= Academy Honorary Award =

Annual award

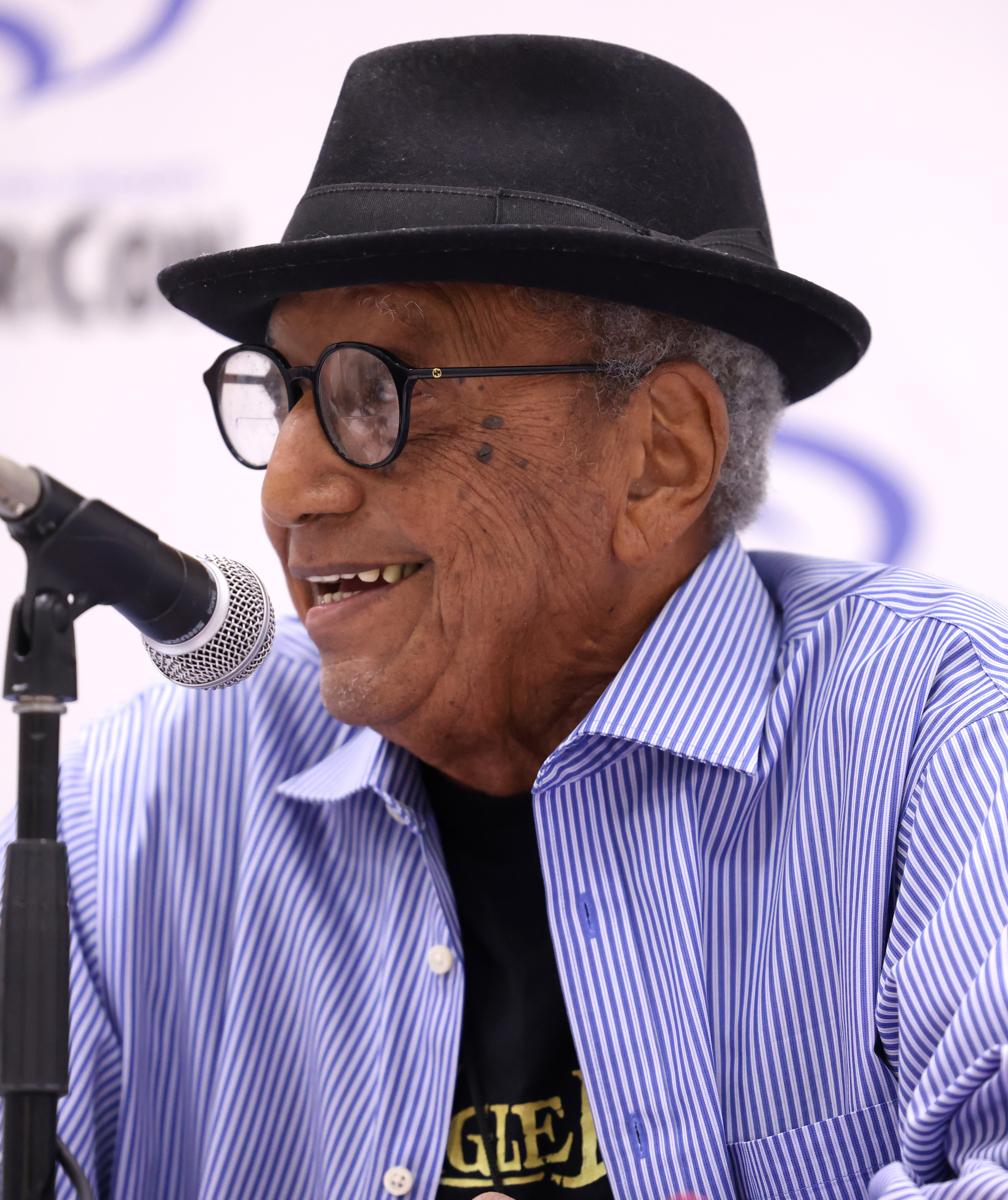
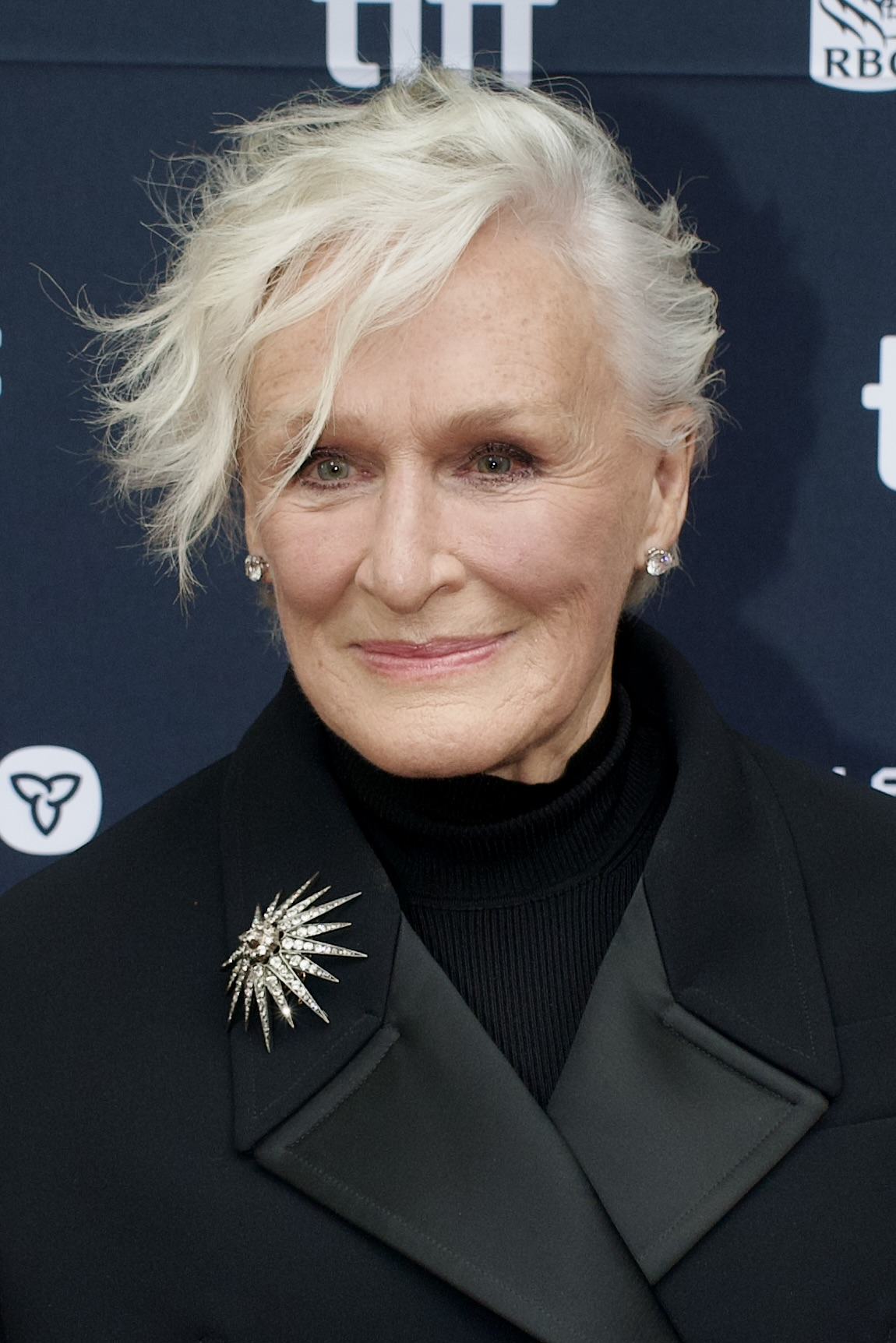
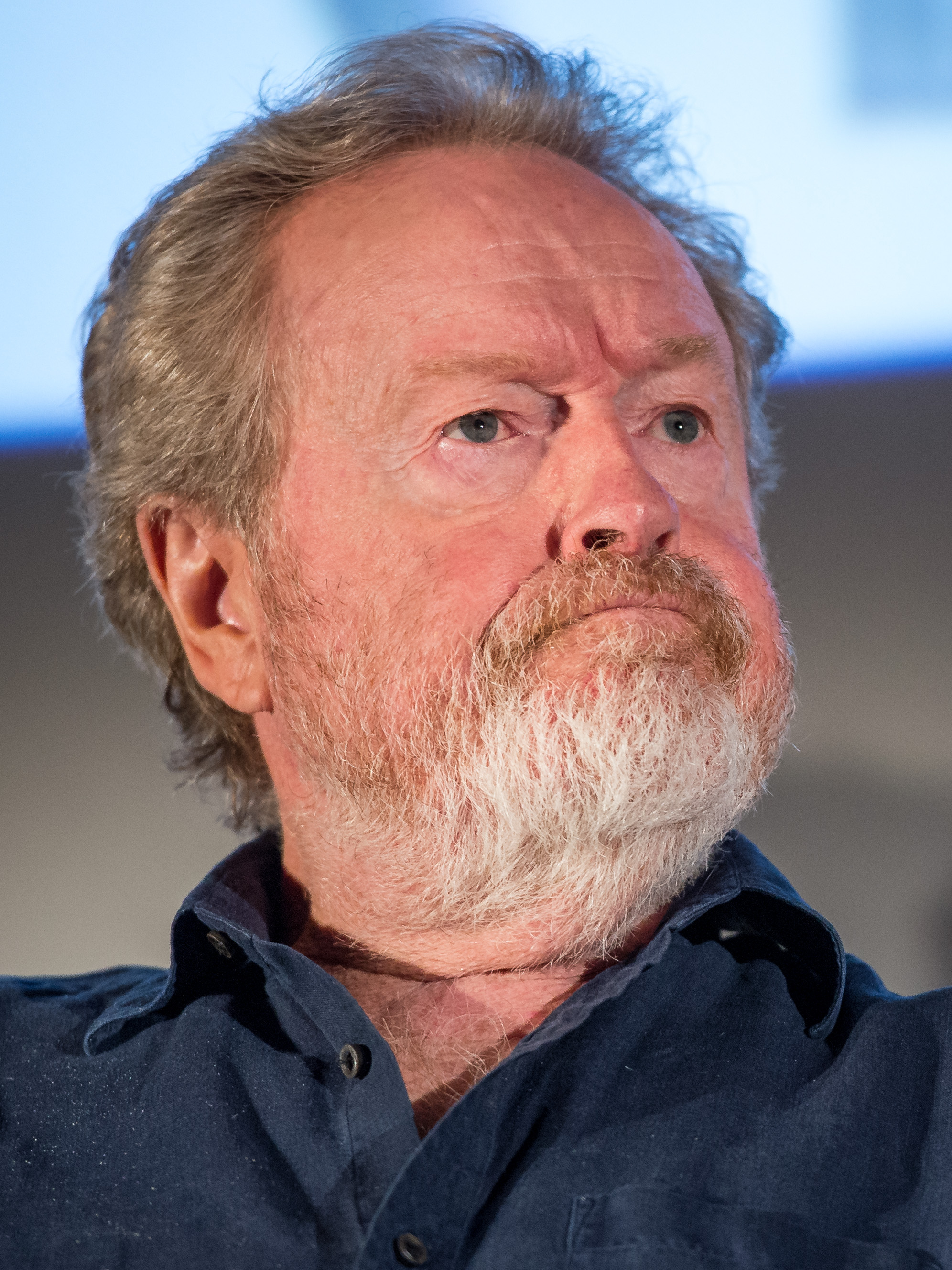
- The 2027 recipients: Floyd Norman, Glenn Close and Ridley Scott
- Awarded for: Extraordinary distinction in lifetime achievement, exceptional contributions to the state of motion picture arts and sciences, or for outstanding service to the Academy.
- Country: United States
- Presented by: Academy of Motion Picture Arts and Sciences (AMPAS)
- First award: 1929
- Most recent winners: Floyd Norman, Glenn Close and Ridley Scott (2027)
- Website: oscars.org

The Academy Honorary Award – instituted in 1950 for the 23rd Academy Awards (previously called the Special Award, which was first presented at the 1st Academy Awards in 1929) – is given annually by the Board of Governors of the Academy of Motion Picture Arts and Sciences (AMPAS). Since 2009, it has been presented at the separate annual Governors Awards rather than at the regular Academy Awards ceremony. The Honorary Award celebrates motion picture achievements that are not covered by existing Academy Awards, although prior winners of competitive Academy Awards are not excluded from receiving the award.

Unless otherwise specified, Honorary Award recipients receive the same gold Oscar statuettes received by winners of the competitive Academy Awards. Unlike the Special Achievement Award instituted in 1972, those on whom the Academy confers its Honorary Award do not have to meet "the Academy's eligibility year and deadline requirements".

Like the Special Achievement Award, the Special Award and Honorary Award have been used to reward significant achievements of the year that did not fit in existing categories, subsequently leading the Academy to establish several new categories, and to honor exceptional career achievements, contributions to the motion picture industry, and service to the Academy.

== Recipients ==
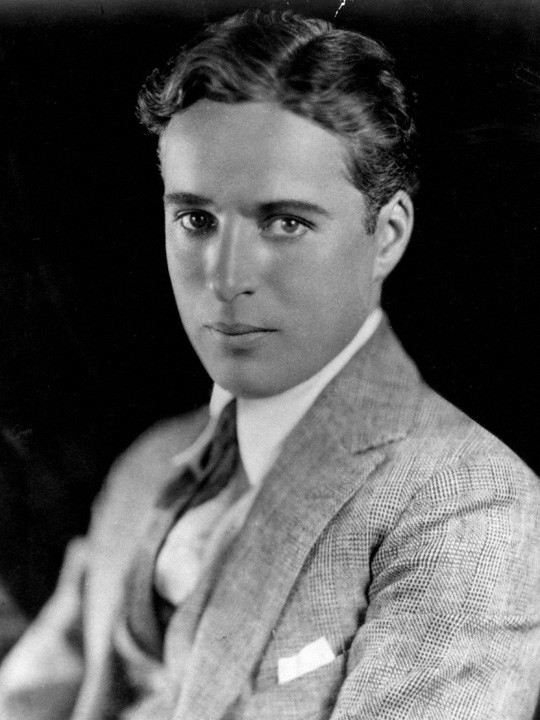
Charlie Chaplin won this award twice in 1927/28 and 1971.

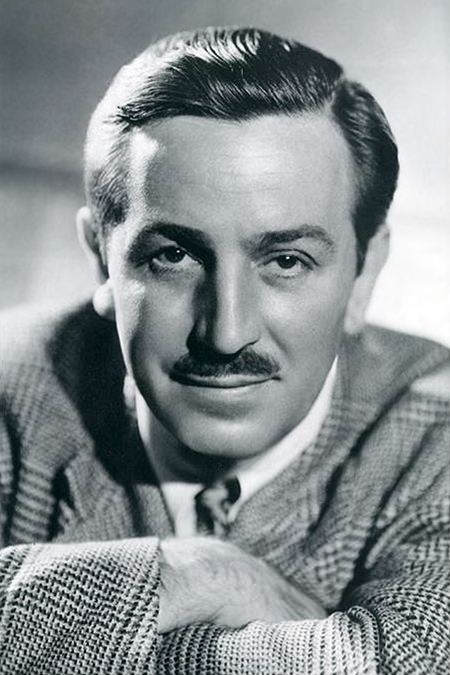
Walt Disney holds the record for most Oscar nominations (59) and wins (22). He received four Honorary Awards in addition to those wins.

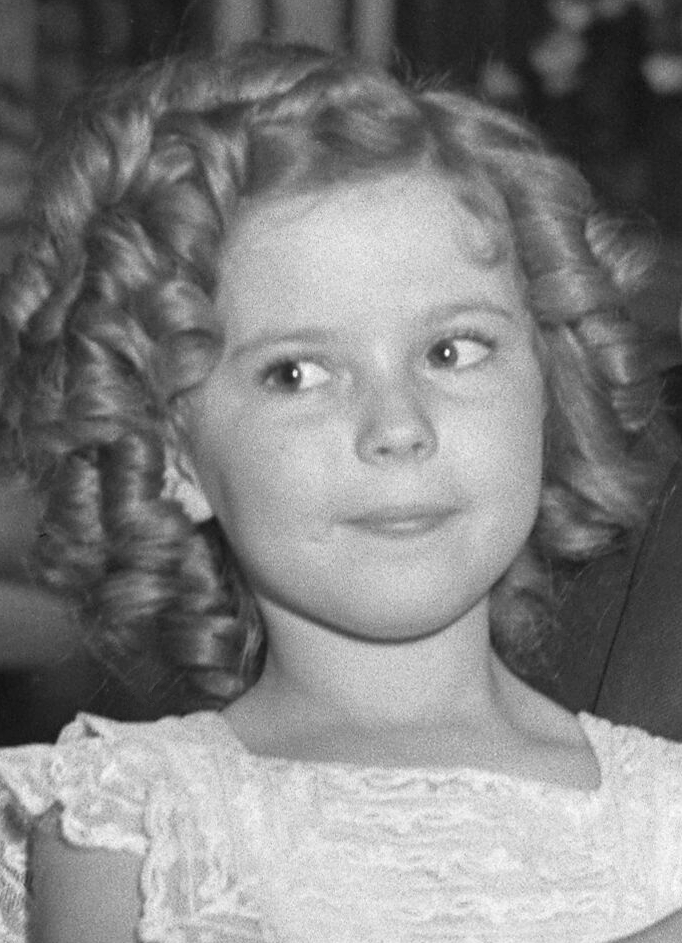
Shirley Temple received the first Juvenile Award, in the form of a miniature statuette.

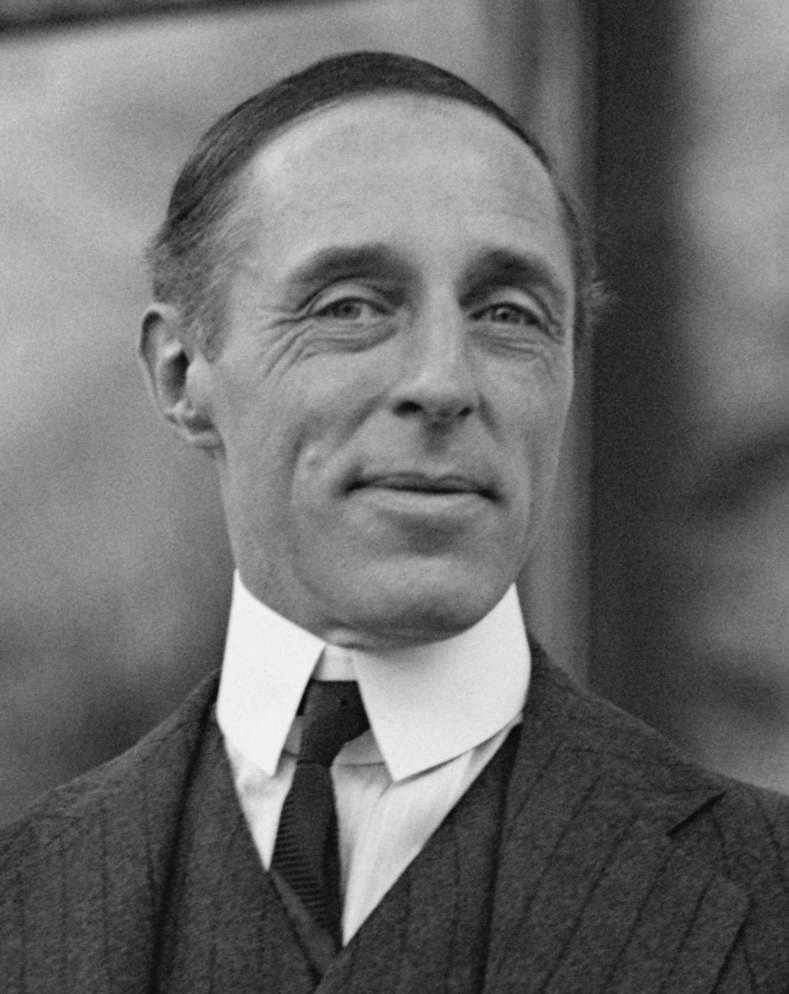
D. W. Griffith won in 1935

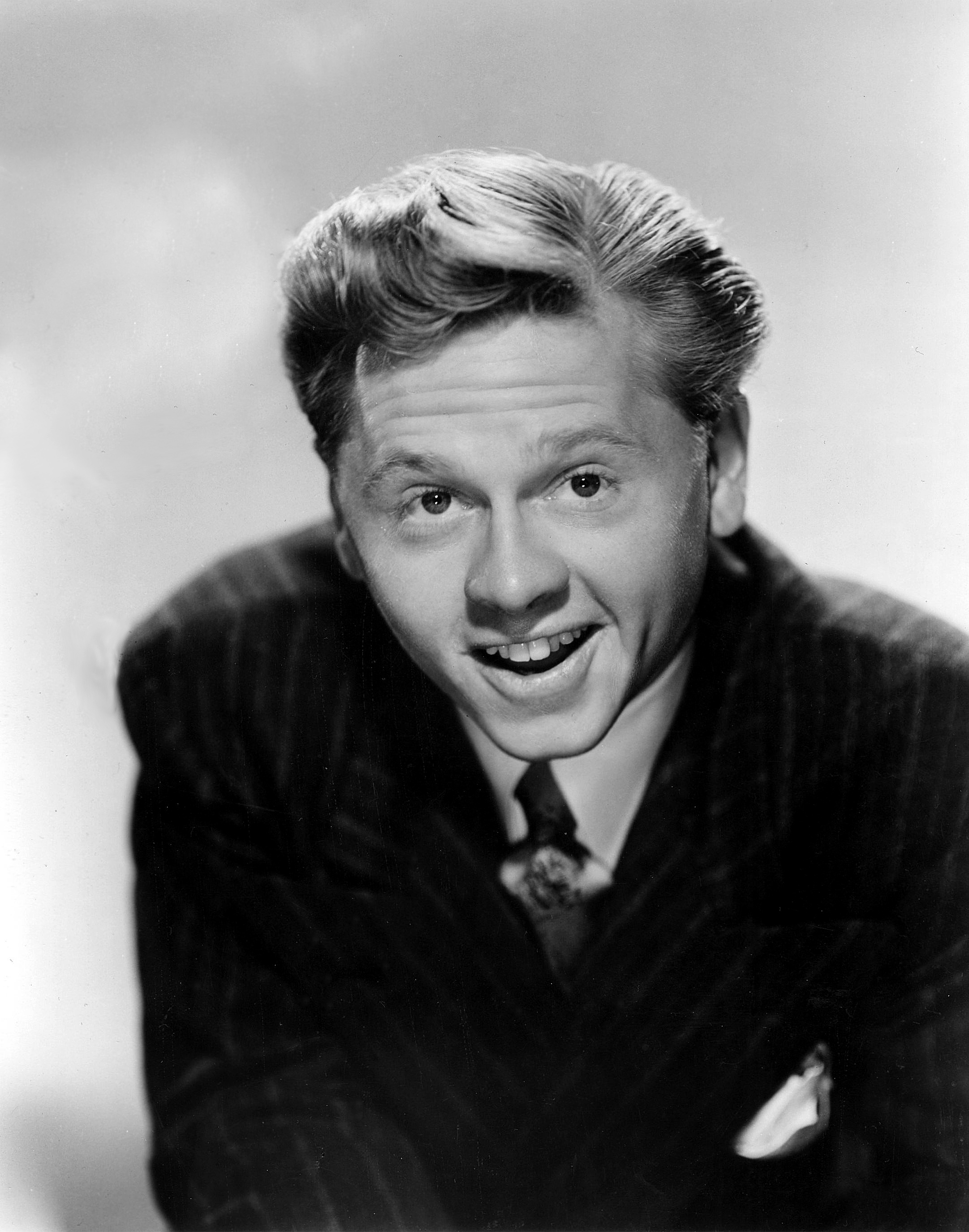
Mickey Rooney received two: a Juvenile Award in 1938, and the Honorary Award in 1982.

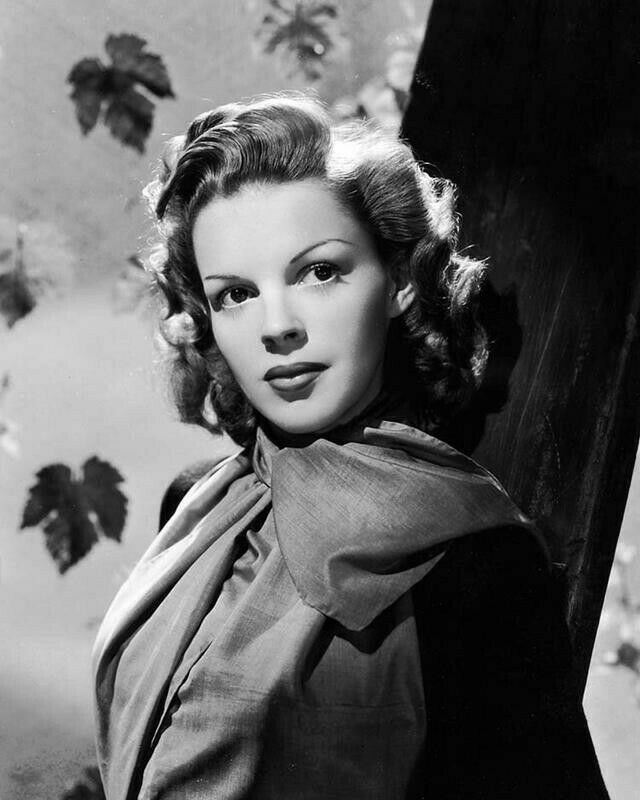
Judy Garland received her Juvenile Award for the 1939 films The Wizard of Oz and Babes in Arms.

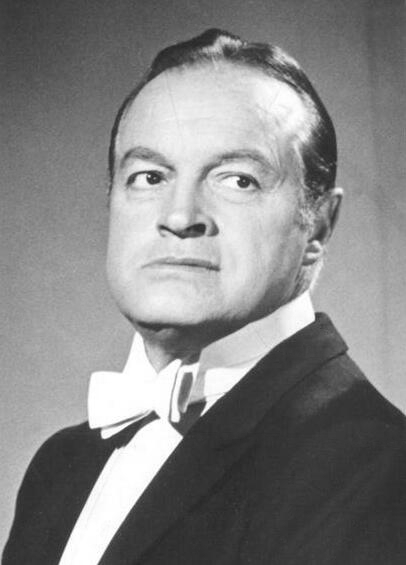
Bob Hope was the recipient of five Honorary Awards (one being the Jean Hersholt Humanitarian Award), between being an actor, Oscars host, etc.

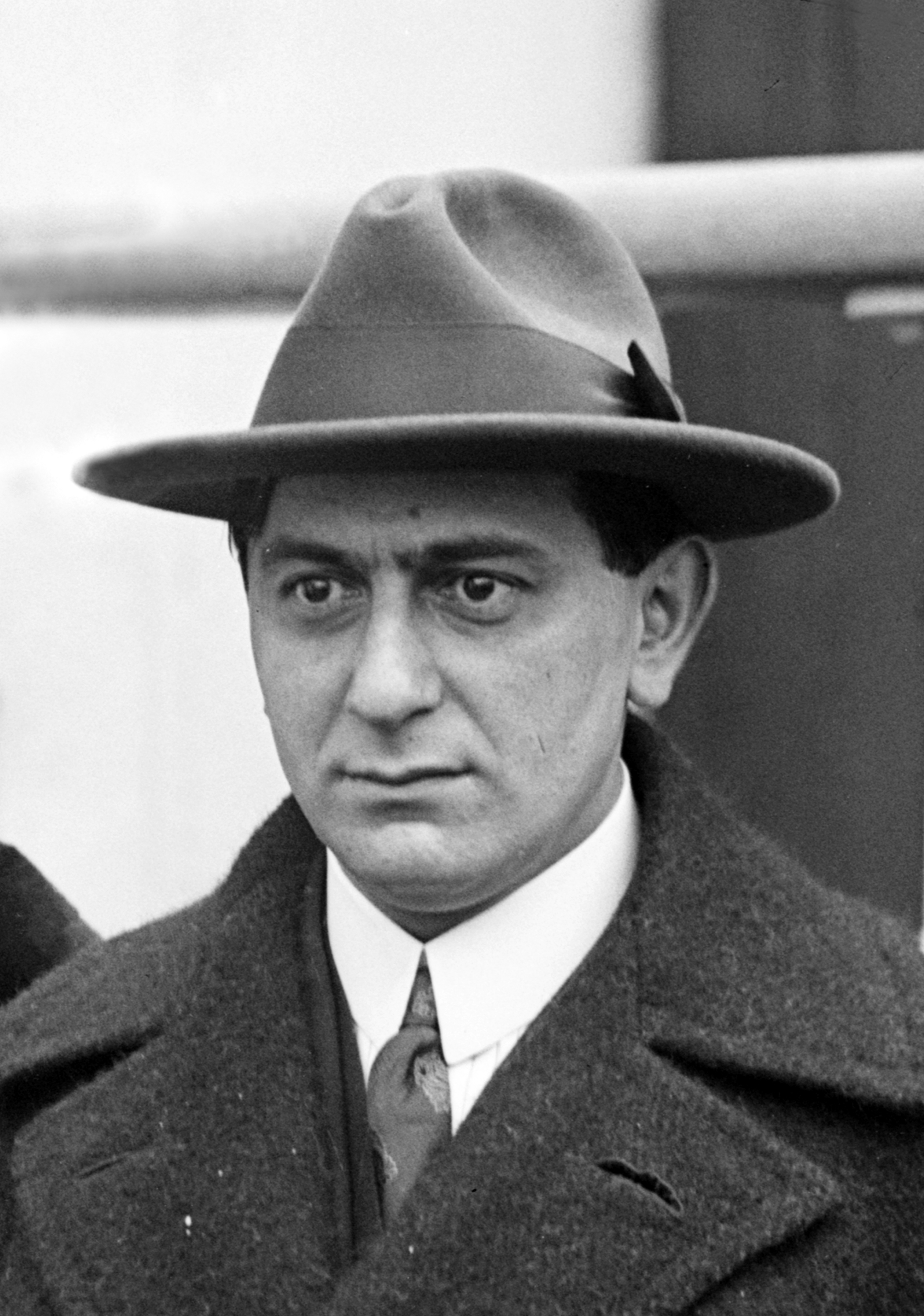
Ernst Lubitsch, a 1946 recipient

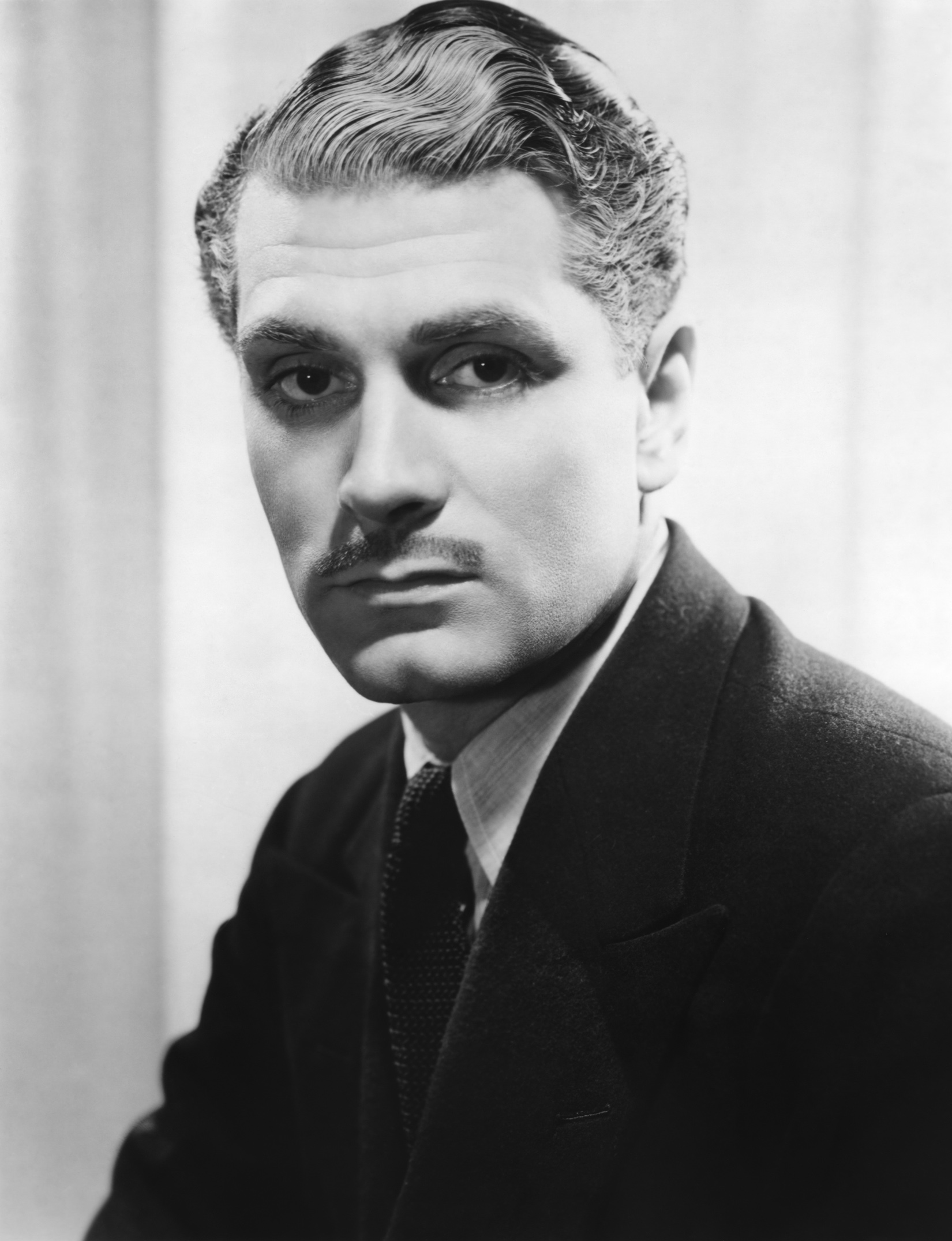
Laurence Olivier, 1946, 1979 recipient

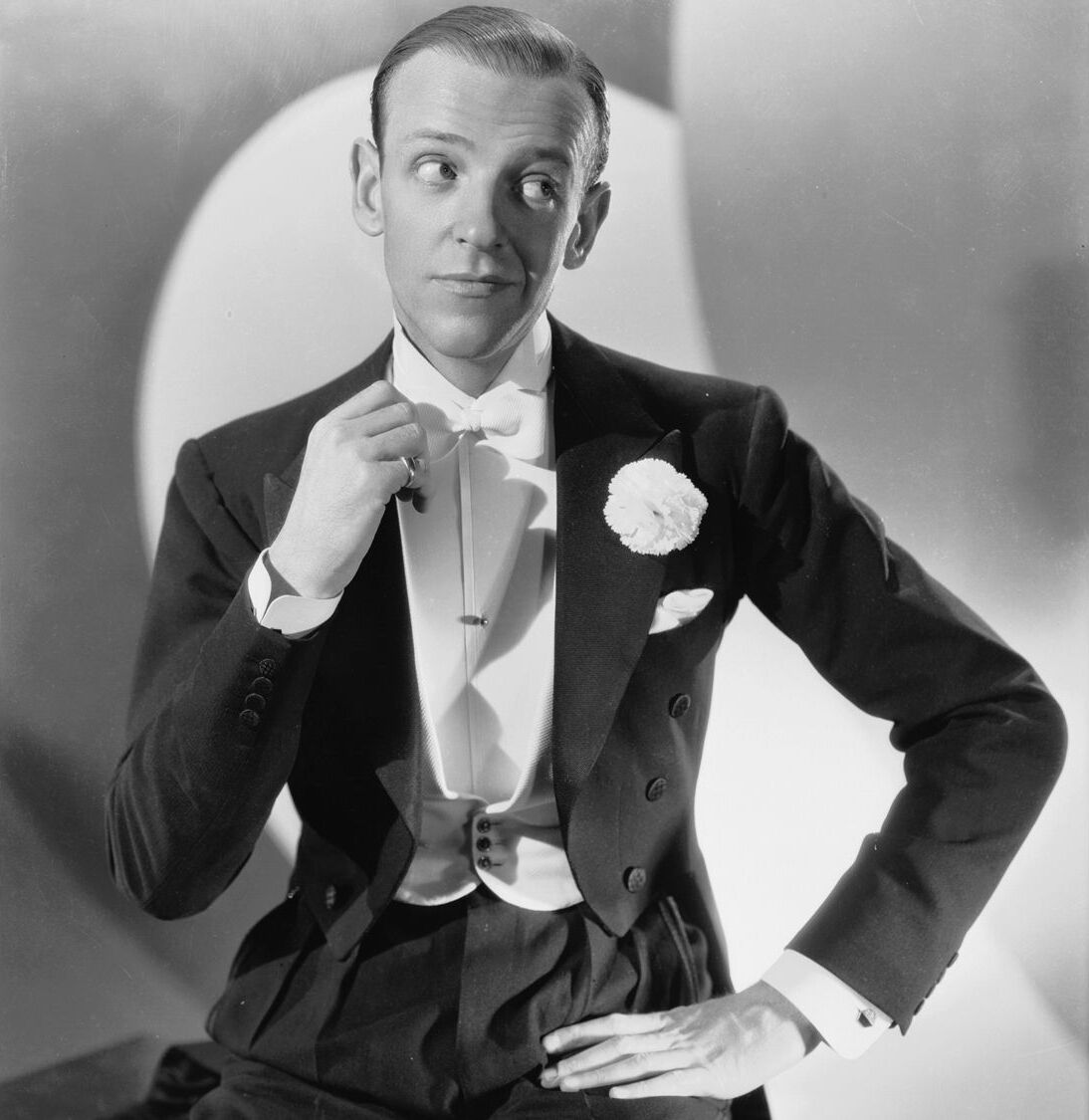
Fred Astaire, 1949 and 1978 recipient

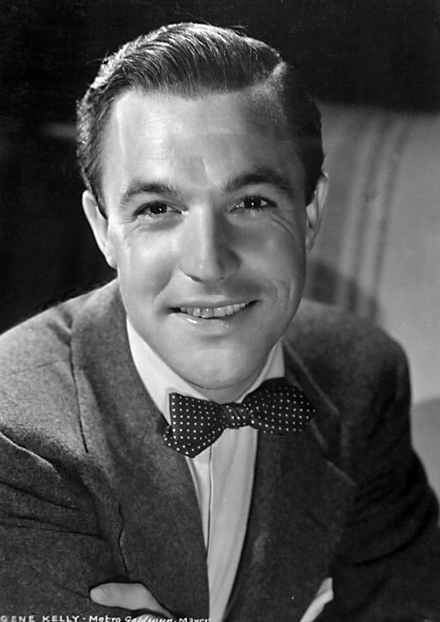
Gene Kelly, 1951, recipient

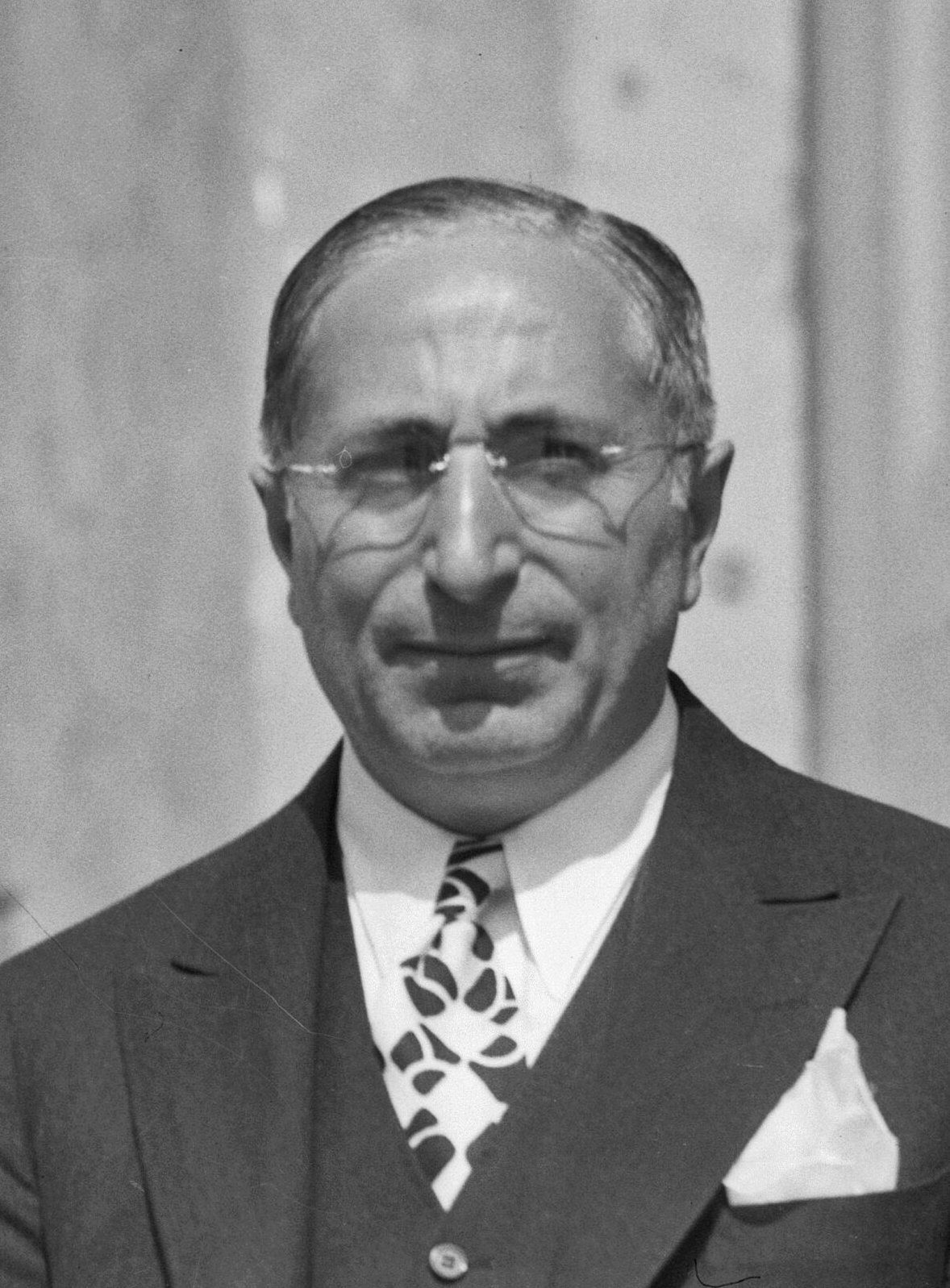
Louis B. Mayer, 1950 recipient

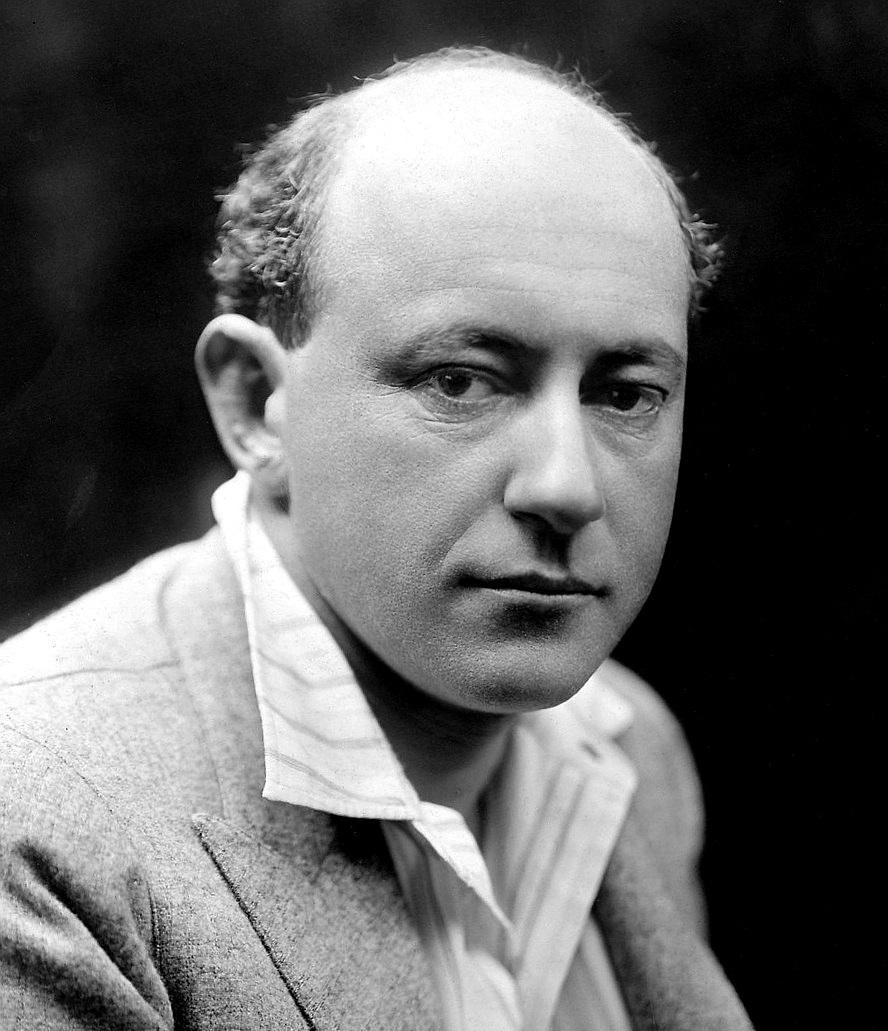
Cecil B. DeMille was given two Honorary Awards in his career (one being the Irving G. Thalberg Memorial Award).

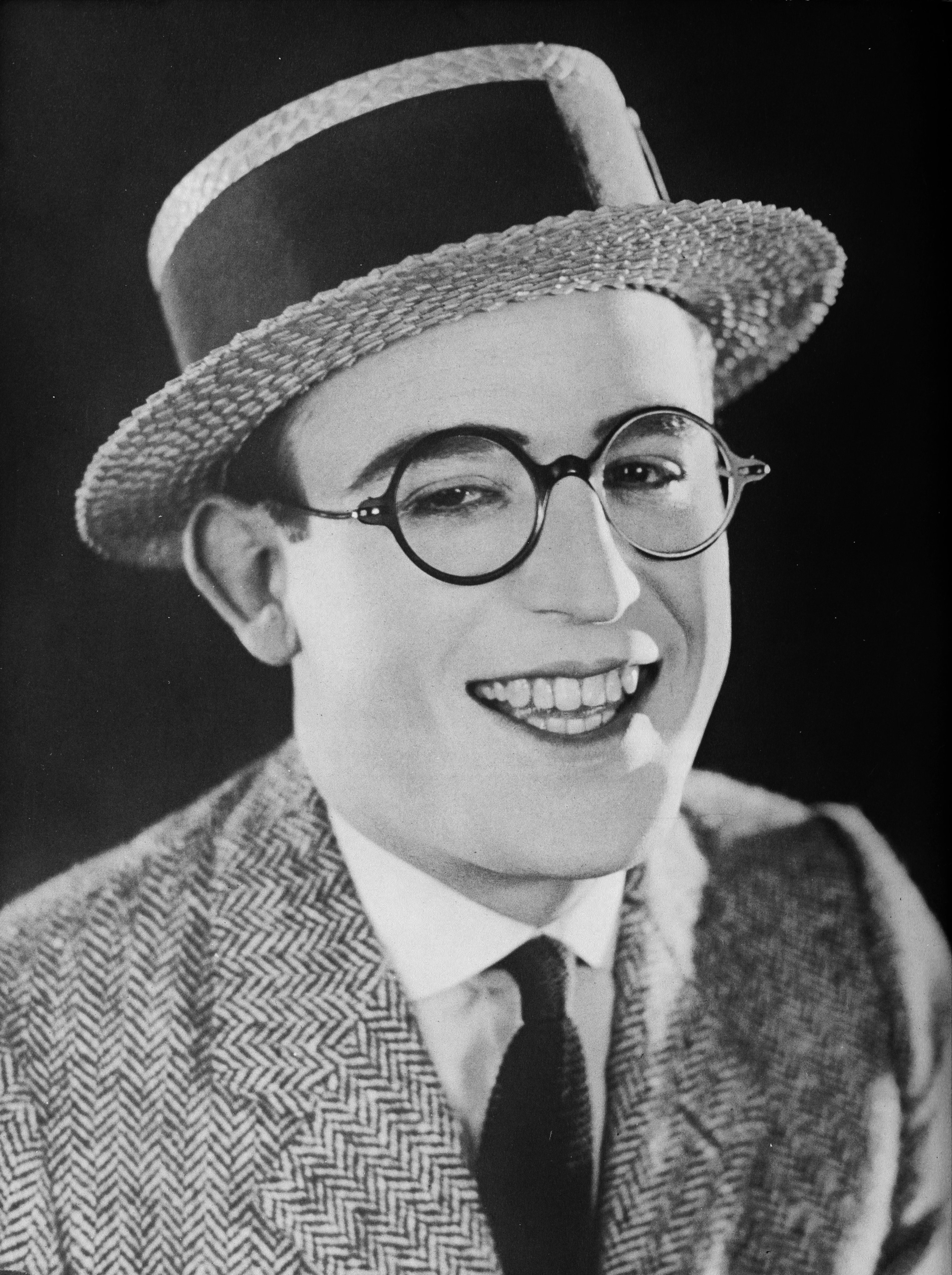
Harold Lloyd, 1952 recipient

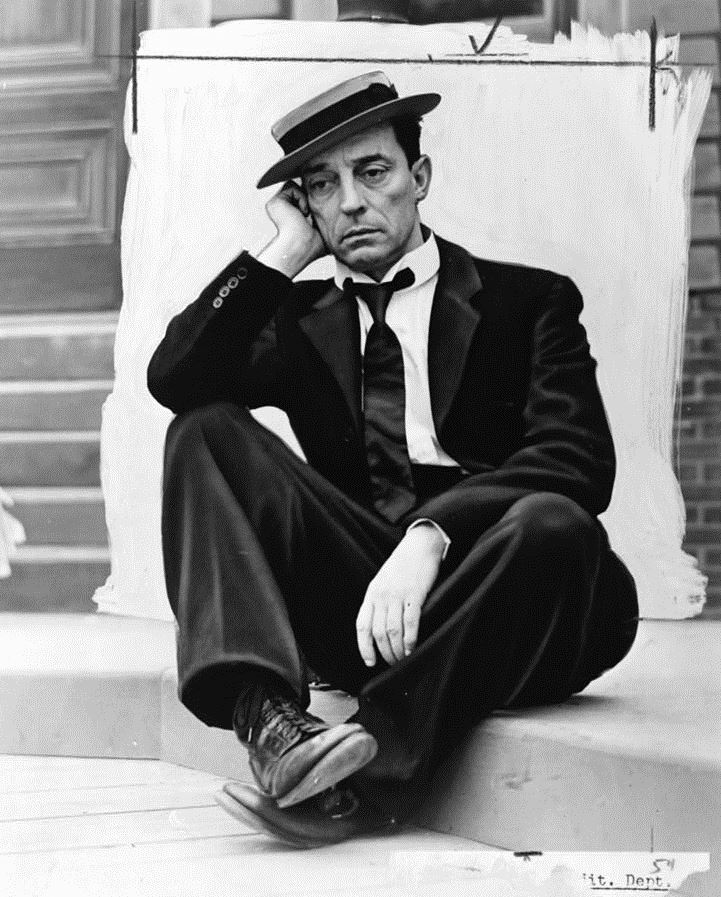
Buster Keaton, 1959 recipient

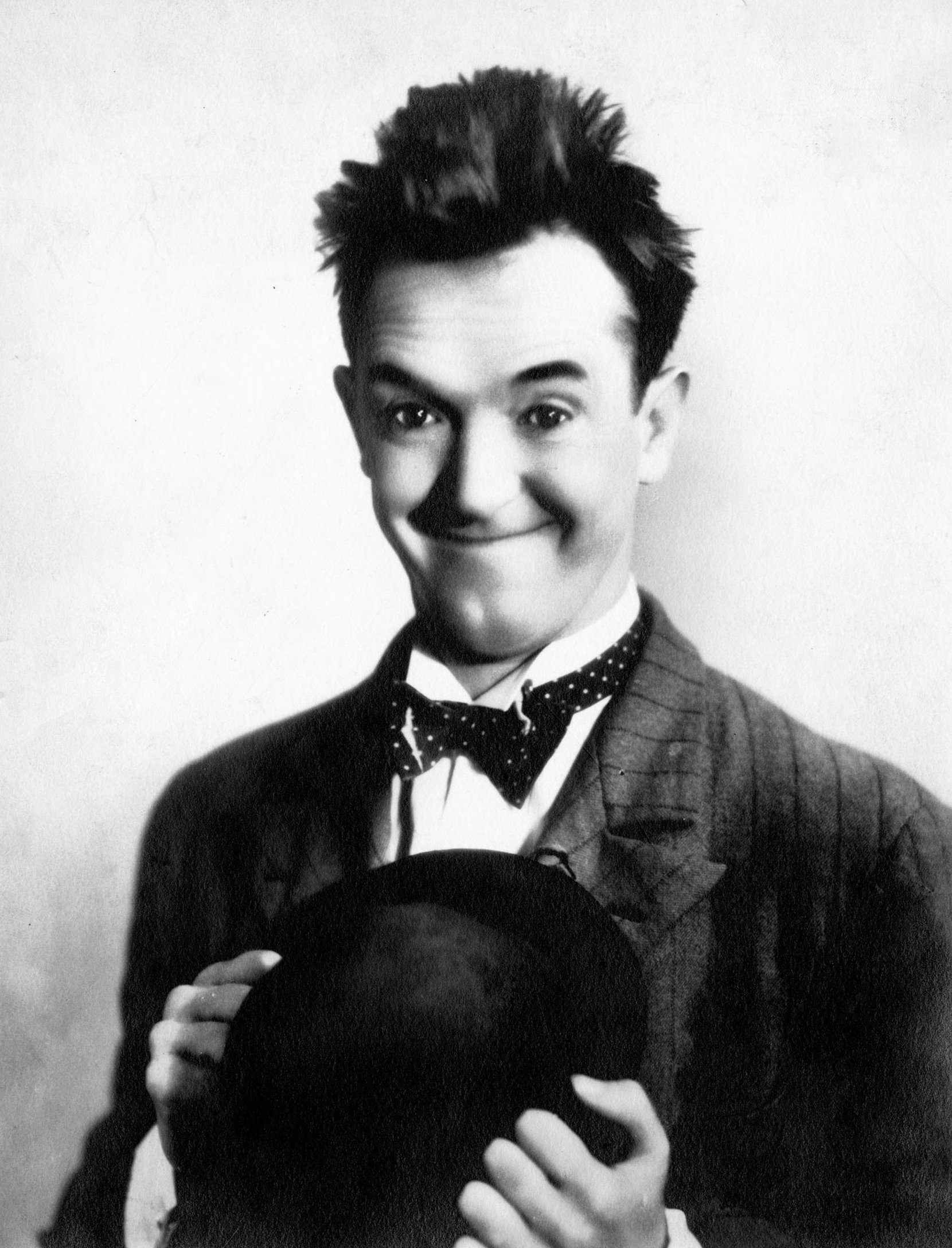
Stan Laurel, 1960 recipient

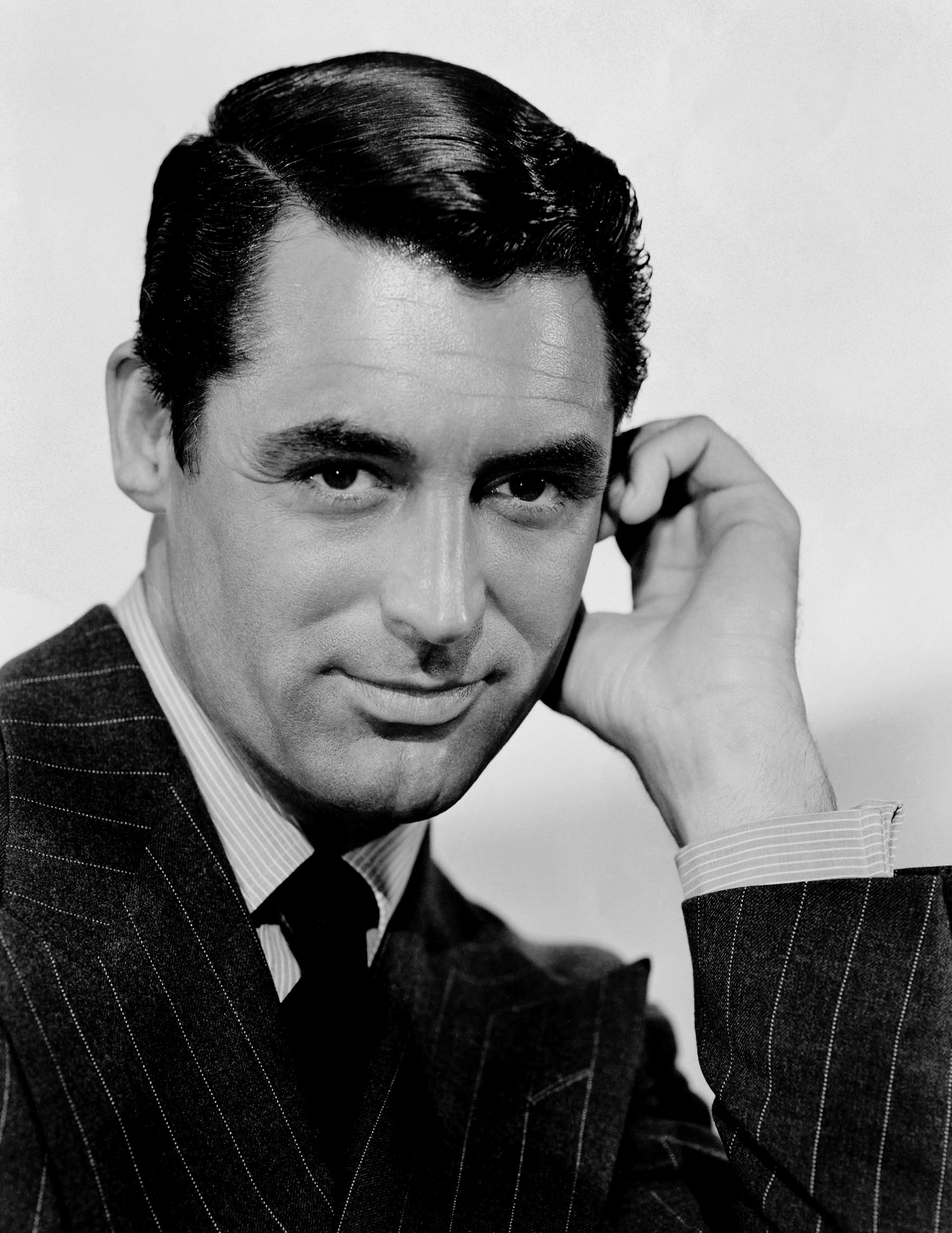
Cary Grant, 1969 recipient

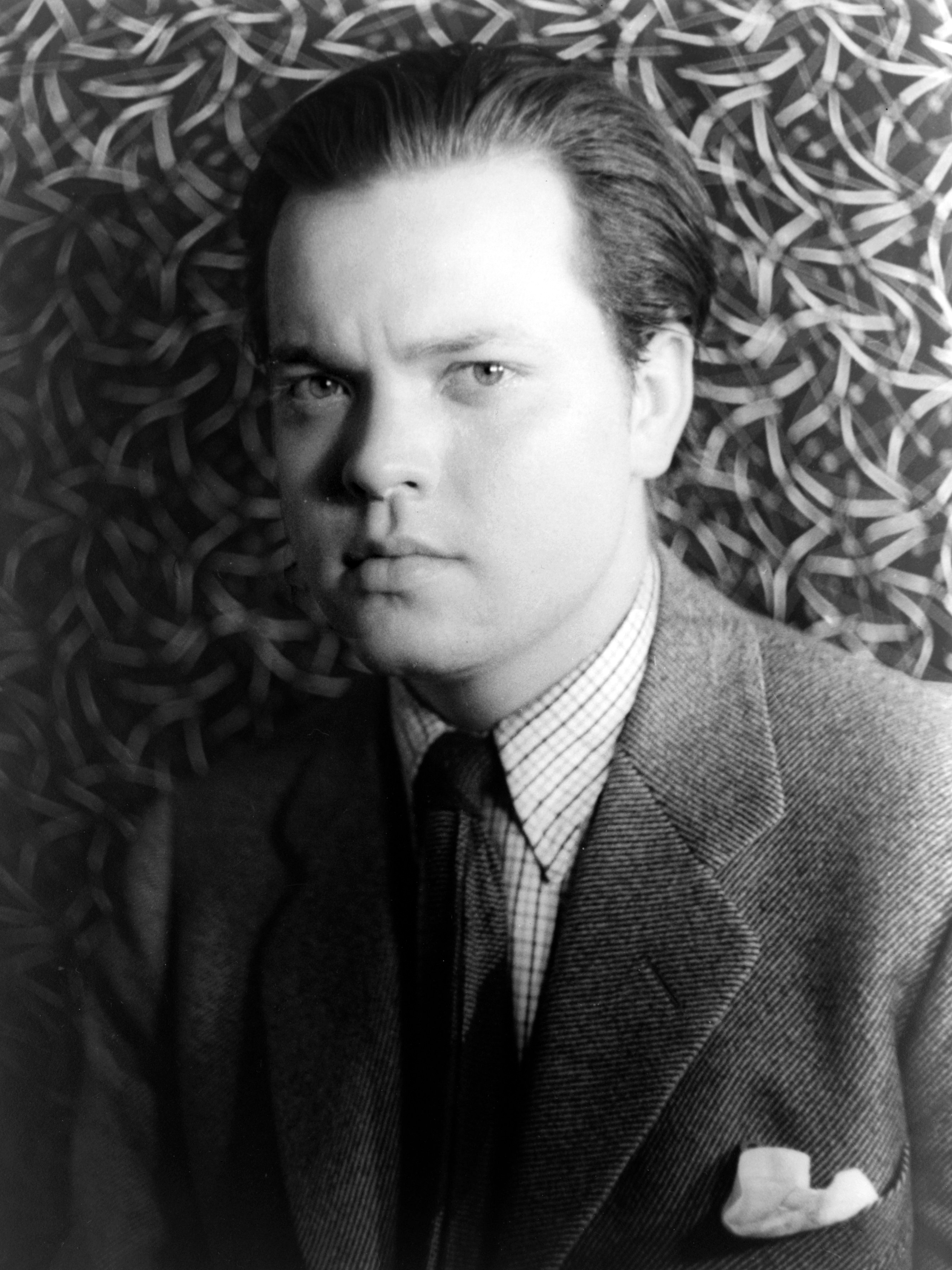
Orson Welles, 1970 recipient

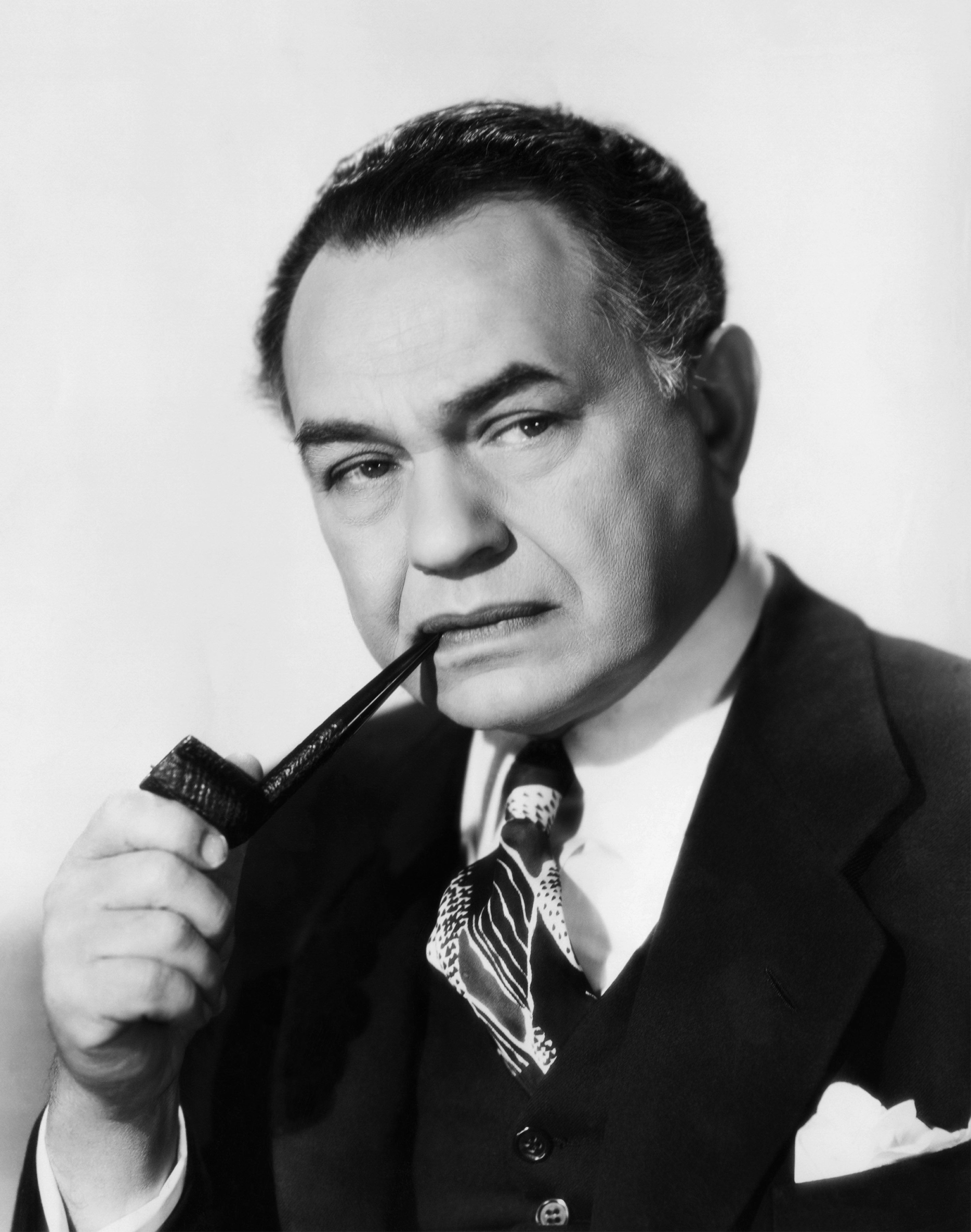
Edward G. Robinson won posthumously, 1972

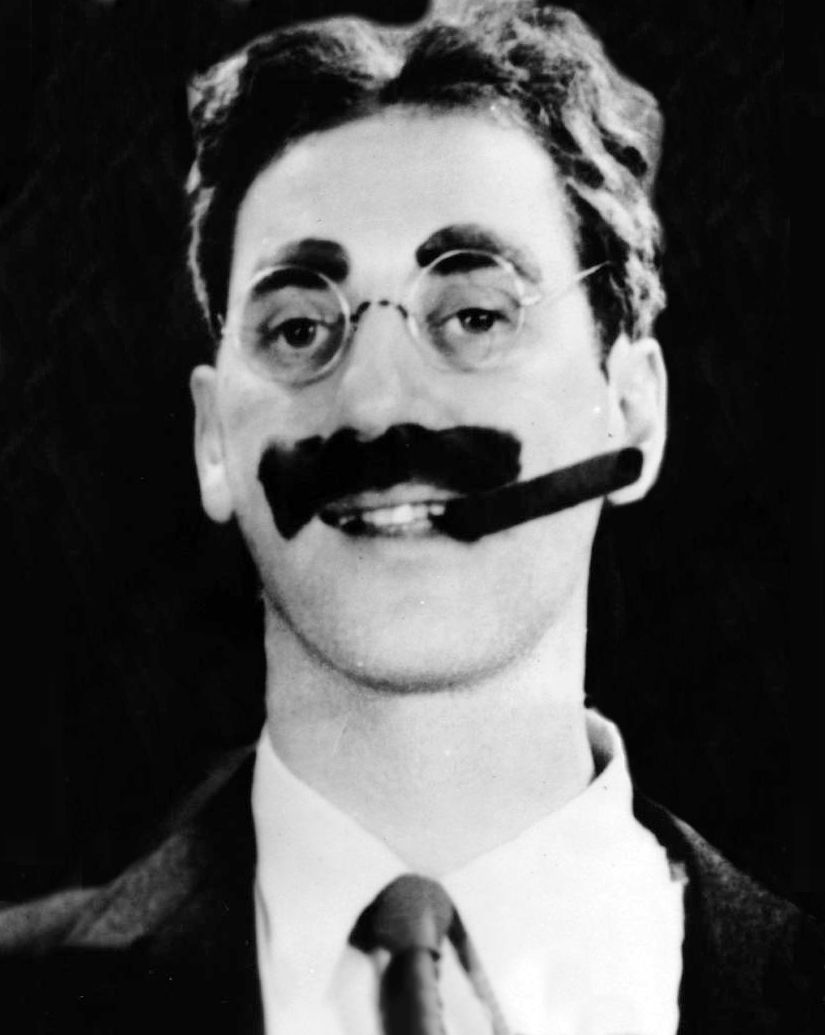
Groucho Marx, 1973 recipient

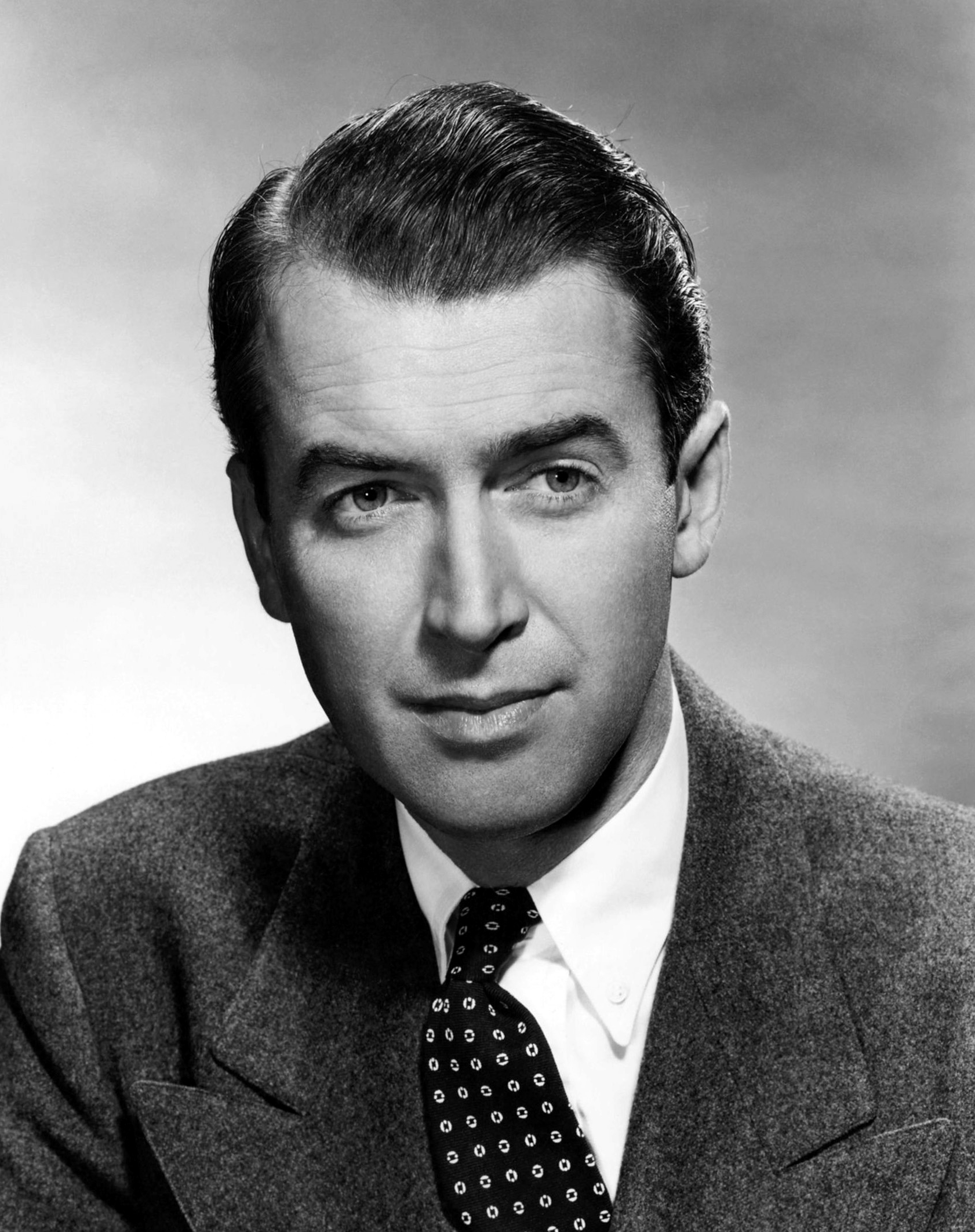
James Stewart, 1984 recipient

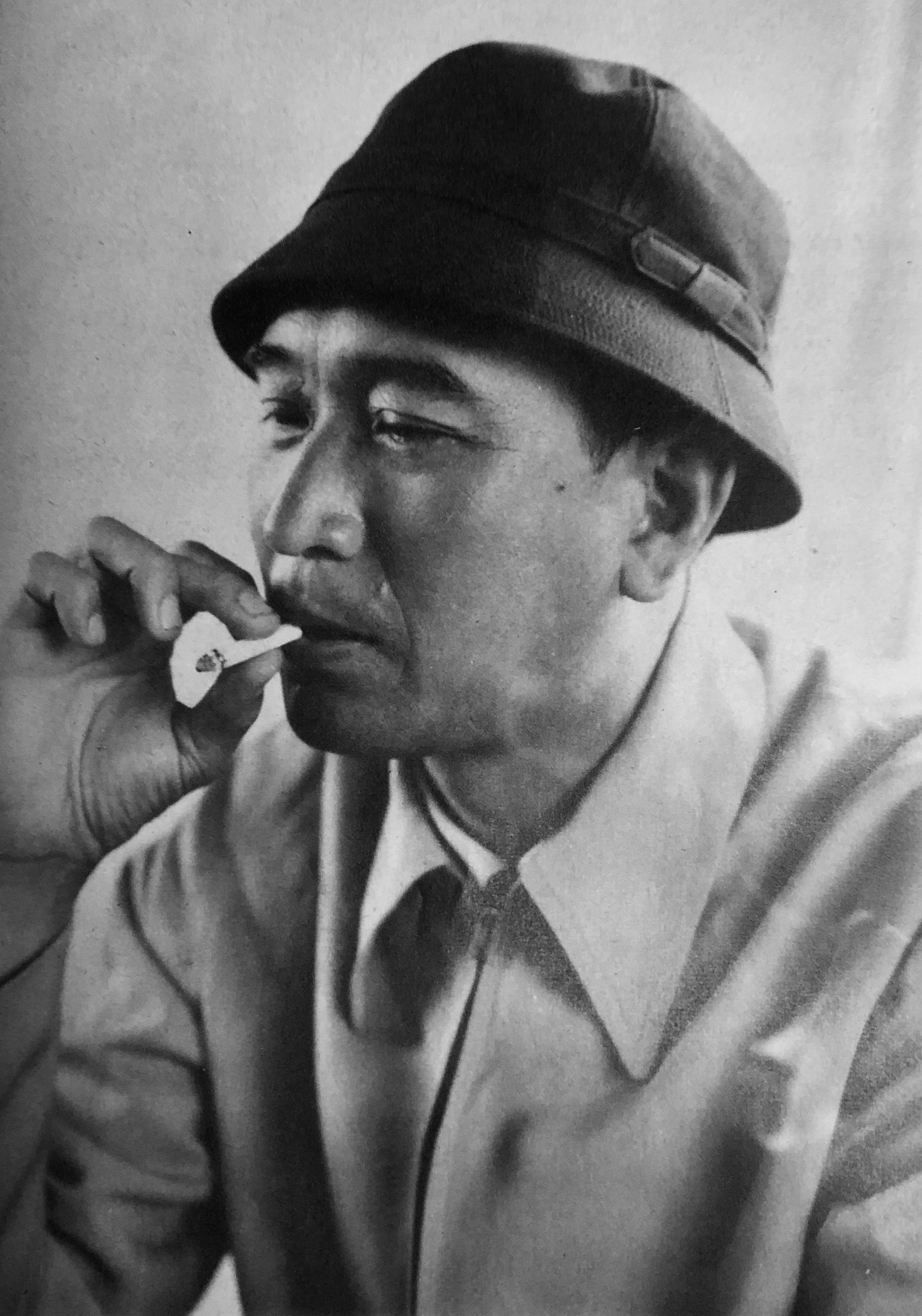
Akira Kurosawa, 1989 recipient

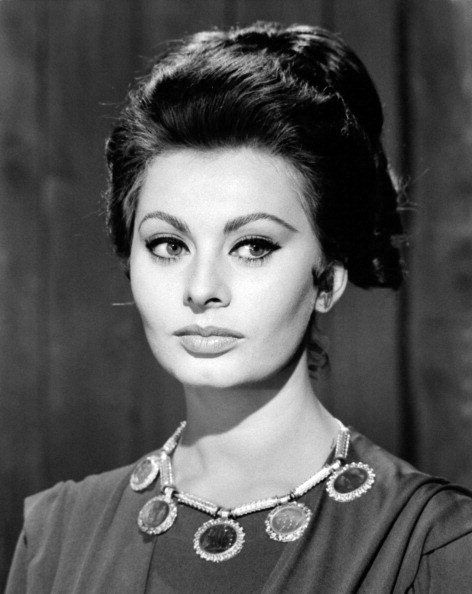
Sophia Loren, 1990 recipient

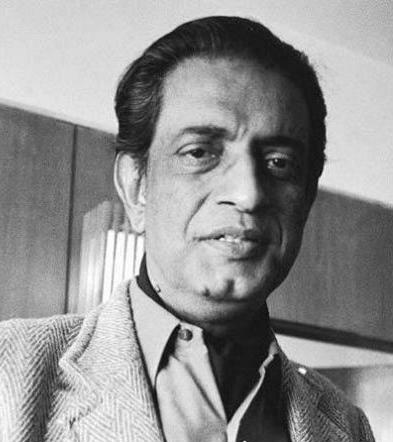
Satyajit Ray, 1991 recipient

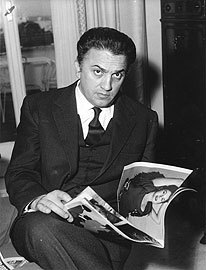
Federico Fellini, 1992 recipient

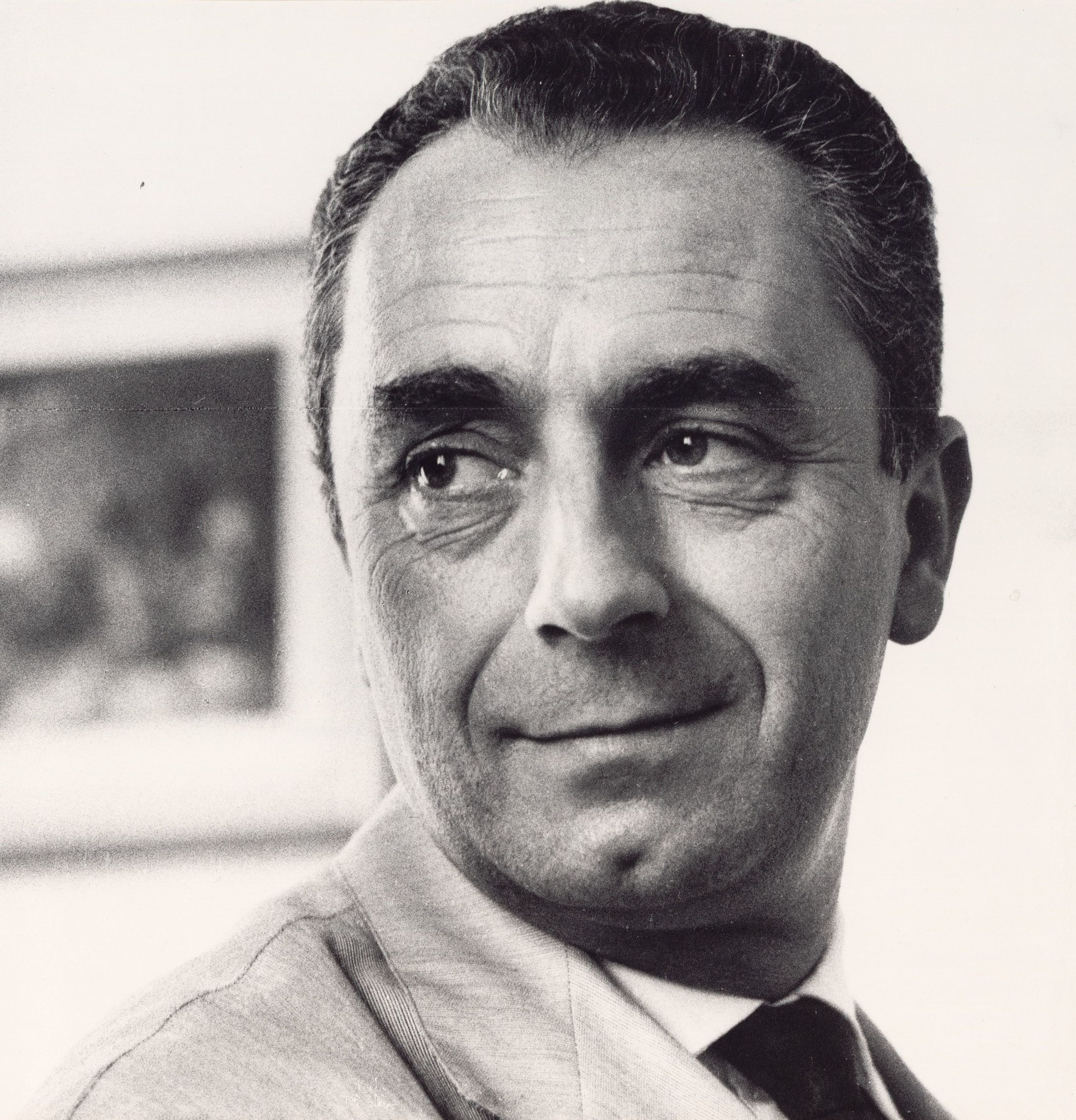
Michelangelo Antonioni, 1994 recipient

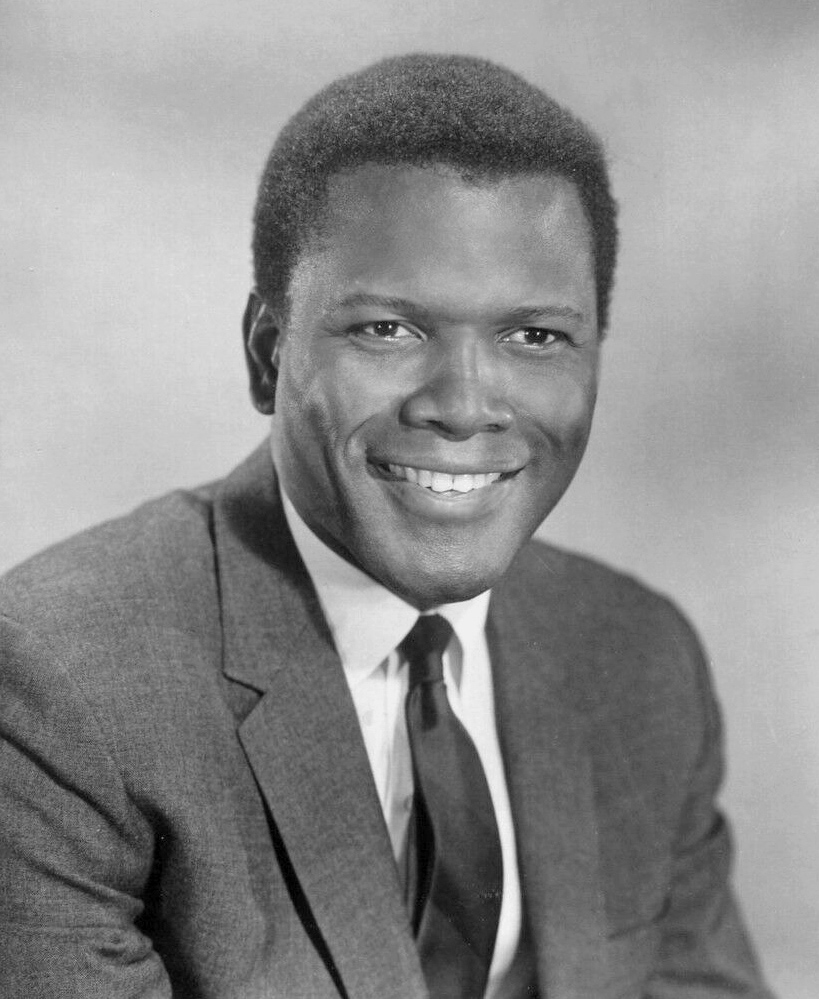
Sidney Poitier, 2002 recipient

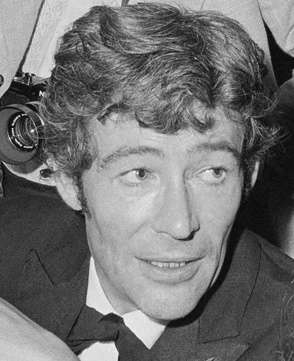
Peter O'Toole, 2002 recipient

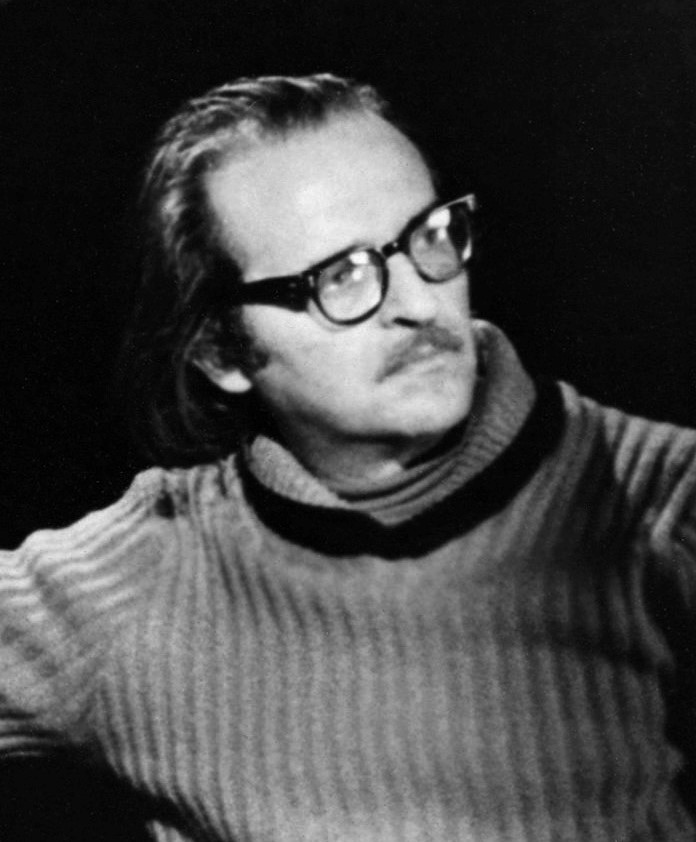
Sidney Lumet, 2004 recipient

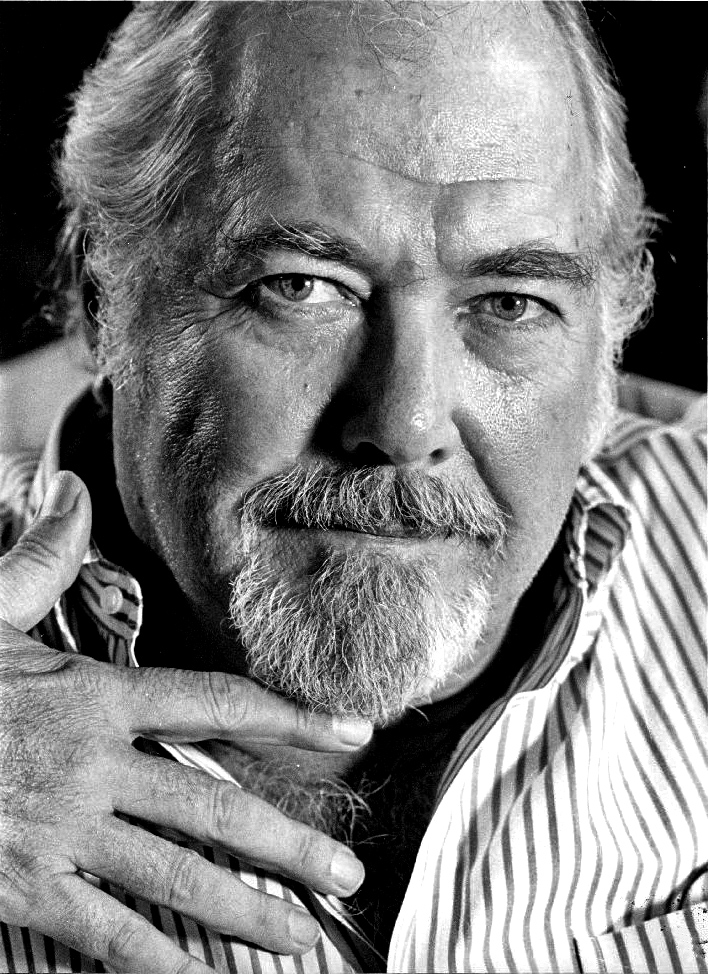
Robert Altman, 2005 recipient

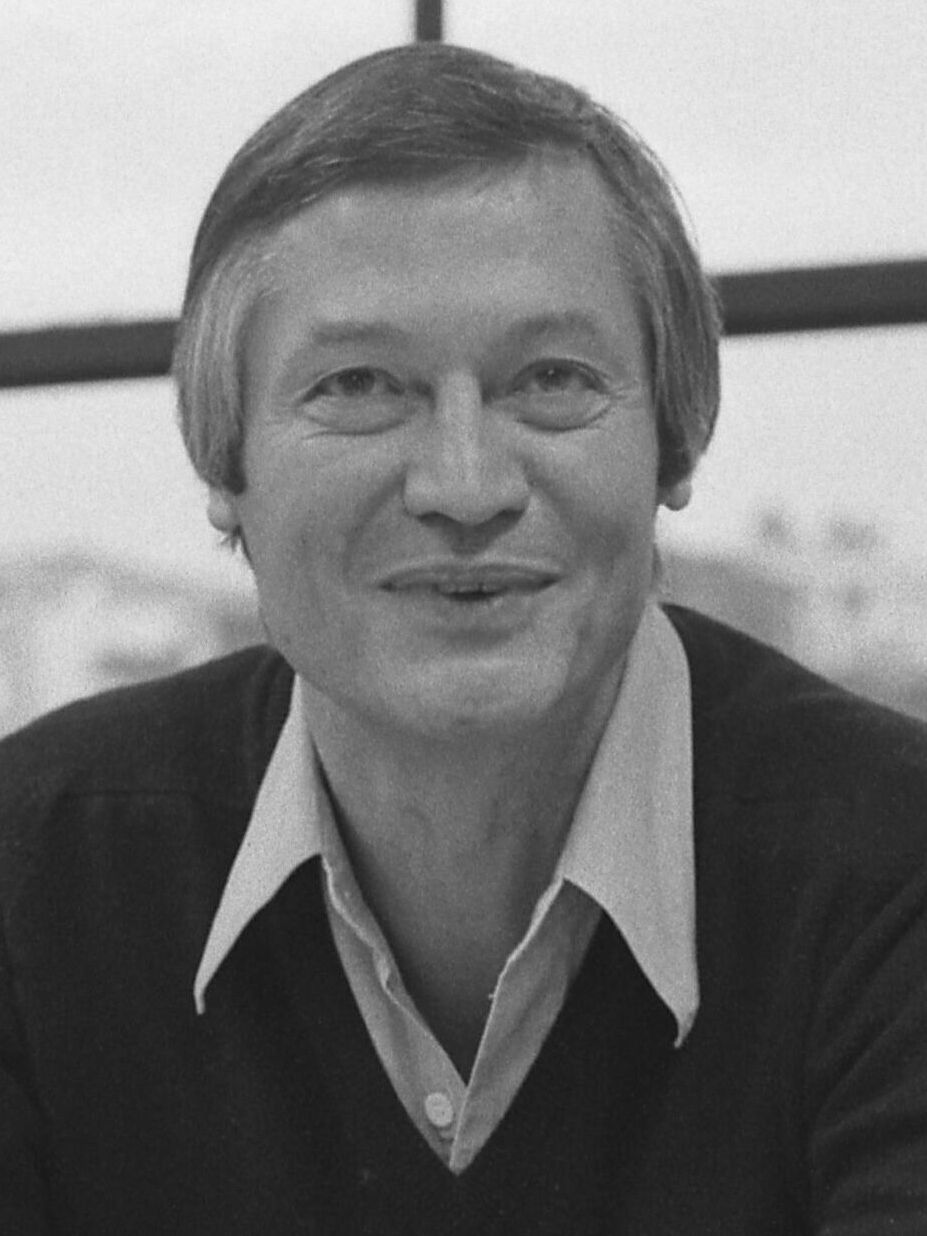
Roger Corman, 2009 recipient

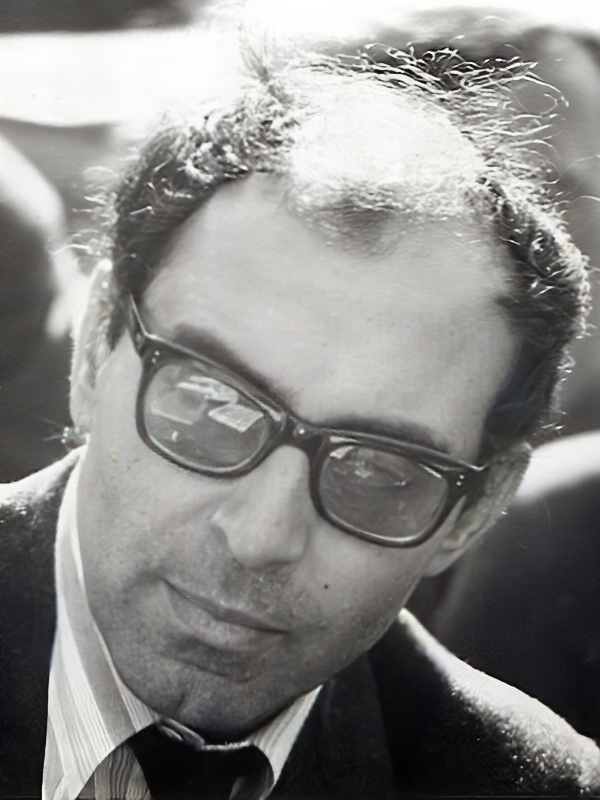
Jean-Luc Godard, 2010 recipient.

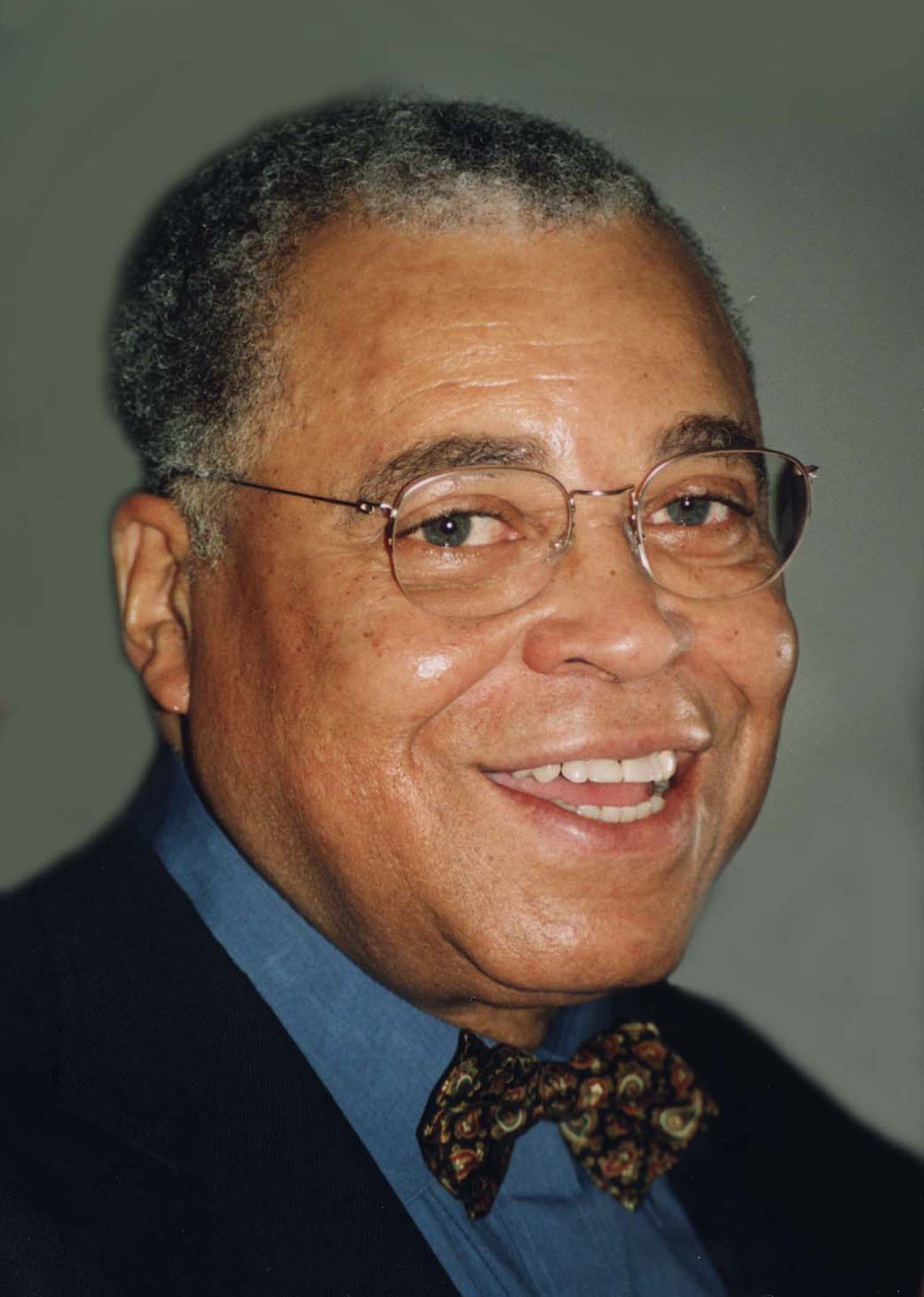
James Earl Jones, 2011 recipient

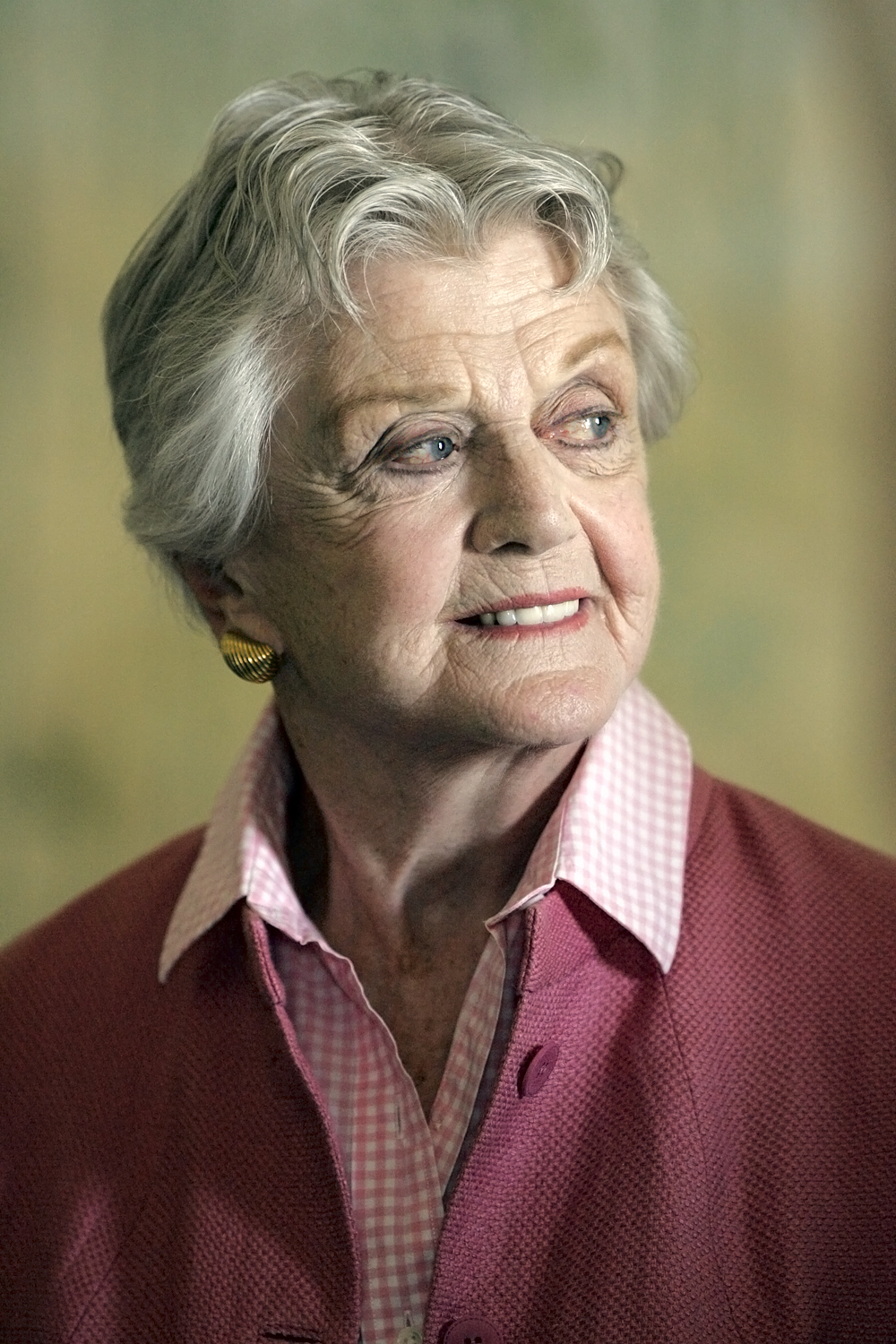
Angela Lansbury, 2013 recipient

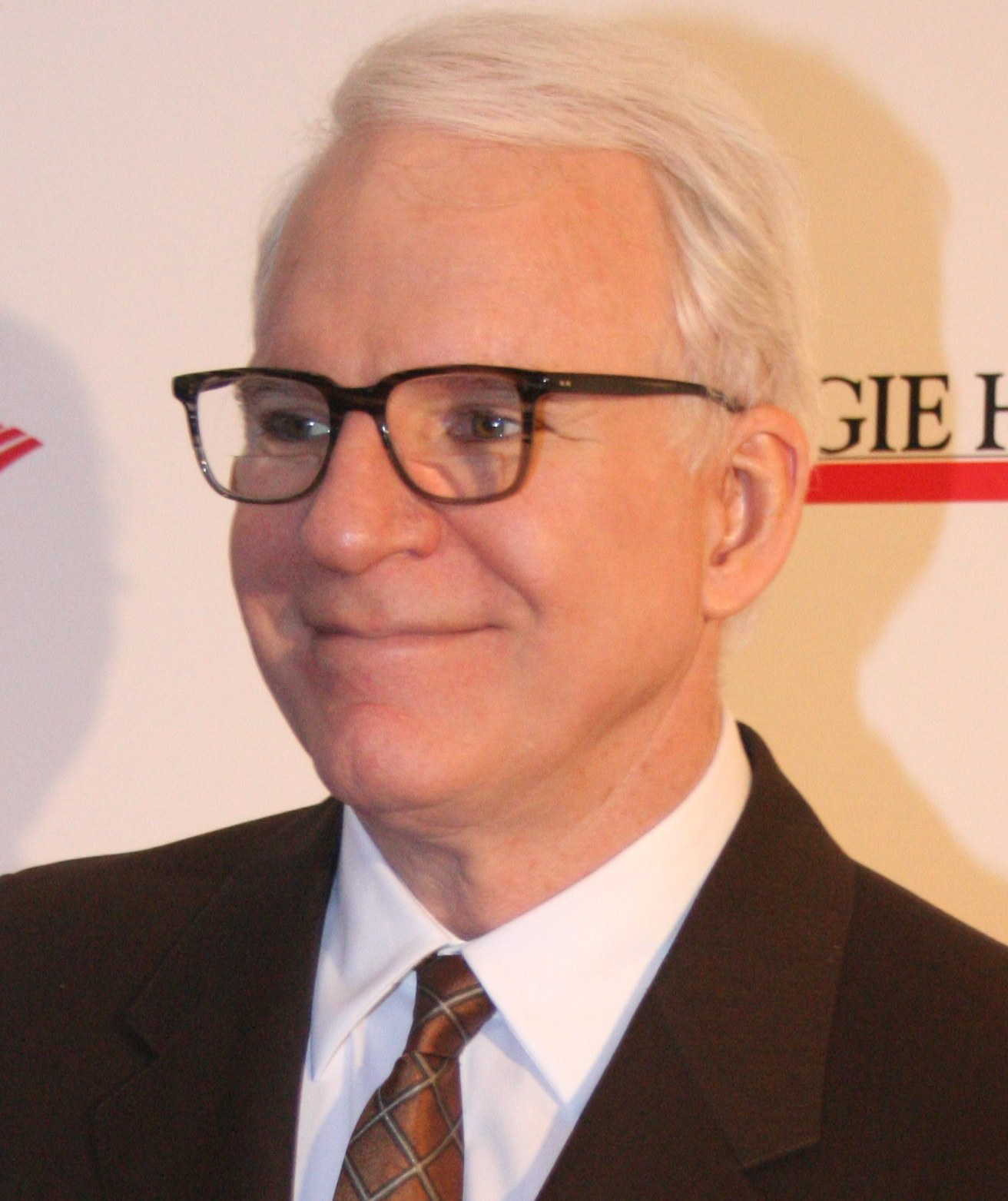
Steve Martin, 2013 recipient

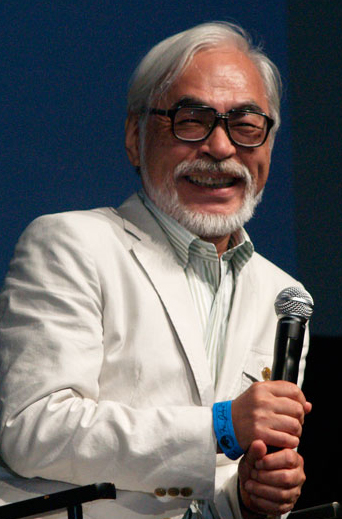
Hayao Miyazaki, 2014 recipient

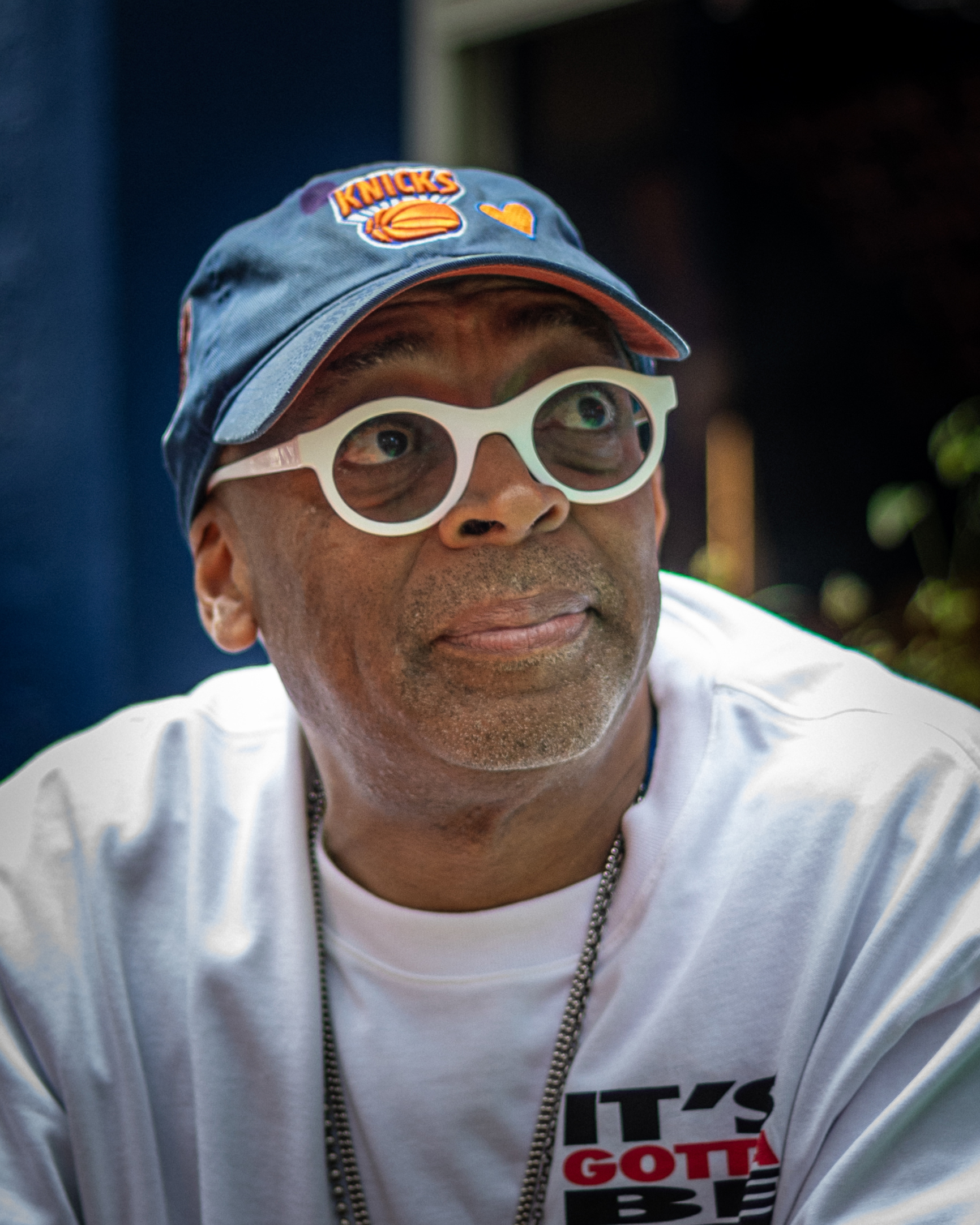
Spike Lee, 2015 recipient

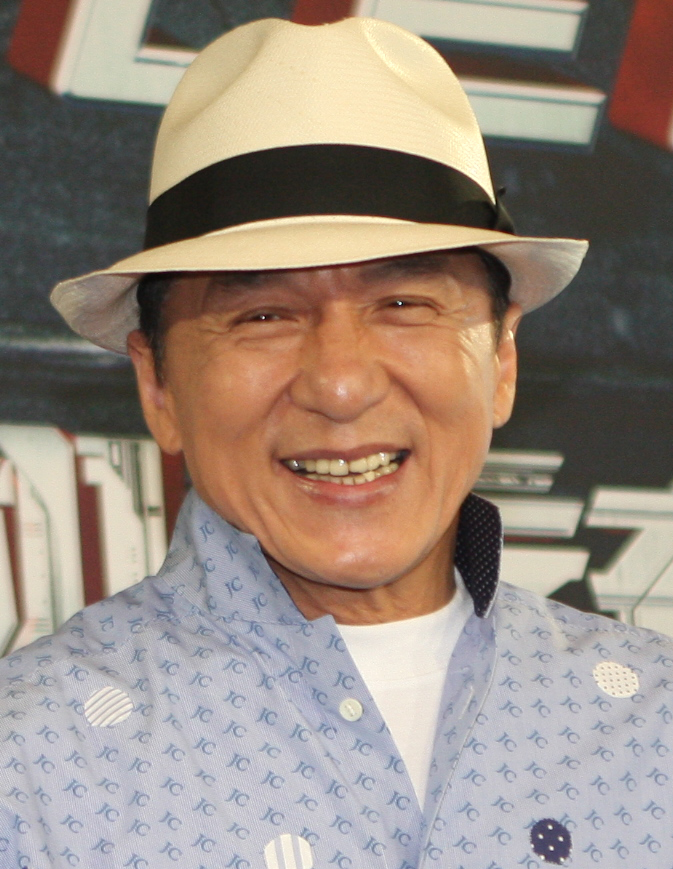
Jackie Chan, 2016 recipient

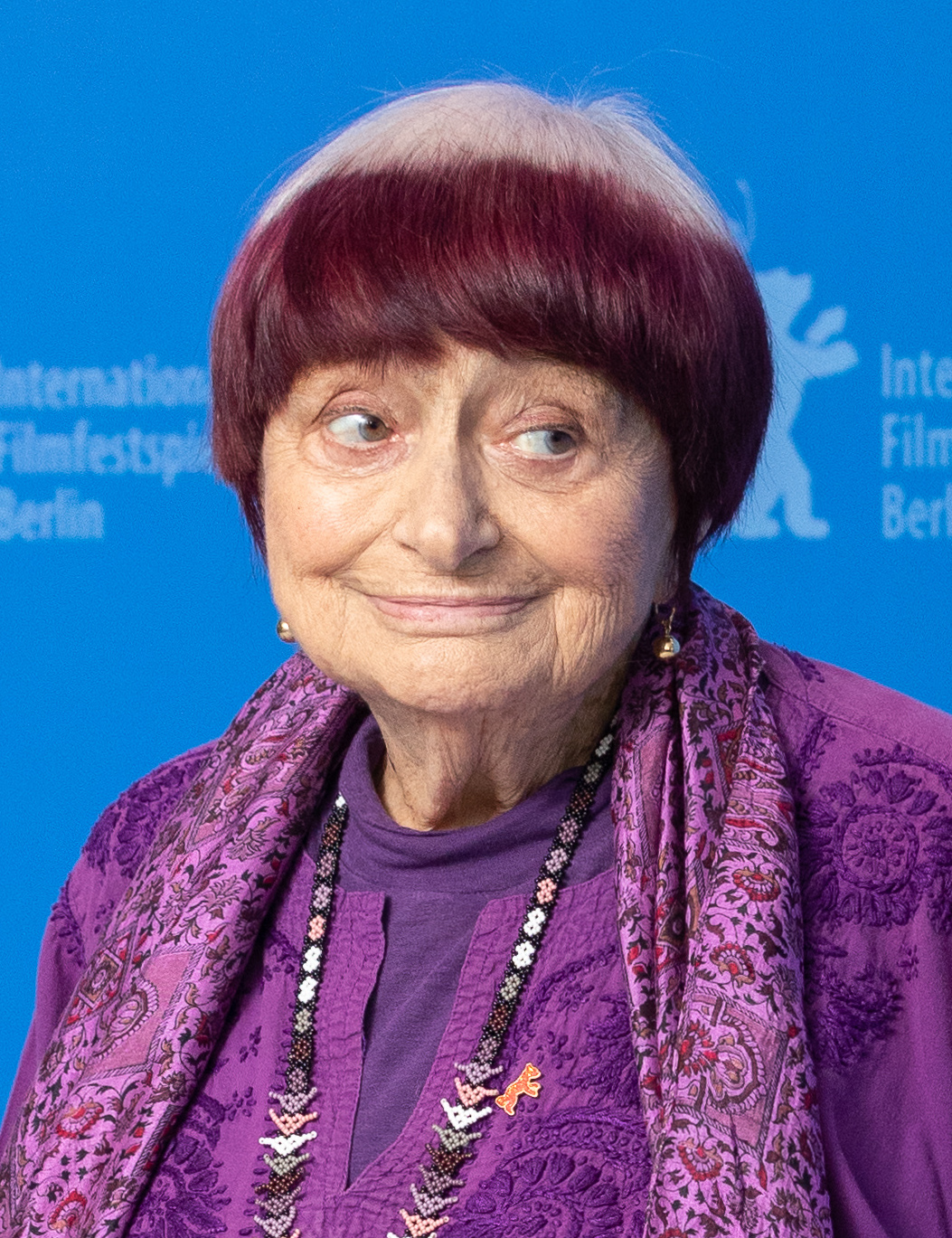
Agnès Varda, 2017 recipient

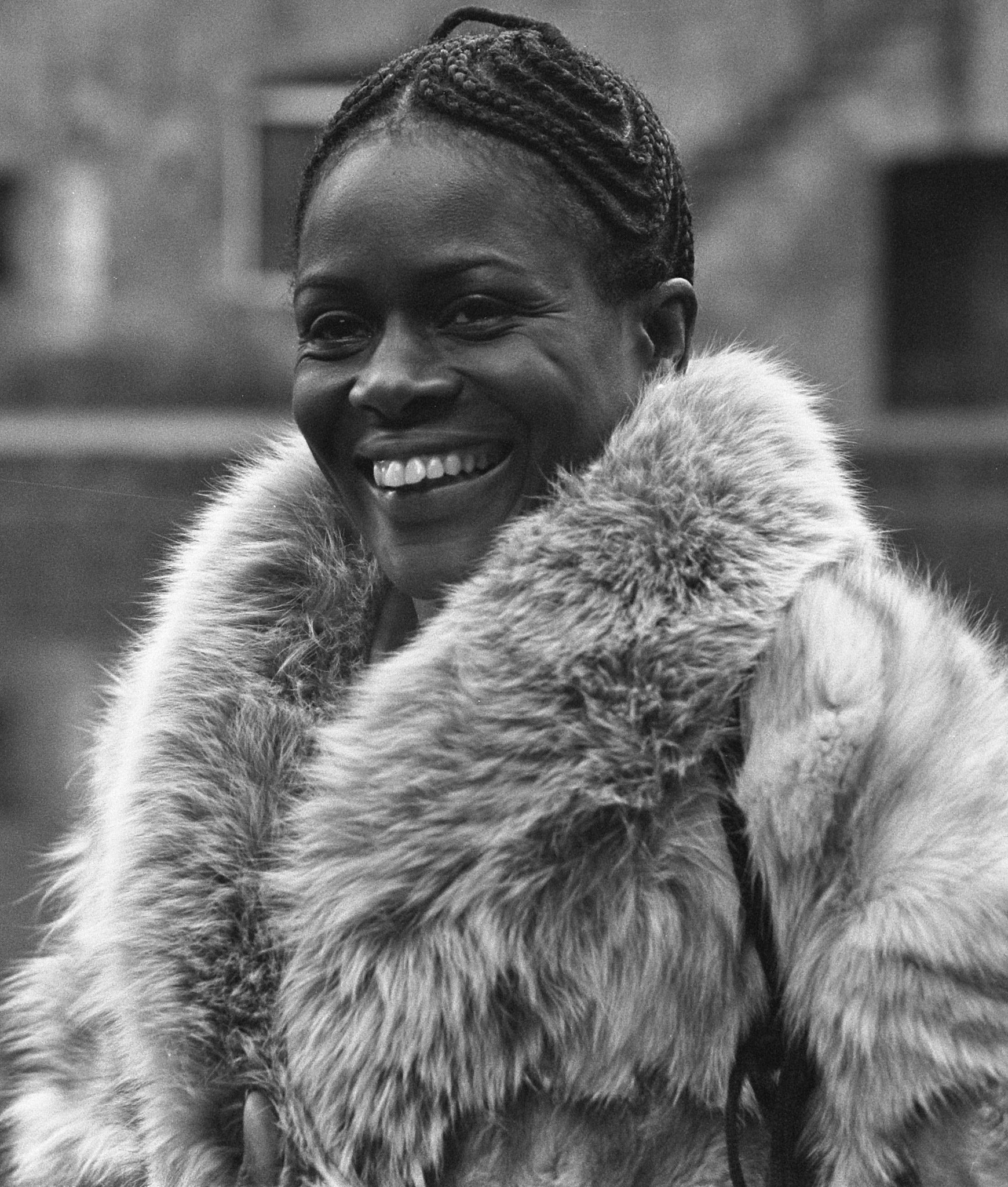
Cicely Tyson, 2018 recipient

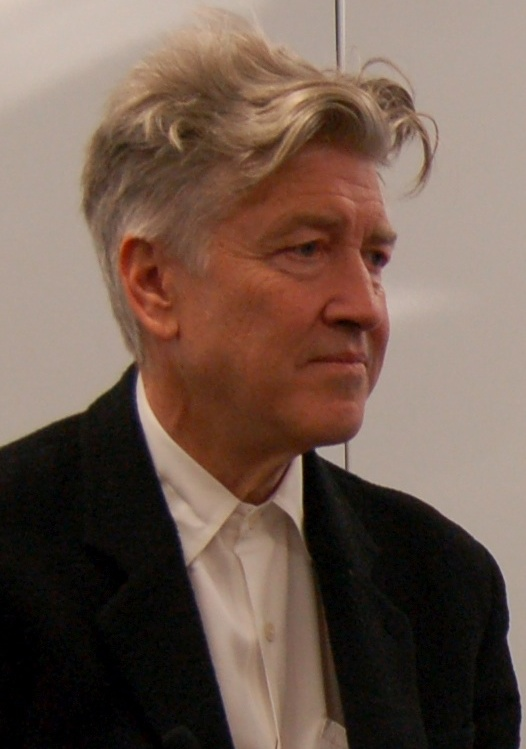
David Lynch, 2019 recipient

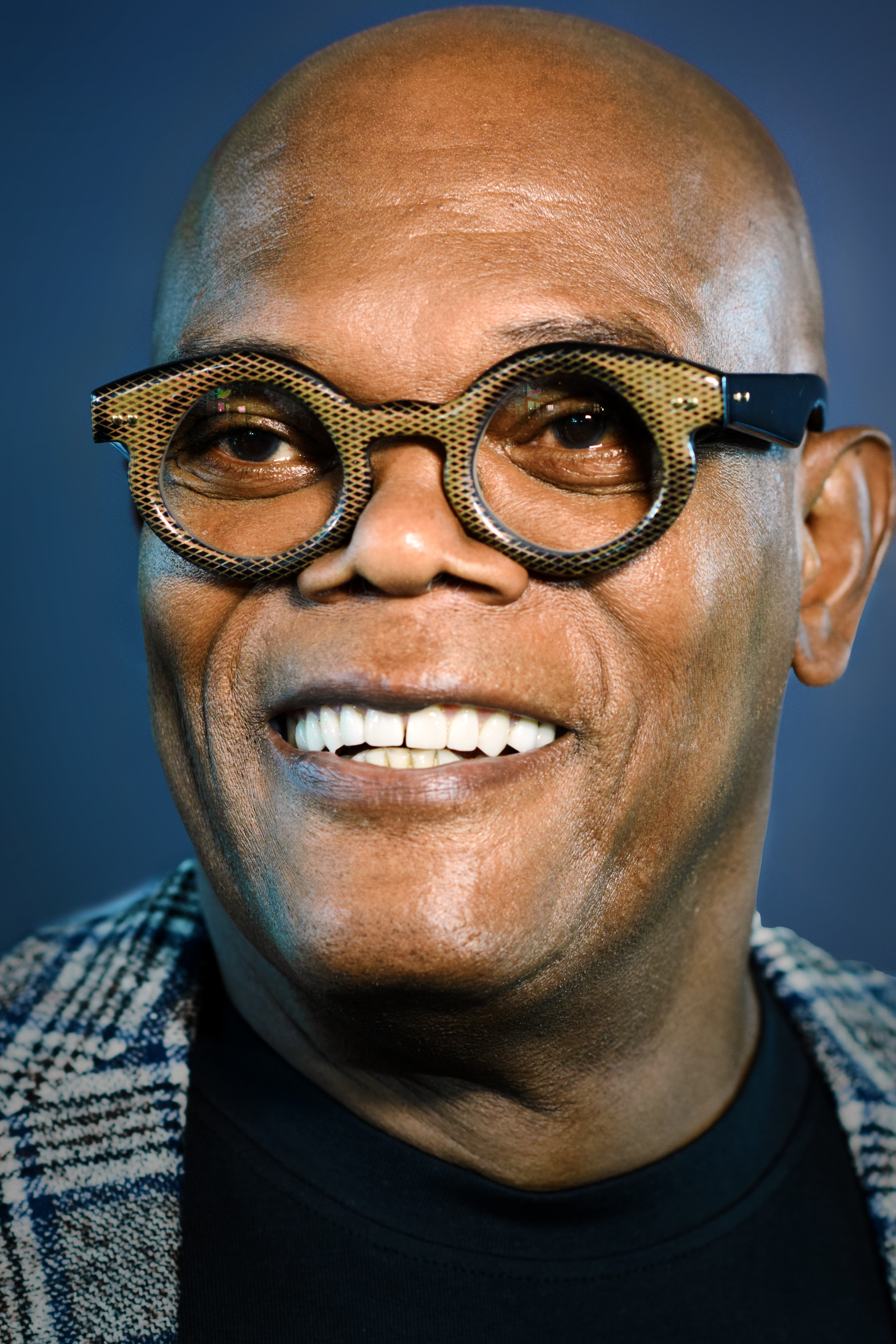
Samuel L. Jackson, 2021 recipient

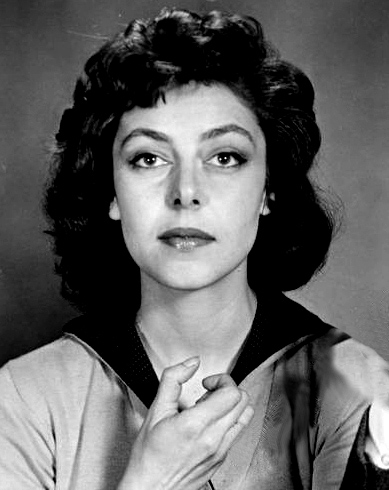
Elaine May, 2021 recipient

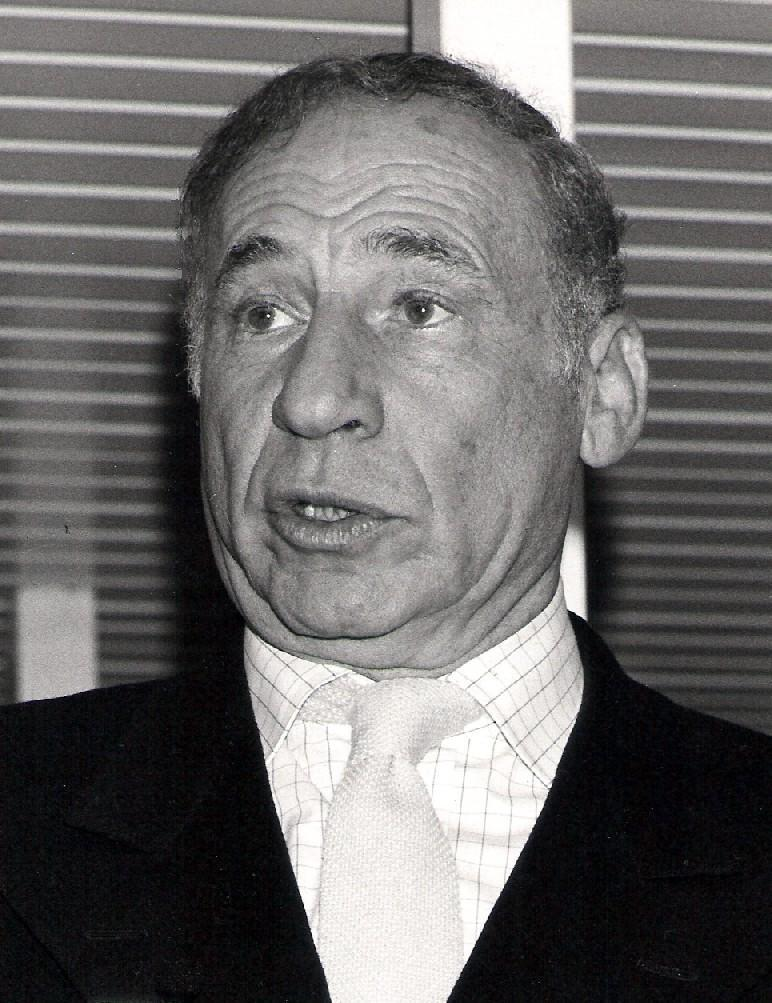
Mel Brooks, 2023 recipient

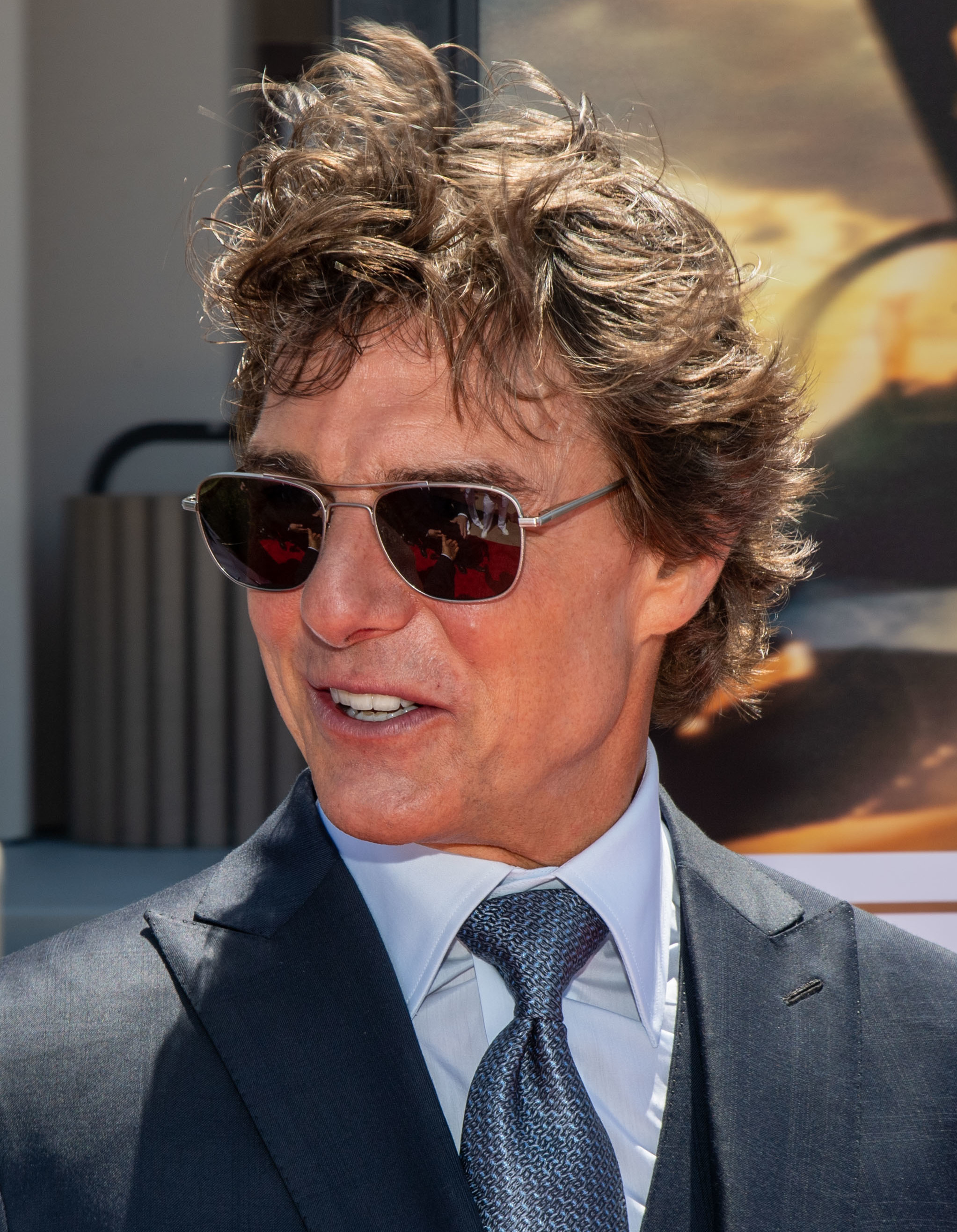
Tom Cruise, 2025 recipient

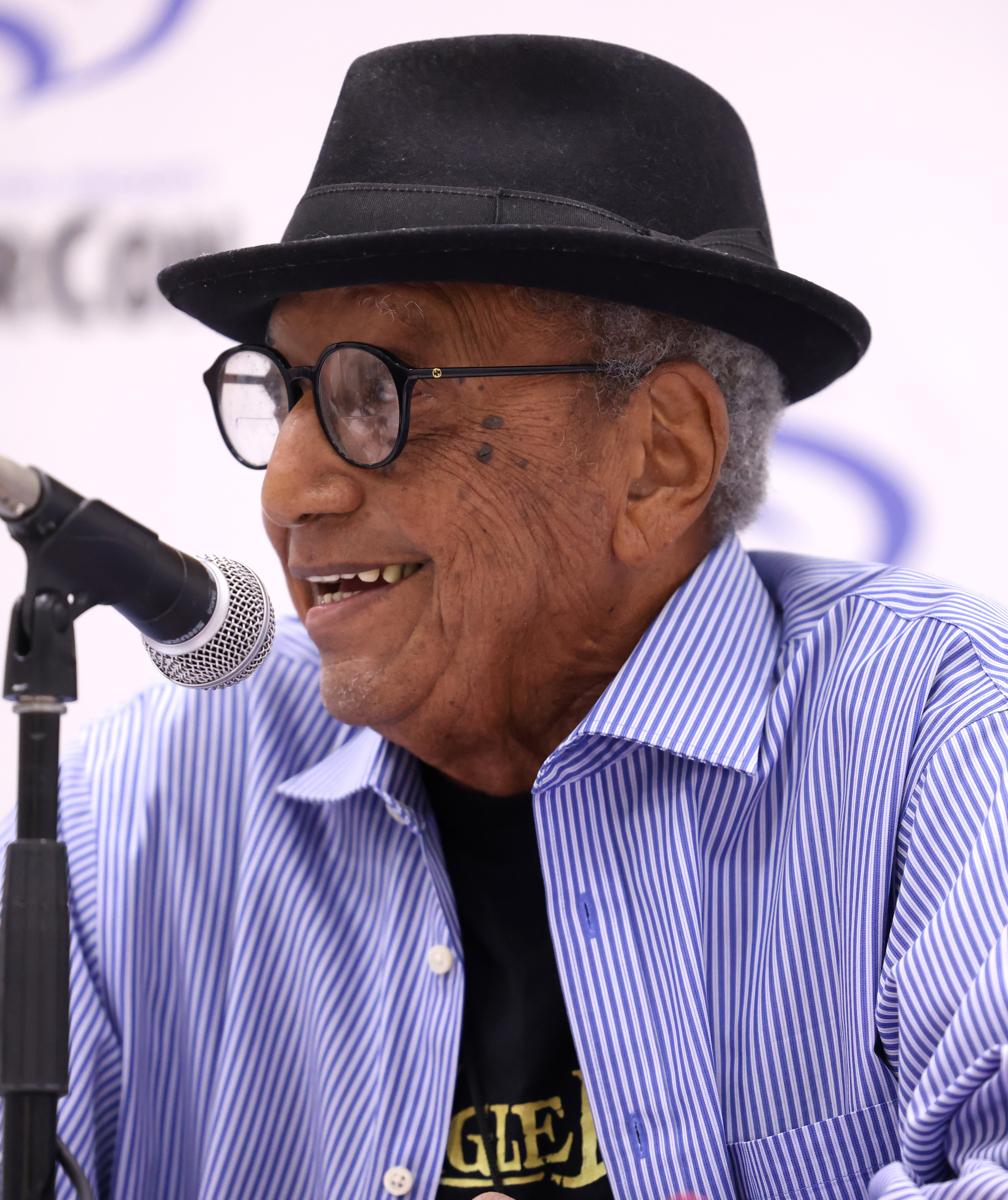
Floyd Norman, 2026 recipient

Years for which the Special Award and Honorary Award recipients received their awards and the annual Academy Awards ceremonies at which they received them provided within parentheses throughout (as pertinent) follow this information for recipients listed in the Official Academy Award Database and Web-based official AMPAS documents.

Bob Hope was honored on four occasions.

=== 1920s ===
Year	Recipient	Notes	Award Format
1927/1928	Warner Bros.	"for producing The Jazz Singer (1927), the pioneer outstanding talking picture, which has revolutionized the industry."	Statuette
1927/1928	Charlie Chaplin	"for acting, writing, directing, and producing The Circus (1928)."	Statuette

=== 1930s ===
Year	Recipient	Notes	Award Format
1931/1932	Walt Disney	"for the creation of Mickey Mouse."	Statuette
1934	Shirley Temple	"in grateful recognition of her outstanding contribution to screen entertainment during the year 1934."	Miniature statuette
1935	D. W. Griffith	"For his distinguished creative achievements as director and producer and his invaluable initiative and lasting contributions to the progress of the motion picture arts."	Statuette
1936	The March of Time	"for its significance to motion pictures and for having revolutionized one of the most important branches of the industry – the newsreel."	—
1936	W. Howard Greene and Harold Rosson	"for the color cinematography of the Selznick International Production, The Garden of Allah."	Plaque
1937	Edgar Bergen	"for his outstanding comedy creation, 'Charlie McCarthy'."	Wooden statuette, with movable mouth
1937	W. Howard Greene	"for the color photography of A Star Is Born."	Plaque
1937	Museum of Modern Art Film Library	"for its significant work in collecting films dating from 1895 to the present and for the first time making available to the public the means of studying the historical and aesthetic development of the motion picture as one of the major arts."	Scroll certificate
1937	Mack Sennett	"for his lasting contribution to the comedy technique of the screen, the basic principles of which are as important today as when they were first put into practice, the Academy presents a Special Award to that master of fun, discoverer of stars, sympathetic, kindly, understanding comedy genius – Mack Sennett."	Statuette
1938	J. Arthur Ball	"for his outstanding contributions to the advancement of color in Motion Picture Photography."	Scroll
1938	Walt Disney	"for Snow White and the Seven Dwarfs [1937], recognized as a significant screen innovation which has charmed millions and pioneered a great new entertainment field for the motion picture cartoon."	One statuette and seven miniature statuettes on a stepped base
1938	Deanna Durbin and Mickey Rooney	"for their significant contribution in bringing to the screen the spirit and personification of youth, and as juvenile players setting a high standard of ability and achievement."	Miniature statuette
1938	Gordon Jennings, Jan Domela, Devereaux Jennings, Irmin Roberts, Art Smith, Farciot Edouart, Loyal Griggs, Loren L. Ryder, Harry D. Mills, Louis Mesenkop, Walter Oberst	"for outstanding achievement in creating Special Photographic and Sound Effects in the Paramount production, Spawn of the North."	Plaque
1938	Oliver T. Marsh and Allen Davey	"for the color cinematography of the Metro-Goldwyn-Mayer production, Sweethearts."	Plaque
1938	Harry Warner	"in recognition of patriotic service in the production of historical short subjects presenting significant episodes in the early struggle of the American people for liberty."	Scroll
1939	Douglas Fairbanks	"recognizing the unique and outstanding contribution of Douglas Fairbanks, first President of the Academy, to the international development of the motion picture."	Statuette
1939	Judy Garland	"for her outstanding performance as a screen juvenile during the past year."	Miniature statuette
1939	William Cameron Menzies	"for outstanding achievement in the use of color for the enhancement of dramatic mood in the production of Gone with the Wind."	Plaque
1939	Motion Picture Relief Fund	acknowledging the outstanding services to the industry during the past year of the Motion Picture Relief Fund and its progressive leadership. Presented to Jean Hersholt, President; Ralph Morgan, Chairman of the Executive Committee; Ralph Block, First Vice-President; and Conrad Nagel.	Plaque
1939	Technicolor USA	"for its contributions in successfully bringing three-color feature production to the screen."	Statuette

=== 1940s ===
Year	Recipient	Notes	Award Format
1940	Bob Hope	"in recognition of his unselfish services to the Motion Picture Industry."	Silver plaque
1940	Nathan Levinson	"for his outstanding service to the industry and the Army during the past nine years, which has made possible the present efficient mobilization of the motion picture industry facilities for the production of Army Training Films."	Statuette
1941	Walt Disney, William Garity, John N. A. Hawkins, and the RCA Manufacturing Company	"for their outstanding contribution to the advancement of the use of sound in motion pictures through the production of Fantasia."	Certificate of Merit
1941	Leopold Stokowski and his associates	"for their unique achievement in the creation of a new form of visualized music in Walt Disney's production, Fantasia, thereby widening the scope of the motion picture as entertainment and as an art form. "	Certificate of Merit
1941	Rey Scott	"for his extraordinary achievement in producing Kukan, the film record of China's struggle, including its photography with a 16mm camera under the most difficult and dangerous conditions."	Certificate of Merit
1941	British Ministry of Information	"for its vivid and dramatic presentation of the heroism of the RAF in the documentary film, Target for Tonight.	Certificate of Merit
1942	Charles Boyer	"for his progressive cultural achievement in establishing the French Research Foundation in Los Angeles as a source of reference for the Hollywood Motion Picture Industry"	Certificate of Merit
1942	Noël Coward	"for his outstanding production achievement in In Which We Serve"	Certificate of Merit
1942	Metro-Goldwyn-Mayer	"for its achievement in representing the American Way of Life in the production of the 'Andy Hardy' series of films."	Certificate of Merit
1943	George Pal	"for the development of novel methods and techniques in the production of short subjects known as Puppetoons."	Plaque; replaced with statuette in 1967
1944	Bob Hope	"for his many services to the Academy."	Life membership in the Academy of Motion Picture Arts and Sciences
1944	Margaret O'Brien	"outstanding child actress of 1944."	Miniature Statuette (presented in 1946)
1945	Republic Studio, Daniel J. Bloomberg and the Republic Studio Sound Department	"for the building of an outstanding musical scoring auditorium which provides optimum recording conditions and combines all elements of acoustic and engineering design.	Certificate (presented in 1946)
1945	Walter Wanger	"for his six years service as President of the Academy of Motion Picture Arts and Sciences."	Special Plaque
1945	The House I Live In	tolerance short subject; produced by Frank Ross and Mervyn LeRoy; directed by Mervyn LeRoy; screenplay by Albert Maltz; song "The House I Live In", music by Earl Robinson, lyrics by Lewis Allan; starring Frank Sinatra; released by RKO Radio.	Certificate
1945	Peggy Ann Garner	"outstanding child actress of 1945."	Miniature Statuette (presented in 1947)
1946	Harold Russell	"for bringing hope and courage to his fellow veterans through his appearance in The Best Years of Our Lives"	Statuette
1946	Laurence Olivier	"for his outstanding achievement as actor, producer and director in bringing Henry V to the screen."	Statuette
1946	Ernst Lubitsch	"for his distinguished contributions to the art of the motion picture."	Certificate
1946	Claude Jarman Jr.	"outstanding child actor of 1946"	Miniature Statuette
1947	James Baskett	"for his able and heart-warming characterization of Uncle Remus, friend and story teller to the children of the world in Walt Disney's Song of the South."	Statuette
1947	Thomas Armat, Colonel William N. Selig, Albert E. Smith, and George Kirke Spoor	members of "the small group of pioneers whose belief in a new medium, and whose contributions to its development, blazed the trail along which the motion picture has progressed, in their lifetime, from obscurity to world-wide acclaim."	Statuette
1947	Bill and Coo	"in which artistry and patience blended in a novel and entertaining use of the medium of motion pictures."	Plaque; replaced with Statuette in 1976
1947	Shoe-Shine (Italian: Sciuscià)	the high quality of this motion picture, brought to eloquent life in a country scarred by war, is proof to the world that the creative spirit can triumph over adversity.	Statuette
1948	Walter Wanger	"for distinguished service to the industry in adding to its moral stature in the world community by his production of the picture Joan of Arc."	Statuette
1948	Monsieur Vincent	voted by the Academy Board of Governors as the most outstanding foreign language film released in the United States during 1948.	Statuette
1948	Sid Grauman	"master showman, who raised the standard of exhibition of motion pictures."	Statuette
1948	Adolph Zukor	"a man who has been called the father of the feature film in America, for his services to the industry over a period of forty years."	Statuette
1948	Ivan Jandl	"for the outstanding juvenile performance of 1948, as Karel Malik in The Search."	Miniature Statuette
1949	Jean Hersholt	"in recognition of his service to the Academy during four terms as president."	Statuette on a square wood base
1949	Fred Astaire	"for his unique artistry and his contributions to the technique of musical pictures."	Statuette
1949	Cecil B. DeMille	"distinguished motion picture pioneer for 37 years of brilliant showmanship."	Statuette
1949	The Bicycle Thief (Italian: Ladri di biciclette)	voted by the Academy Board of Governors as the most outstanding foreign language film released in the United States during 1949.	Statuette
1949	Bobby Driscoll	"as the outstanding juvenile actor of 1949."	Miniature Statuette

=== 1950s ===
Year	Recipient	Notes	Award Format
1951	Louis B. Mayer	"for distinguished service to the motion picture industry."	Statuette
1951	George Murphy	"for his services in interpreting the film industry to the country at large."	Statuette
1951	The Walls of Malapaga (Italian: Le mura di Malapaga, French: Au-delà des grilles)	voted by the Board of Governors as the most outstanding foreign language film released in the United States in 1950.	Statuette
1952	Gene Kelly	"in appreciation of his versatility as an actor, singer, director and dancer, and specifically for his brilliant achievements in the art of choreography on film."	Statuette
1952	Rashomon	voted by the Board of Governors as the most outstanding foreign language film released in the United States during 1951.	Statuette
1953	Merian C. Cooper	"for his many innovations and contributions to the art of motion pictures."	Statuette
1953	Bob Hope	"for his contribution to the laughter of the world, his service to the motion picture industry, and his devotion to the American premise."	Statuette
1953	Harold Lloyd	"master comedian and good citizen."	Statuette
1953	George Mitchell	"for the design and development of the camera which bears his name and for his continued and dominant presence in the field of cinematography."	Statuette
1953	Joseph M. Schenck	"for long and distinguished service to the motion picture industry."	Statuette
1953	Forbidden Games (French: Jeux interdits)	Best Foreign Language Film first released in the United States during 1952.	Statuette
1954	Twentieth Century-Fox Film Corporation	"in recognition of their imagination, showmanship and foresight in introducing the revolutionary process known as CinemaScope."	Statuette
1954	Bell and Howell Company	"for their pioneering and basic achievements in the advancement of the motion picture industry."	Statuette
1954	Joseph Breen	"for his conscientious, open-minded and dignified management of the Motion Picture Production Code"	Statuette
1954	Pete Smith	"for his witty and pungent observations on the American scene in his series of 'Pete Smith Specialties'."	Statuette
1955	Bausch & Lomb Optical Company	"for their contributions to the advancement of the motion picture industry."	Statuette
1955	Danny Kaye	"for his unique talents, his service to the Academy, the motion picture industry, and the American people."	Statuette
1955	Kemp Niver	"for the development of the Renovare Process which has made possible the restoration of the Library of Congress Paper Film Collection."	Statuette
1955	Greta Garbo	"for her unforgettable screen performances."	Statuette
1955	Jon Whiteley	"for his outstanding juvenile performance in The Little Kidnappers"	Miniature Statuette
1955	Vincent Winter	"for his outstanding juvenile performance in The Little Kidnappers"	Miniature Statuette
1955	Gate of Hell (Japanese: Jigokumon)	Best Foreign Language Film first released in the United States during 1954.	Statuette
1956	Samurai, The Legend of Musashi	Best Foreign Language Film first released in the United States during 1955.	Statuette
1957	Eddie Cantor	"for distinguished service to the film industry."	Statuette
1958	Society of Motion Picture and Television Engineers (SMPTE)	"for their contributions to the advancement of the motion picture industry."	Statuette
1958	Gilbert M. "Broncho Billy" Anderson	"motion picture pioneer, for his contributions to the development of motion pictures as entertainment."	Statuette
1958	Charles Brackett	"for outstanding service to the Academy."	Statuette
1958	B. B. Kahane	"for distinguished service to the motion picture industry."	Statuette
1959	Maurice Chevalier	"for his contributions to the world of entertainment for more than half a century."	Statuette

=== 1960s ===
Year	Recipient	Presenter	Notes	Award Format
1960	Buster Keaton	B. B. Kahane	"for his unique talents which brought immortal comedies to the screen."	
1960	Lee de Forest		"for his pioneering inventions which brought sound to the motion picture."	
1961	Gary Cooper	William Wyler	"for his many memorable screen performances and the international recognition he, as an individual, has gained for the motion picture industry."	Statuette
1961	Stan Laurel	Danny Kaye	"for his creative pioneering in the field of cinema comedy."	Statuette
1961	Hayley Mills	Shirley Temple	"for Pollyanna, the most outstanding juvenile performance during 1960."	Miniature Statuette
1962	William L. Hendricks	Greer Garson	"for his outstanding patriotic service in the conception, writing and production of the Marine Corps film, A Force in Readiness, which has brought honor to the Academy and the motion picture industry."	Statuette
1962	Fred L. Metzler	Wendell Corey	"for his dedication and outstanding service to the Academy of Motion Picture Arts and Sciences."	Statuette
1962	Jerome Robbins	Gene Kelly	"for his brilliant achievements in the art of choreography on film."	Statuette
1965	William J. Tuttle	Rosalind Russell	"for his outstanding make-up achievement for 7 Faces of Dr. Lao."	Statuette
1966	Bob Hope	Arthur Freed	"for unique and distinguished service to our industry and the Academy."	Gold Medal
1967	Yakima Canutt	Charlton Heston	"for achievements as a stunt man and for developing safety devices to protect stunt men everywhere."	Statuette
1967	Y. Frank Freeman	Jack Valenti	"for unusual and outstanding service to the Academy during his thirty years in Hollywood."	Statuette
1968	Arthur Freed	Bob Hope	"for distinguished service to the Academy and the production of six top-rated Awards telecasts."	Statuette
1969	John Chambers	Walter Matthau	"for his outstanding makeup achievement for Planet of the Apes."	Statuette
1969	Onna White	Mark Lester	"for her outstanding choreography achievement for Oliver!."	Statuette

=== 1970s ===
Year	Recipient	Presenter	Notes	Award Format
1970	Cary Grant	Frank Sinatra	"for his unique mastery of the art of screen acting with the respect and affection of his colleagues."	
1971	Lillian Gish	Melvyn Douglas	"for superlative artistry and for distinguished contribution to the progress of motion pictures."	Statuette
1971	Orson Welles	John Huston	"for superlative artistry and versatility in the creation of motion pictures."	Statuette
1972	Charles Chaplin	Daniel Taradash	"for the incalculable effect he has had in making motion pictures the art form of this century."	Statuette
1973	Charles Boren	Richard Walsh	"Leader for 38 years of the industry's enlightened labor relations and architect of its policy of non-discrimination. With the respect and affection of all who work in films."	Statuette
1973	Edward G. Robinson (Posthumous)	Charlton Heston	"who achieved greatness as a player, a patron of the arts and a dedicated citizen...in sum, a Renaissance man. From his friends in the industry he loves."	Statuette
1974	Henri Langlois	Jack Valenti	"for his devotion to the art of film, his massive contributions in preserving its past and his unswerving faith in its future."	Statuette
1974	Groucho Marx	Jack Lemmon	"in recognition of his brilliant creativity and for the unequalled achievements of the Marx Brothers in the art of motion picture comedy."	Statuette
1975	Howard Hawks	John Wayne	"A master American filmmaker whose creative efforts hold a distinguished place in world cinema."	Statuette
1975	Jean Renoir	Ingrid Bergman	"a genius who, with grace, responsibility and enviable devotion through silent film, sound film, feature, documentary and television, has won the world's admiration."	Statuette
1976	Mary Pickford	Walter Mirisch	"in recognition of her unique contributions to the film industry and the development of film as an artistic medium."	Statuette
1978	Margaret Booth	Olivia de Havilland	"for her exceptional contribution to the art of film editing in the motion picture industry."	Statuette
1979	Walter Lantz	Robin Williams & Woody Woodpecker	"for bringing joy and laughter to every part of the world through his unique animated motion pictures."	Statuette
1979	Laurence Olivier	Cary Grant	"for the full body of his work, for the unique achievements of his entire career and his lifetime of contribution to the art of film."	Statuette
1979	King Vidor	Audrey Hepburn	"for his incomparable achievements as a cinematic creator and innovator."	Statuette
1979	Museum of Modern Art Department of Film	Gregory Peck	"for the contribution it has made to the public's perception of movies as an art form."	Statuette

=== 1980s ===
Year	Recipient	Presenter	Notes	Award Format
1980	Hal Elias	Walter Mirisch	"for his dedication and distinguished service to the Academy of Motion Picture Arts and Sciences."	
1980	Alec Guinness	Dustin Hoffman	"for advancing the art of screen acting through a host of memorable and distinguished performances."	
1981	Henry Fonda	Robert Redford	"the consummate actor, in recognition of his brilliant accomplishments and enduring contribution to the art of motion pictures."	Statuette
1982	Barbara Stanwyck	John Travolta	"for superlative creativity and unique contribution to the art of screen acting."	Statuette
1983	Mickey Rooney	Bob Hope	"in recognition of his 60 years of versatility in a variety of memorable film performances."	Statuette
1984	Hal Roach	Jackie Cooper	"in recognition of his unparalleled record of distinguished contributions to the motion picture art form."	Statuette
1985	James Stewart	Cary Grant	"for his fifty years of memorable performances. For his high ideals both on and off the screen. With the respect and affection of his colleagues."	Statuette
1985	The National Endowment for the Arts	Glenn Close	"in recognition of its 20th anniversary and its dedicated commitment to fostering artistic and creative activity and excellence in every area of the arts."	Statuette
1986	Paul Newman	Sally Field	"in recognition of his many and memorable compelling screen performances and for his personal integrity and dedication to his craft."	Statuette
1986	Alex North	Quincy Jones	"in recognition of his brilliant artistry in the creation of memorable music for a host of distinguished motion pictures."	Statuette
1987	Ralph Bellamy	Karl Malden	"for his unique artistry and his distinguished service to the profession of acting."	Statuette
1989	Eastman Kodak Company		"in recognition of the company's fundamental contributions to the art of motion pictures during the first century of film history."	Statuette
1989	National Film Board of Canada	Donald Sutherland & Kiefer Sutherland	"in recognition of its 50th anniversary and its dedicated commitment to originate artistic, creative and technological activity and excellence in every area of film making."	Statuette

=== 1990s ===
Year	Recipient	Branch	Presenter	Notes	Award Format
1990	Akira Kurosawa	Director	Steven Spielberg & George Lucas	"for cinematic accomplishments that have inspired, delighted, enriched and entertained worldwide audiences and influenced filmmakers throughout the world."	
1991	Sophia Loren	Actor	Gregory Peck	"one of the genuine treasures of world cinema who, in a career rich with memorable performances, has added permanent luster to our art form."	Statuette
1991	Myrna Loy	Actor	Anjelica Huston	"in recognition of her extraordinary qualities both on screen and off, with appreciation for a lifetime's worth of indelible performances."	Statuette
1992	Satyajit Ray	Director	Audrey Hepburn	"in recognition of his rare mastery of the art of motion pictures, and of his profound humanitarian outlook, which has had an indelible influence on filmmakers and audiences throughout the world."	Statuette
1993	Federico Fellini	Director	Sophia Loren and Marcello Mastroianni	"in recognition of his cinematic accomplishments that have thrilled and entertained worldwide audiences."	Statuette
1994	Deborah Kerr	Actor	Glenn Close	"in appreciation for a full career's worth of elegant and beautifully crafted performances."	Statuette
1995	Michelangelo Antonioni	Director	Jack Nicholson	"in recognition of his place as one of the cinema's master visual stylists."	Statuette
1996	Kirk Douglas	Actor	Steven Spielberg	"for 50 years as a creative and moral force in the motion picture community."	Statuette
1996	Chuck Jones	Animator	Robin Williams	"for the creation of classic cartoons and cartoon characters whose animated lives have brought joy to our real ones for more than a half century."	Statuette
1997	Michael Kidd	Actor	Julie Andrews	"in recognition of his services to the art of the dance in the art of the screen."	Statuette
1998	Stanley Donen	Director	Martin Scorsese	"in appreciation of a body of work marked by grace, elegance, wit and visual innovation."	Statuette
1999	Elia Kazan	Director	Martin Scorsese, & Robert De Niro	"in appreciation of a long, distinguished and unparalleled career during which he has influenced the very nature of filmmaking through his creation of cinematic masterpieces."	Statuette

=== 2000s ===
Year	Recipient	Branch	Presenter	Notes	Award Format
2000	Andrzej Wajda	Director	Jane Fonda	"in recognition of five decades of extraordinary film direction."	
2001	Jack Cardiff	Cinematographer	Dustin Hoffman	"master of light and color."	Statuette
2001	Ernest Lehman	Screenwriter	Julie Andrews	"in appreciation of a body of varied and enduring work."	Statuette
2002	Sidney Poitier	Actor	Denzel Washington	"in recognition of his remarkable accomplishments as an artist and as a human."	Statuette
2002	Robert Redford	Actor	Barbra Streisand	"Actor, director, producer, creator of Sundance, inspiration to independent and innovative filmmakers everywhere."	Statuette
2003	Peter O'Toole	Actor	Meryl Streep	"whose remarkable talents have provided cinema history with some of its most memorable characters."	Statuette
2004	Blake Edwards	Director	Jim Carrey	"in recognition of his writing, directing and producing an extraordinary body of work for the screen."	Statuette
2005	Sidney Lumet	Director	Al Pacino	"in recognition of his brilliant services to screenwriters, performers and the art of the motion picture."	Statuette
2006	Robert Altman	Director	Meryl Streep & Lily Tomlin	"in recognition of a career that has repeatedly reinvented the art form and inspired filmmakers and audiences alike."	Statuette
2007	Ennio Morricone	Composer	Clint Eastwood	"in recognition of his magnificent and multifaceted contributions to the art of film music."	Statuette
2008	Robert F. Boyle	Art Director	Nicole Kidman	"in recognition of one of cinema's great careers in art direction."	Statuette
2009	Lauren Bacall	Actor	Anjelica Huston	"in recognition of her central place in the Golden Age of motion pictures."	Statuette
2009	Roger Corman	Director	Jonathan Demme & Quentin Tarantino	"for his rich engendering of films and filmmakers."	Statuette
2009	Gordon Willis	Cinematographer	Caleb Deschanel	"for unsurpassed mastery of light, shadow, color and motion."	Statuette

=== 2010s ===
Year	Recipient	Branch	Presenter	Notes	Award Format
2010	Kevin Brownlow	Film Historian	Kevin Spacey	"for the wise and devoted chronicling of the cinematic parade."	Statuette
2010	Jean-Luc Godard	Director	—N/a	"for passion. for confrontation. for a new kind of cinema."	Statuette
2010	Eli Wallach	Actor	Clint Eastwood	"for a lifetime's worth of indelible screen characters."	Statuette
2011	James Earl Jones	Actor	Ben Kingsley	"for his legacy of consistent excellence and uncommon versatility"	Statuette
2011	Dick Smith	Makeup and Hair	Rick Baker	"for his unparalleled mastery of texture, shade, form and illusion"	Statuette
2012	D. A. Pennebaker	Documentarian	Michael Moore	"..[H]as inspired generations of filmmakers with his "you are here" style. He is considered one of the founders of the cinéma vérité movement..."	Statuette
2012	Hal Needham	Stuntman	Quentin Tarantino	"A pioneer in improving stunt technology and safety procedures..."	Statuette
2012	George Stevens Jr.	Director	Sidney Poitier	"A tireless champion of the arts in America and especially that most American of arts: the Hollywood film"	Statuette
2013	Angela Lansbury	Actor	Robert Osborne	"an entertainment icon who has created some of cinema's most memorable characters, inspiring generations of actors."	Statuette
2013	Steve Martin	Comedian-Actor	Tom Hanks	"in recognition of his extraordinary talents and the unique inspiration he has brought to the art of motion pictures."	Statuette
2013	Piero Tosi	Costumer Designer	Jeffrey Kurland	"a visionary whose incomparable costume designs shaped timeless, living art in motion pictures." Kurland presented the award to Claudia Cardinale on Tosi's behalf	Statuette
2014	Jean-Claude Carrière	Screenwriter	Philip Kaufman	"To Jean-Claude Carrière, whose elegantly crafted screenplays elevate the art of screenwriting to the level of literature."	Statuette
2014	Hayao Miyazaki	Animator	John Lasseter	"has deeply influenced animation forever, inspiring generations of artists to work in our medium and illuminate its limitless potential..."	Statuette
2014	Maureen O'Hara	Actor	Clint Eastwood and Liam Neeson	"One of Hollywood's brightest stars, whose inspiring performances glowed with passion, warmth and strength."	Statuette
2015	Spike Lee	Director	Denzel Washington, Samuel L. Jackson, & Wesley Snipes	"a champion of independent film and an inspiration to young filmmakers"	Statuette
2015	Gena Rowlands	Actor	Nick Cassavetes	"an original talent whose devotion to her craft has earned her worldwide recognition as an independent film icon"	Statuette
2016	Jackie Chan	Actor / Stuntman	Chris Tucker	"Chan starred in – and sometimes wrote, directed and produced – more than 30 martial arts features in his native Hong Kong, charming audiences with his dazzling athleticism, inventive stunt work and boundless charisma."	Statuette
2016	Lynn Stalmaster	Casting Director	Jeff Bridges	"over five decades, he applied his talents to more than 200 feature films... and has been instrumental in the careers of celebrated actors"	Statuette
2016	Anne V. Coates	Film Editor	Richard Gere	"in her more than 60 years as a film editor, she has worked side by side with many leading directors on an impressive range of films"	Statuette
2016	Frederick Wiseman	Documentarian	Ben Kingsley	"Wiseman has made one film almost every year since 1967, illuminating lives in the context of social, cultural and government institutions"	Statuette
2017	Charles Burnett	Film Director	Ava DuVernay	"a resolutely independent and influential film pioneer who has chronicled the lives of black Americans with eloquence and insight"	Statuette
2017	Owen Roizman	Cinematographer	Dustin Hoffman	"his expansive visual style and technical innovation have advanced the art of cinematography"	Statuette
2017	Donald Sutherland	Actor	Jennifer Lawrence	"for a lifetime of indelible characters, rendered with unwavering truthfulness"	Statuette
2017	Agnès Varda	Director	Angelina Jolie	"her compassion and curiosity inform a uniquely personal cinema"	Statuette
2018	Marvin Levy	Film publicist	Tom Hanks, Laura Dern	"for an exemplary career in publicity that has brought films to the minds, hearts and souls of audiences all over the world"	Statuette
2018	Lalo Schifrin	Composer	Clint Eastwood	"in recognition of his unique musical style, compositional integrity and influential contributions to the art of film scoring"	Statuette
2018	Cicely Tyson	Actor	Ava DuVernay	"whose unforgettable performances and personal integrity have inspired generations of filmmakers, actors and audiences"	Statuette
2019	David Lynch	Director	Isabella Rossellini, Laura Dern, & Kyle MacLachlan	"for fearlessly breaking boundaries in pursuit of his singular cinematic vision."	Statuette
2019	Wes Studi	Actor	Christian Bale	"in recognition of the power and craft he brings to his indelible film portrayals and for his steadfast support of the Native American community."	Statuette
2019	Lina Wertmüller	Director	Greta Gerwig & Jane Campion	"for her provocative disruption of political and social norms delivered with bravery through her weapon of choice: the camera lens."	Statuette

=== 2020s ===
Year	Recipient	Branch	Presenter	Notes	Award Format
2021	Samuel L. Jackson	Actor	Denzel Washington	"whose dynamic performances resonate across genres and generations of audiences worldwide."	Statuette
2021	Elaine May	Director	Bill Murray	"writer, director, performer, pioneer whose bracing comedic spark illuminates us all."	Statuette
2021	Liv Ullmann	Actor	John Lithgow	"for her deeply affecting screen portrayals and lifelong commitment to exploring the human condition."	Statuette
2022	Euzhan Palcy	Director	Viola Davis	"a masterful filmmaker who broke ground for Black women directors and inspired storytellers of all kinds across the globe."	Statuette
2022	Diane Warren	Songwriter	Cher	"for her genius, generosity and passionate commitment to the power of song in film."	Statuette
2022	Peter Weir	Director	Jeff Bridges	"a fearless and consummate filmmaker who has illuminated the human experience with his unique and expansive body of work."	Statuette
2023	Angela Bassett	Actor	Regina King	"Across her decades-long career, she has continued to deliver transcendent performances that set new standards in acting".	Statuette
2023	Mel Brooks	Director	Nathan Lane & Matthew Broderick	He has "lit up our hearts with his humor and his legacy has made a lasting impact on every facet of entertainment".	Statuette
2023	Carol Littleton	Film Editor	Glenn Close	"Littleton's career in film editing serves as a model for those who come after her".	Statuette
2024	Quincy Jones (posthumous)	Composer	Jamie Foxx	"His artistic genius and relentless creativity have made him one of the most influential musical figures of all time".	Statuette
2024	Juliet Taylor	Casting Director	Nicole Kidman	Awarded for having "cast iconic and beloved films and paved a new path for the field".	Statuette
2025	Debbie Allen	Choreographer and actress	Cynthia Erivo	For the one whose "work has captivated generations and crossed genres".	Statuette
2025	Tom Cruise	Actor and film producer	Alejandro González Iñárritu	For his "incredible commitment to our filmmaking and stunts community as well as to the theatrical experience".	Statuette
2025	Wynn Thomas	Production designer	Octavia Spencer	For "having brought some of the most enduring films to life through a visionary eye and mastery of his craft".	Statuette
2026	Glenn Close	Actor	John Malkovich	For her "unparalleled emotional range which has brought to life some of the most complex characters in cinema".	Statuette
2026	Floyd Norman	Animator	Mahershala Ali	For "having broken barriers and inspired generations of artists over his remarkable career".	Statuette
2026	Ridley Scott	Director	Matt Damon	For being "a true visionary whose decades-long legacy has left an immeasurable impact on global cinema".	Statuette

== See also ==
- Academy Juvenile Award
- Governors Awards
- Irving G. Thalberg Memorial Award
- Jean Hersholt Humanitarian Award
