= Augarten =

Park in Vienna, Austria

Coordinates: 48.226°N 16.376°E

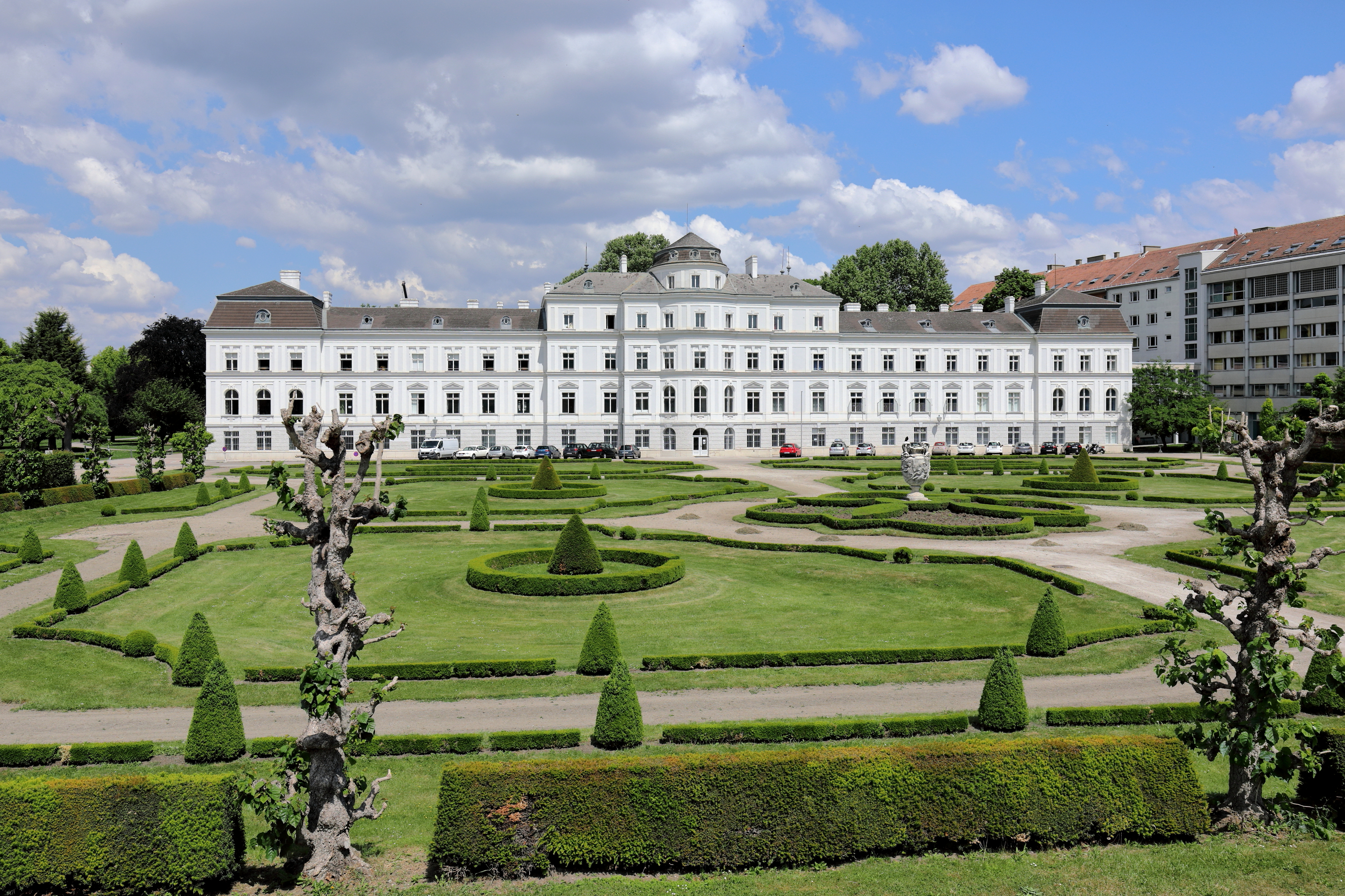
Palais Augarten

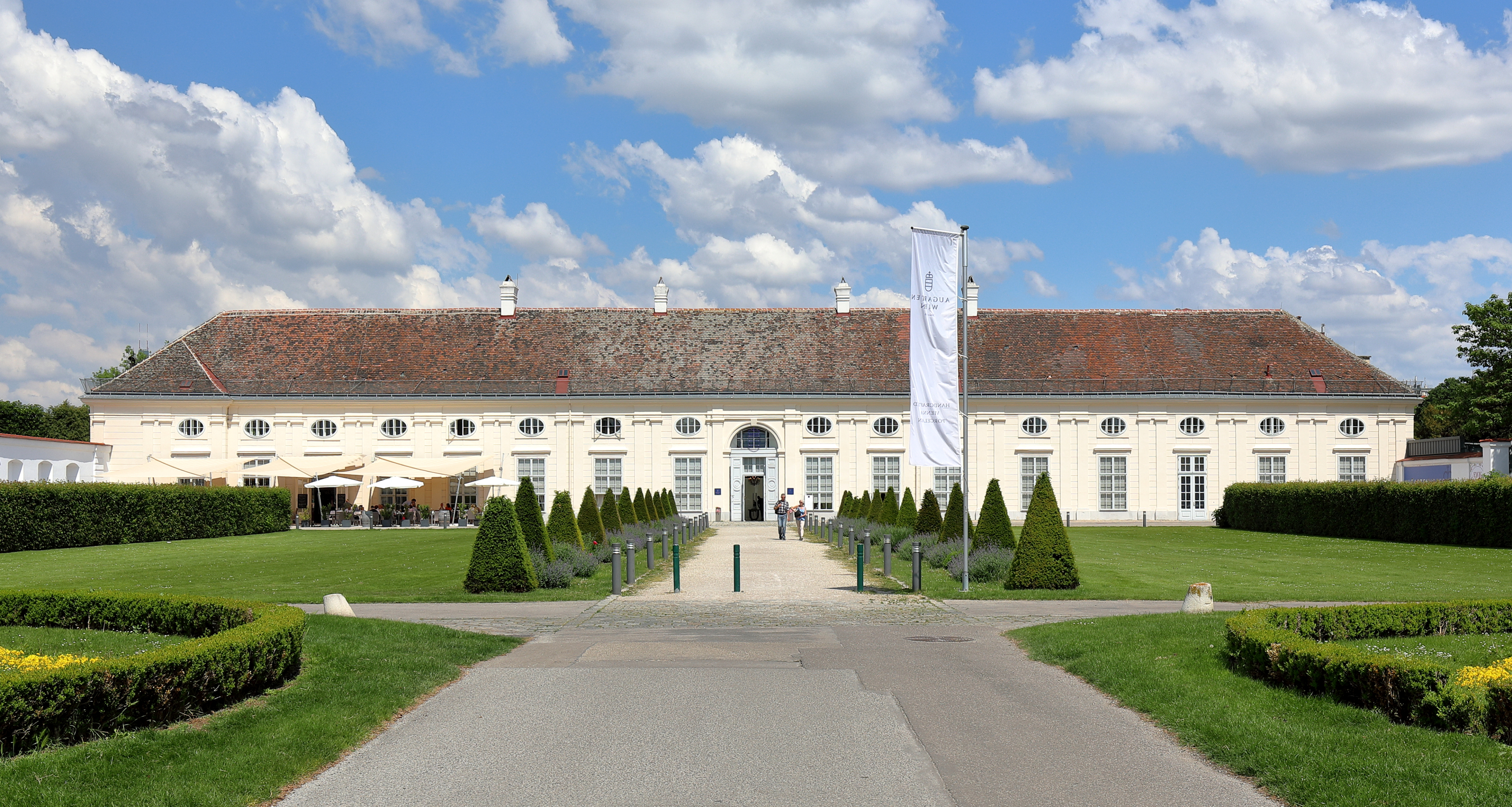
Porcelain Manufactory Augarten

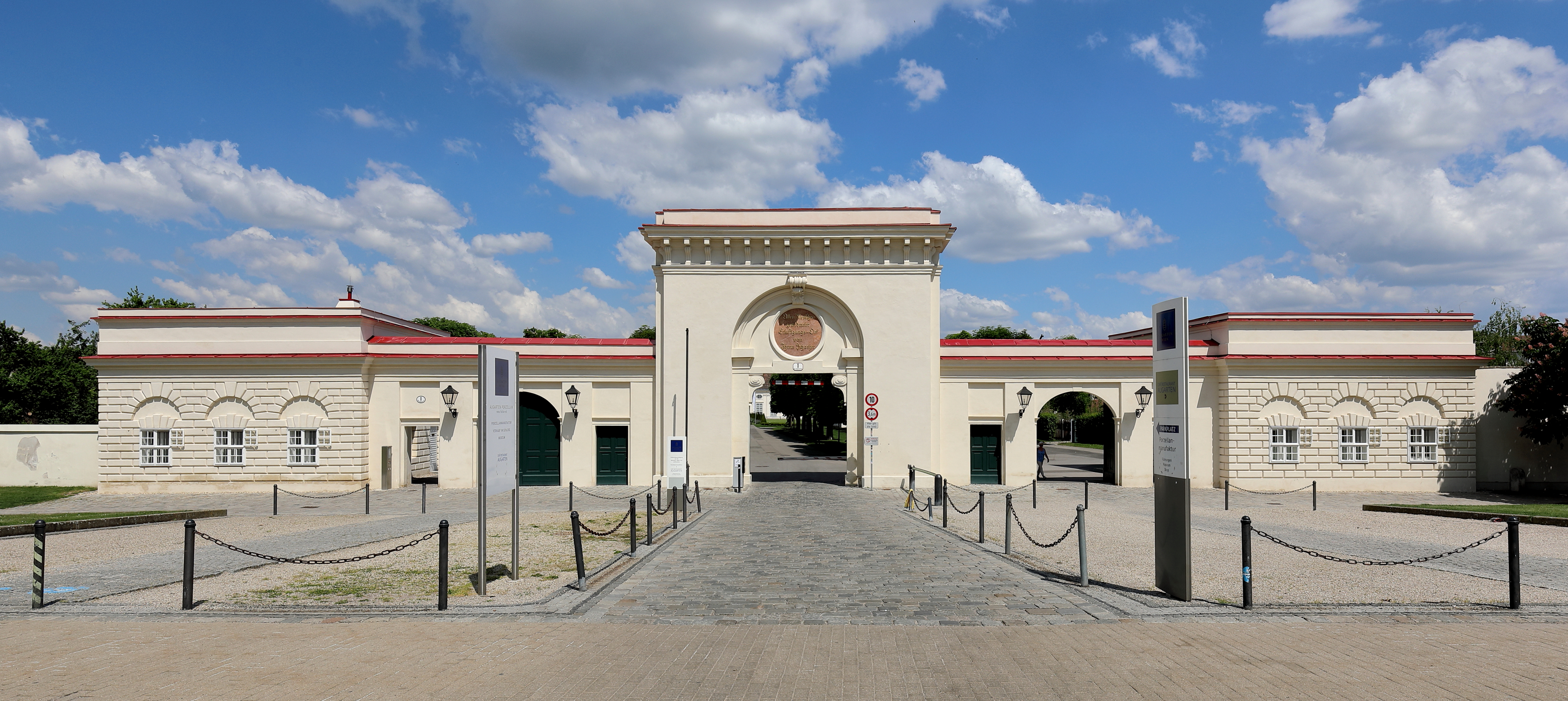
Main portal

Map of the Augarten

The Augarten is a public park of 52.2 hectares (129 acres) situated in the Leopoldstadt, the second district of Vienna, Austria. It contains the city's oldest Baroque park.

In the north-west and north-east it borders (since 1900) on the 20th district, Brigittenau, in the north-east also on the former Nordwestbahnhof, from where the North Western Railway made its way to Bohemia, while to the south it faces the so-called Karmeliterviertel ("Carmelite quarter"), the historical Jewish quarter, followed by the Leopoldstadt. Until 1870 (Vienna Danube regulation), the areas north and east of the Augarten were floodlands mostly uninhabited.

The park is designed in the French Baroque style with elaborate flower gardens and impressive shady avenues of chestnut, lime, ash, and maple. Like most fenced public parks and gardens in Vienna it is open only in the daytime: the park's five gates close at sunset (signalled by a siren).

The Augarten hosts a variety of facilities such as the Wiener Sängerknaben (the Vienna Boys' Choir) in the Palais Augarten, the Augarten Porzellanmanufaktur (Augarten porcelain factory), the Augarten Contemporary (part of the Österreichische Galerie Belvedere, the Austrian Gallery housed in the Belvedere), the Filmarchiv Austria, a retirement home, a Jewish academic campus (called Lauder Chabad Campus), a paddling pool for children and sports fields. Significant testimonials to the Third Reich are two high anti-aircraft bunkers (flak towers).

There are two places in the park where meals or snacks may be had, the Bunkerei (partially housed in a former bunker) and on the premises of the Filmarchiv, and in addition two catering establishments, one of them in the Atelier Augarten.

The Baroque park, the palace and the remaining part of the original park wall, dating from the early 18th century, are since 2000 listed as historic monuments.

== History ==
In 1614, Emperor Matthias had a small hunting lodge built in what was then called the Wolfsau, at the time a flood-plain (Au is an Austrian and southern German term for a riparian forest or flood-plain). Around 1650, Ferdinand III bought up the area around the nearby Tábor (which is a Czech word used here for a fortified checkpoint outside the city's walls) at a branch of the unregulated Danube. He established a formal Dutch garden and expanded the hunting lodge into a small mansion. In the 1660s, Leopold I acquired the adjacent gardens from the noble Trautson family and had it transformed into an all-comprising pleasure park. In 1677 he converted the Trautsons' garden mansion into a small palace (a so-called Lustschloss, a palace for pleasure only), to which he gave the name "Imperial Favorita". Later on instead of this one the name Old Favorita became established, since in today's 4th district a New Favorita (today: Theresianum) had been built.

1683 was a bad year for Vienna and the Augarten: during the course of the Turkish siege the grounds and buildings were destroyed in their entirety, with exception of some parts of the walls. Not until 1705 were the gardens and the palace restored under Emperor Joseph I. The garden palace built at this time is now the headquarters of the Augarten Porzellanmanufaktur (Augarten porcelain factory), the second oldest porcelain factory in Europe. A few years later, in 1712, the new monarch, Charles VI, commissioned landscape architect Jean Trehet - also responsible for the creation of the gardens at Schönbrunn as well as at the Belvedere - to carry out new plans to develop the whole park, in French style. Today's Augarten is still based on this.

After the opening of the Vienna Prater to the public in 1766, the Augarten was likewise opened on 1 May 1775 by Joseph II. On this occasion nightingales were settled and hunting of them was strictly forbidden. The entrance at that time was still guarded by soldiers, whilst inside the park grounds war invalids and other handicapped people maintained order. The inscription Allen Menschen gewidmeter Erlustigungs-Ort von Ihrem Schaetzer ("A place of amusement dedicated to all people by their Cherisher") can still be read at the main gate to the Augarten from Obere Augartenstrasse. To satisfy these high expectations, dining rooms and dance halls, refreshment places and billiard rooms were established and for all of them the restaurateur Ignaz Jahn was responsible as traiteur.

Joseph II in 1781 ordered Isidore Canevale to erect a humble structure for the emperor and used to spend his summers there; it has become known as Josefsstöckl and is still existing today. Today's Heinestrasse linking this building to the Praterstern square has been planted as an alley on the order of the emperor. During the time of the Congress of Vienna the Augarten has been a most popular meeting place of the nobility.

During the disastrous inundation which afflicted Vienna from February 1 to March 1 of 1830, the entire Augarten was flooded to a depth of 1.75 metres (5 ft 9 in). Two memorial plaques, one on the inner side of the main portal and another at the gate to Castellezgasse, commemorate this flood. With the regulation of the Danube from 1860 to 1870, the Augarten became permanently separated from the Danube river. The former riparian forest and plain changed to a cultivated landscape, which was no longer subject to flooding.

After 1918, Augarten became a park administered by the federal government, and this stayed so until today.

Between 1934 and 1936, the dictatorial Federal Chancellor Kurt Schuschnigg lived in the Palais Augarten.

During the Second World War, military authorities chose the Augarten as one of several places to erect massive buildings for anti-aircraft defence (flak towers) to protect the inner city from Allied bombing. During summer 1944 the construction of a 55-metre (180 ft) high tower with platforms for anti-aircraft guns and nearby also a 51-metre (167 ft) high control tower was begun but not finished. Their remains are still visible in the middle of the park. Moreover, during the war hundreds of cubic metres of rubbish were dumped on the site whilst armoured vehicles criss-crossed the garden and - as it is supposed - common graves were dug for hundreds of war victims.

Today with the exception of the virtually indestructible flak towers and the bunker (in which a restaurant is housed) nothing from this dark period remains.

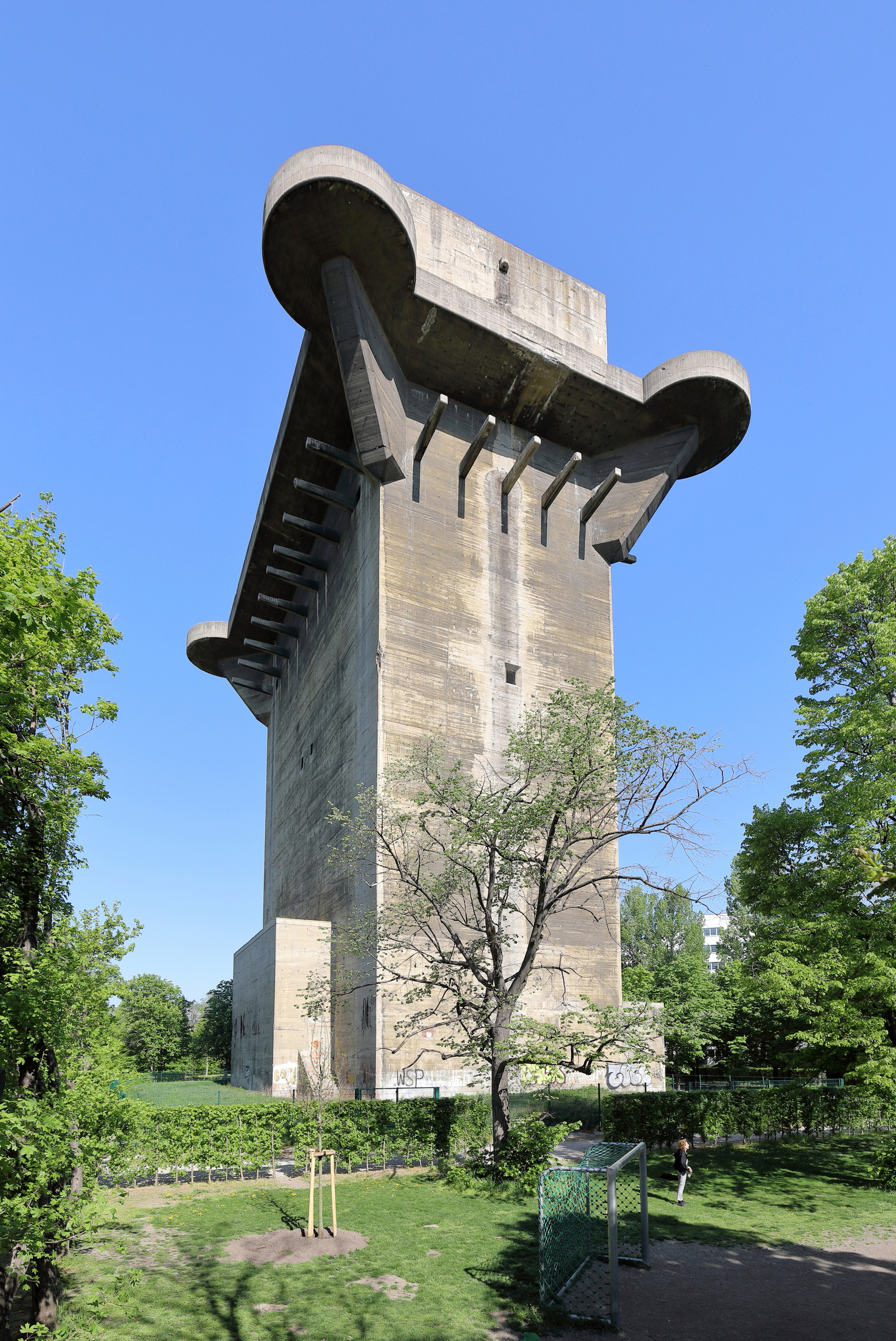
Tower near Rauscherstrasse

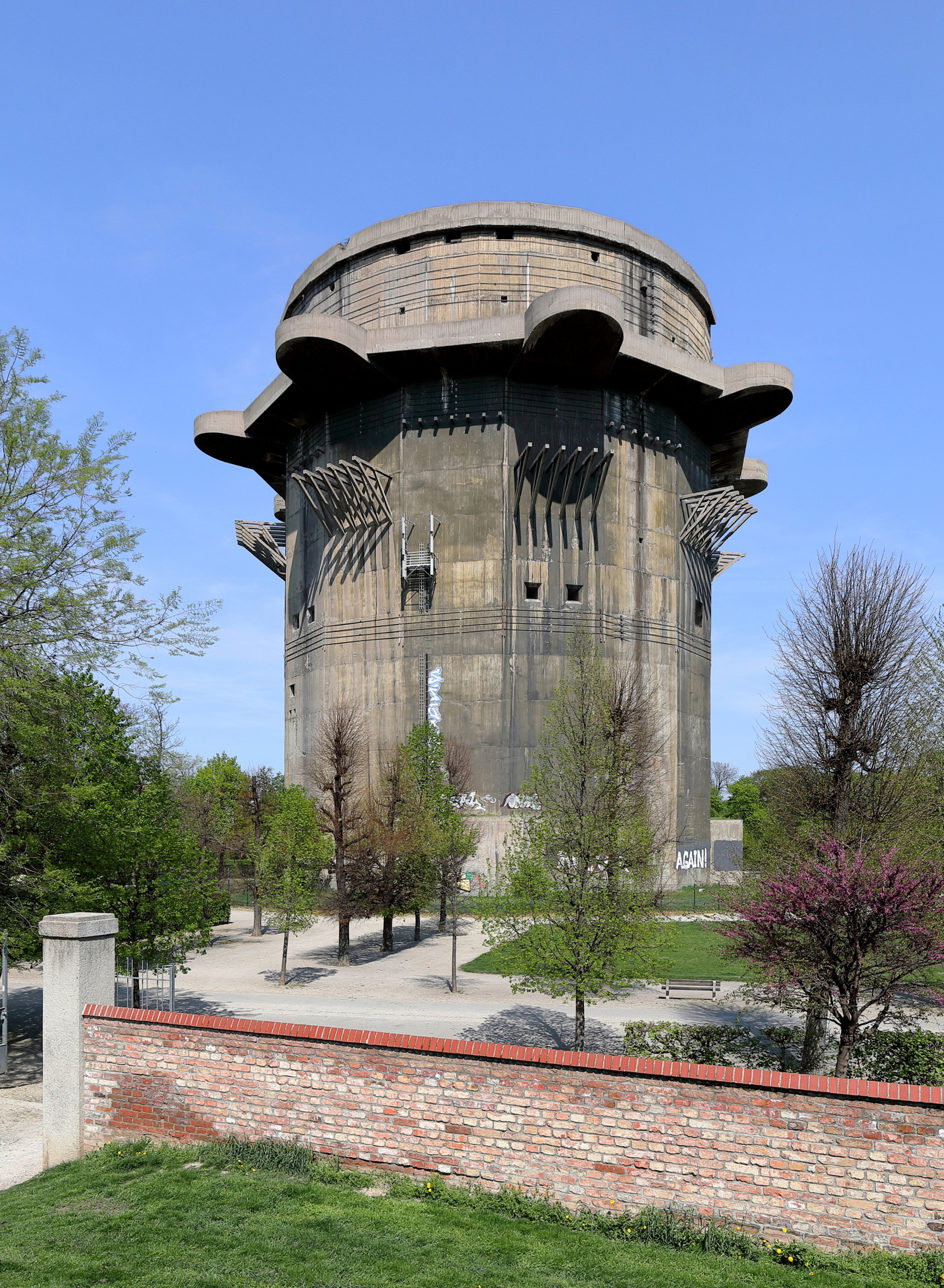
Tower near Obere Augartenstrasse

== Cultural significance ==
As early as 1782, so-called Morgenkonzerte ("morning concerts"), invented by Ignaz Jahn (1744–1810), were conducted or performed by Wolfgang Amadeus Mozart in the Garden Hall of the Palais Augarten; but the house was also used for many other festivals and concerts. The morning concerts were for a time conducted exclusively by Mozart himself, then alternated between different conductors until 1795 when the management of the concerts was transferred to the famous violinist Ignaz Schuppanzigh. Ludwig van Beethoven in 1803 also had several of his works performed under the direction of Schuppanzigh, in 1824 Franz Schubert.

In the years 1820 to 1847, the 1 May concerts also took place in the Garden Hall, where mainly works by Johann Strauss Sr. were presented. In the second half of the 19th century, Augarten became much less popular than before.

From 1998 to 2007, the meadow in front of the flak-tower near Obere Augartenstrasse has been home in July and August to an open-air cinema by the name of Kino Unter den Sternen ("Cinema Beneath the Stars").

== MuTh ==
The 400-seat hall is called MuTh, which stands for Musik und Theater. Its name is also an allusion to the German word Mut ("courage"), which until the end of the 19th century was spelt Muth. On December 14–15, 2012, there was a performance called Kongress über Mut ("Courage Congress").

This last is however a further word-play (on Übermut, thus "congress of arrogance or presumption"), and in fact there was not very much courage needed to set up this building, though citizens' initiatives had been loudly protesting since 2006.

Objectors may call this a scandal, but the building is sure to become the third 'somewhat strange' manmade object in the Augarten, the others being the two battle towers built during the Second World War.

MuTh gallery

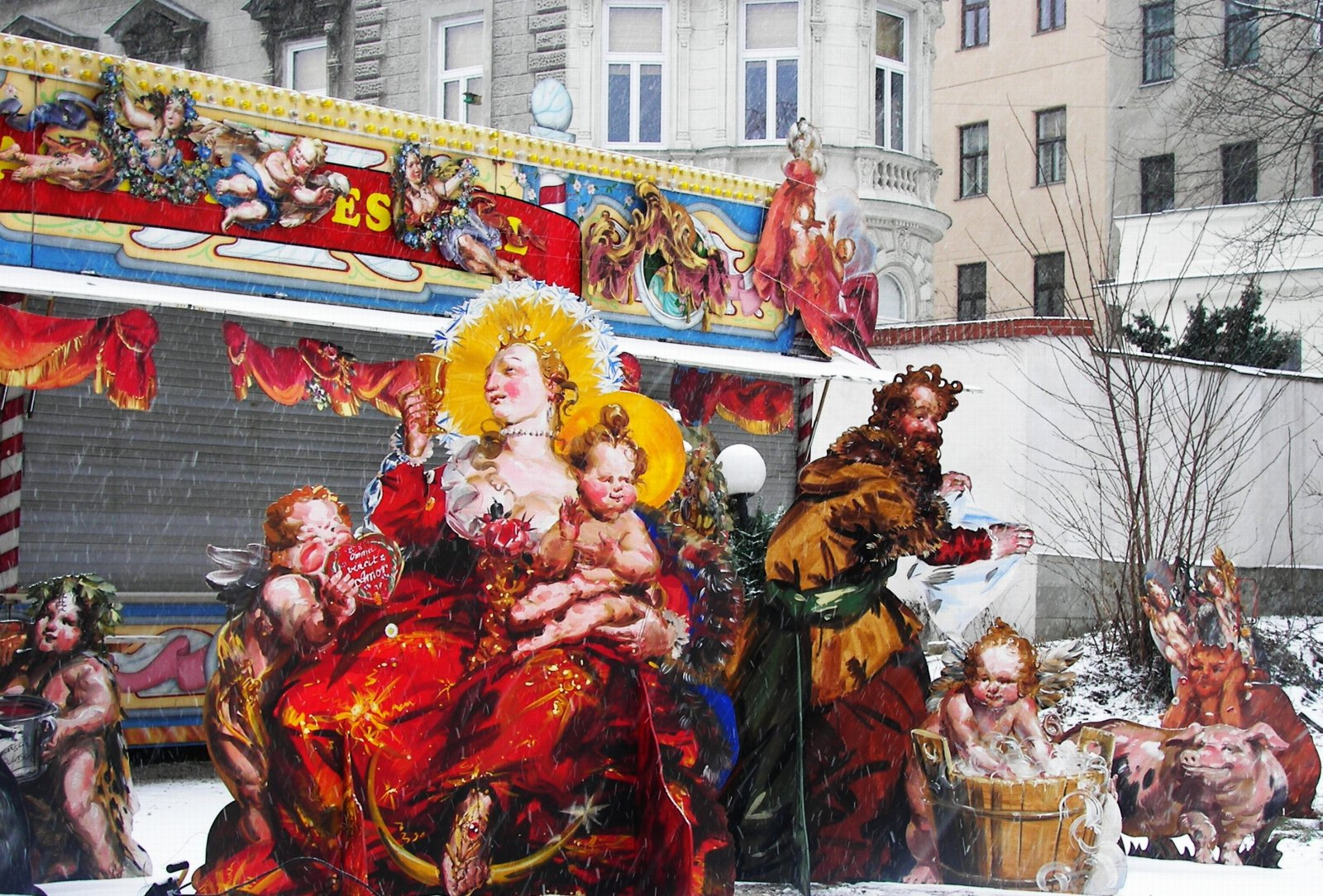
Winter festivity in 2005

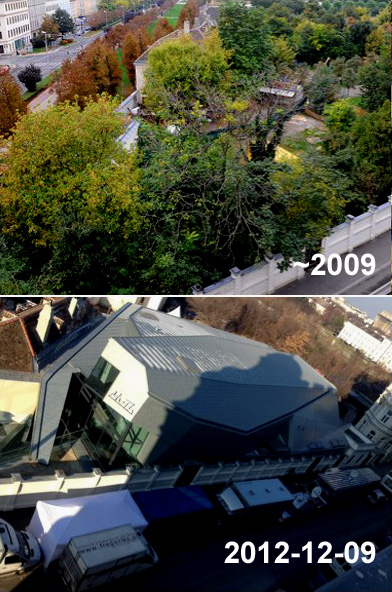
The site in 2009 vs. 2012

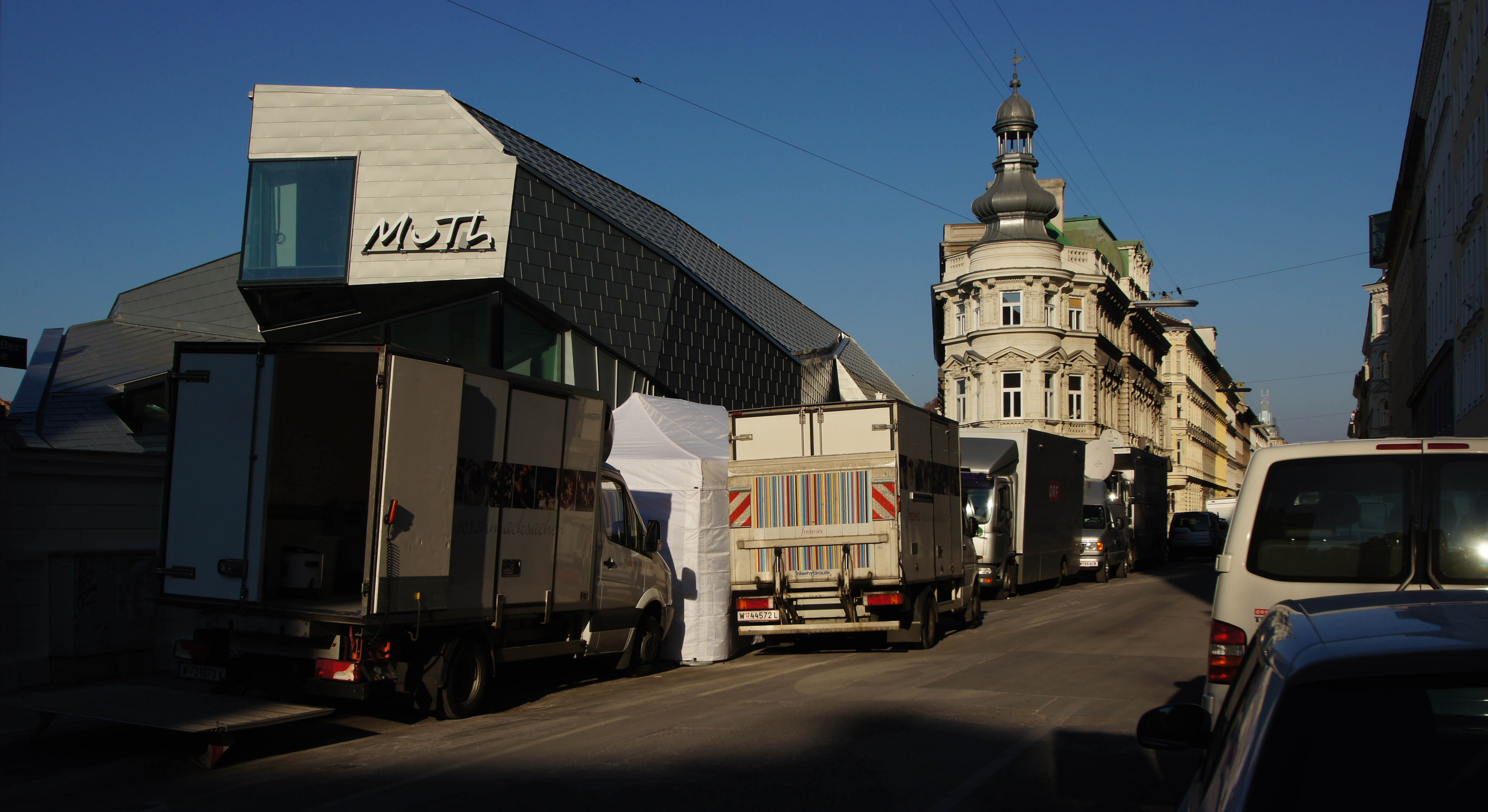
Street view

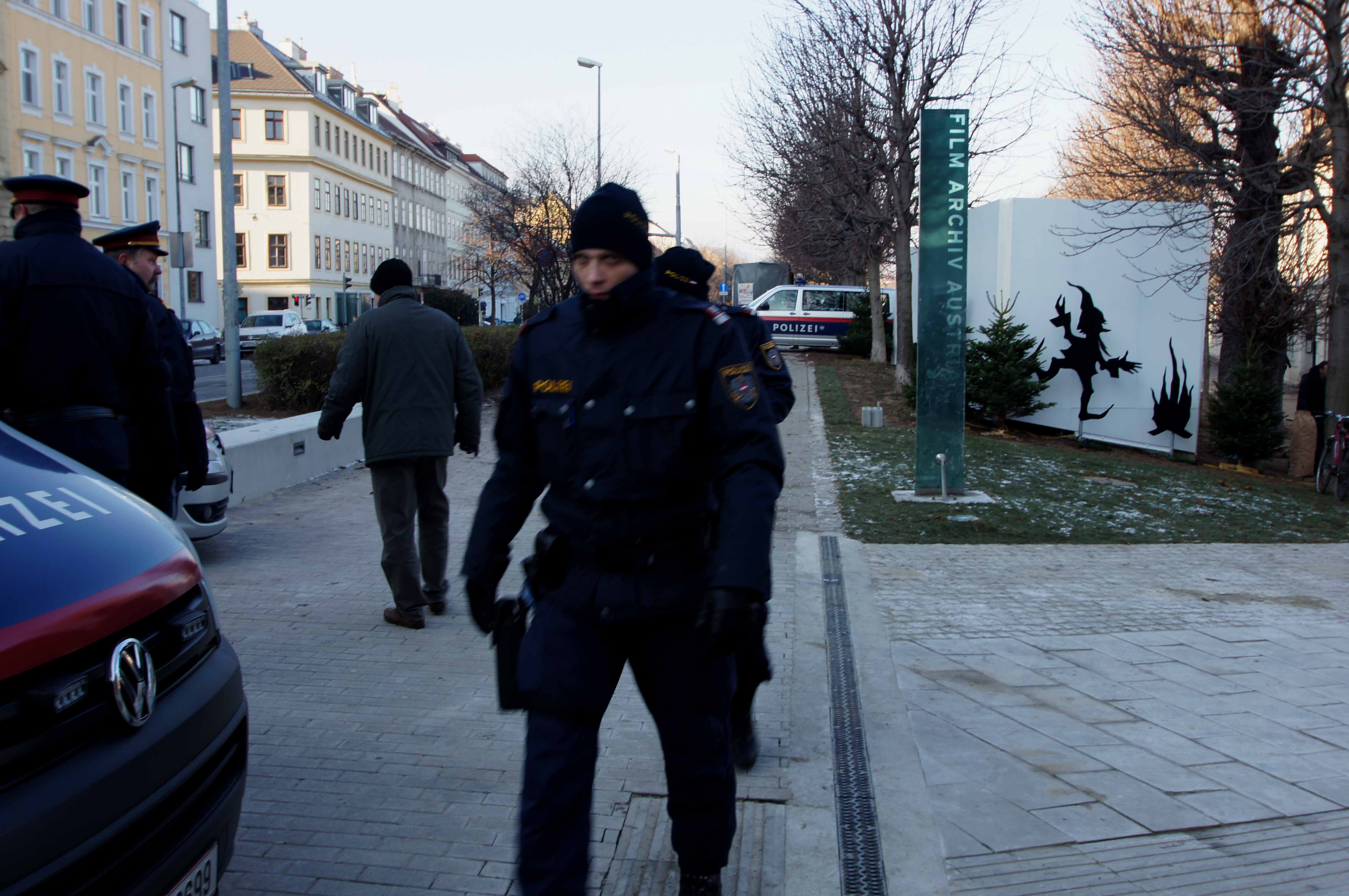
Opening and 'Open Day'

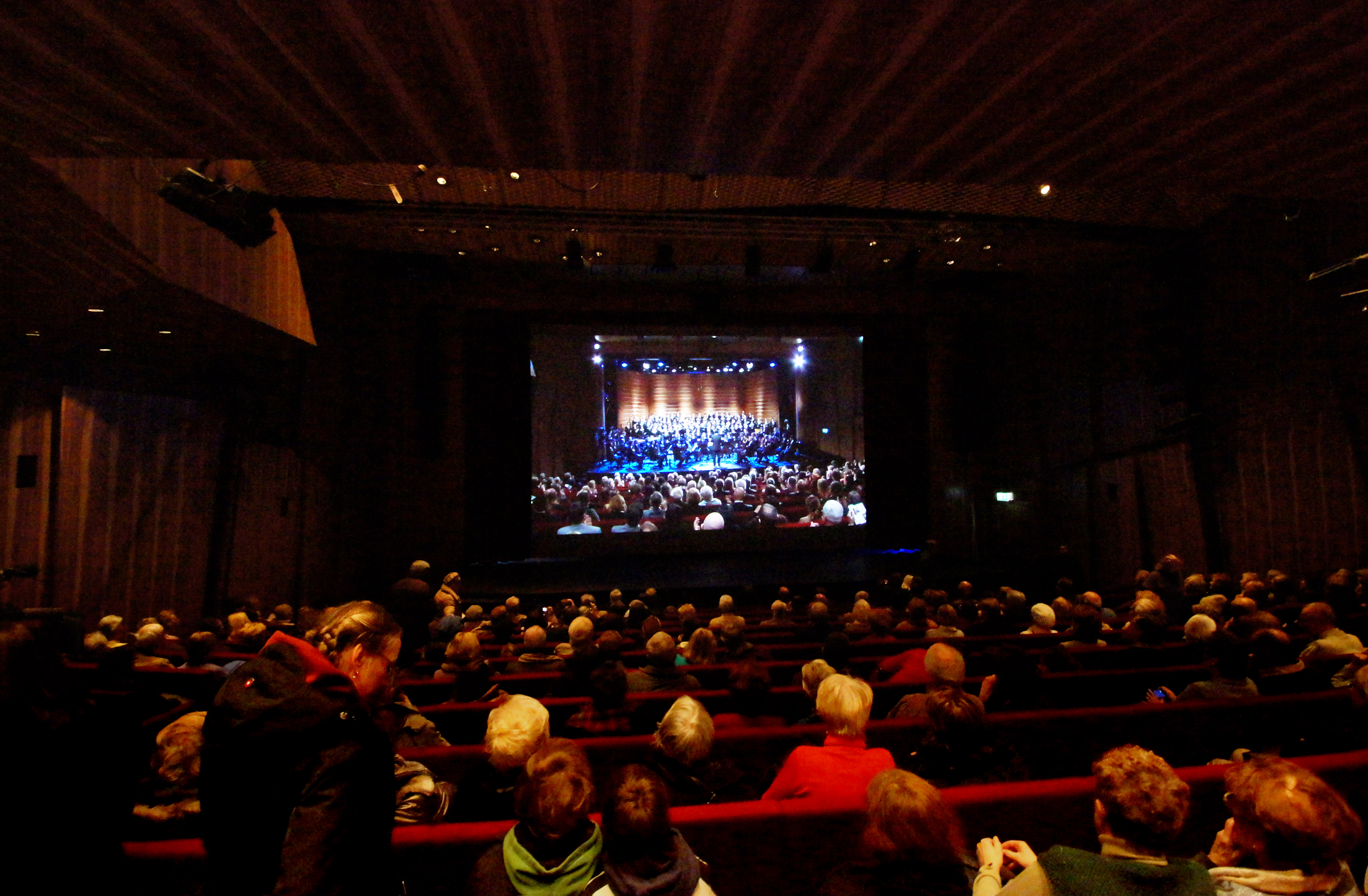
The hall

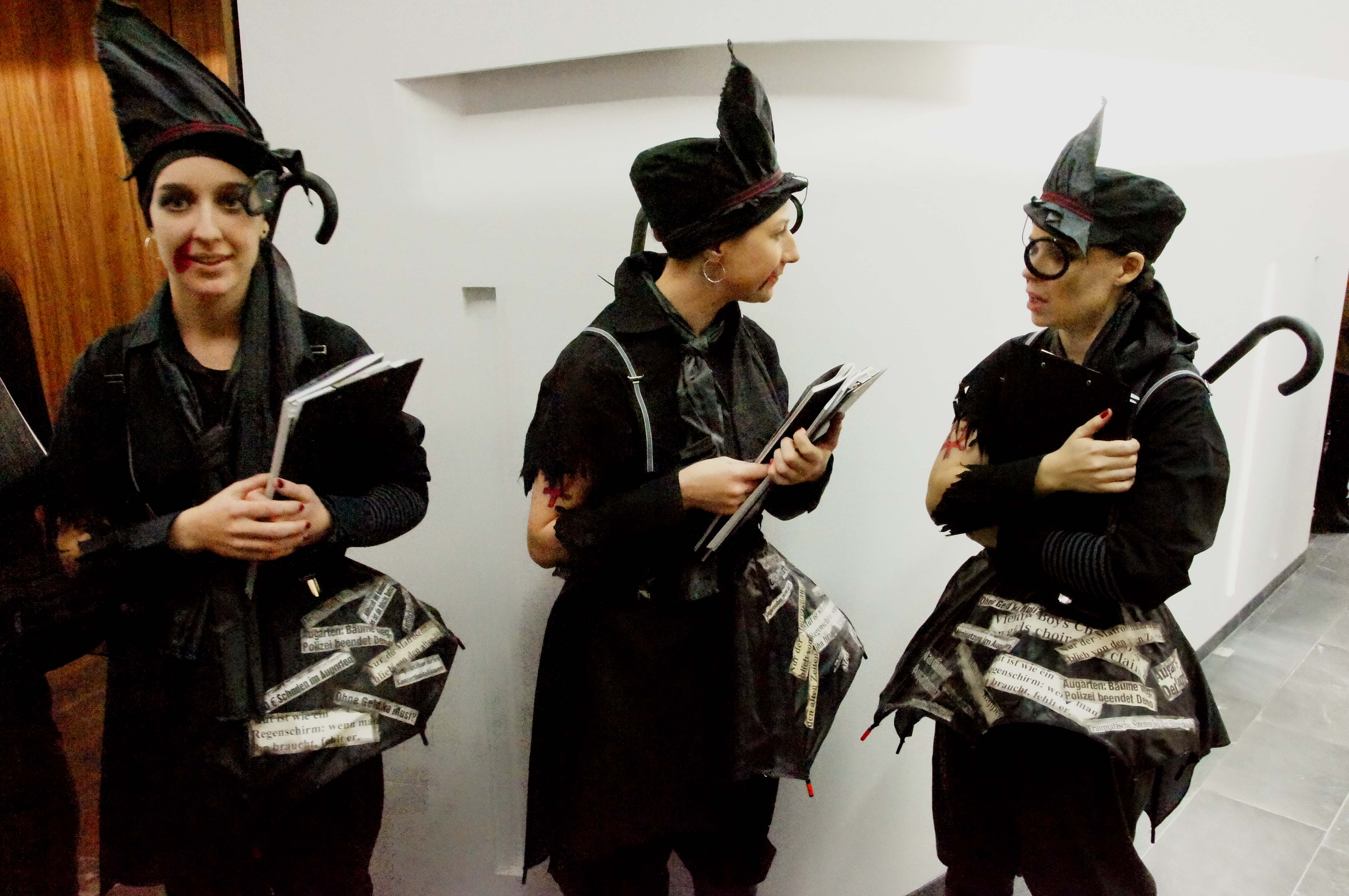
Congress on Courage: three guides

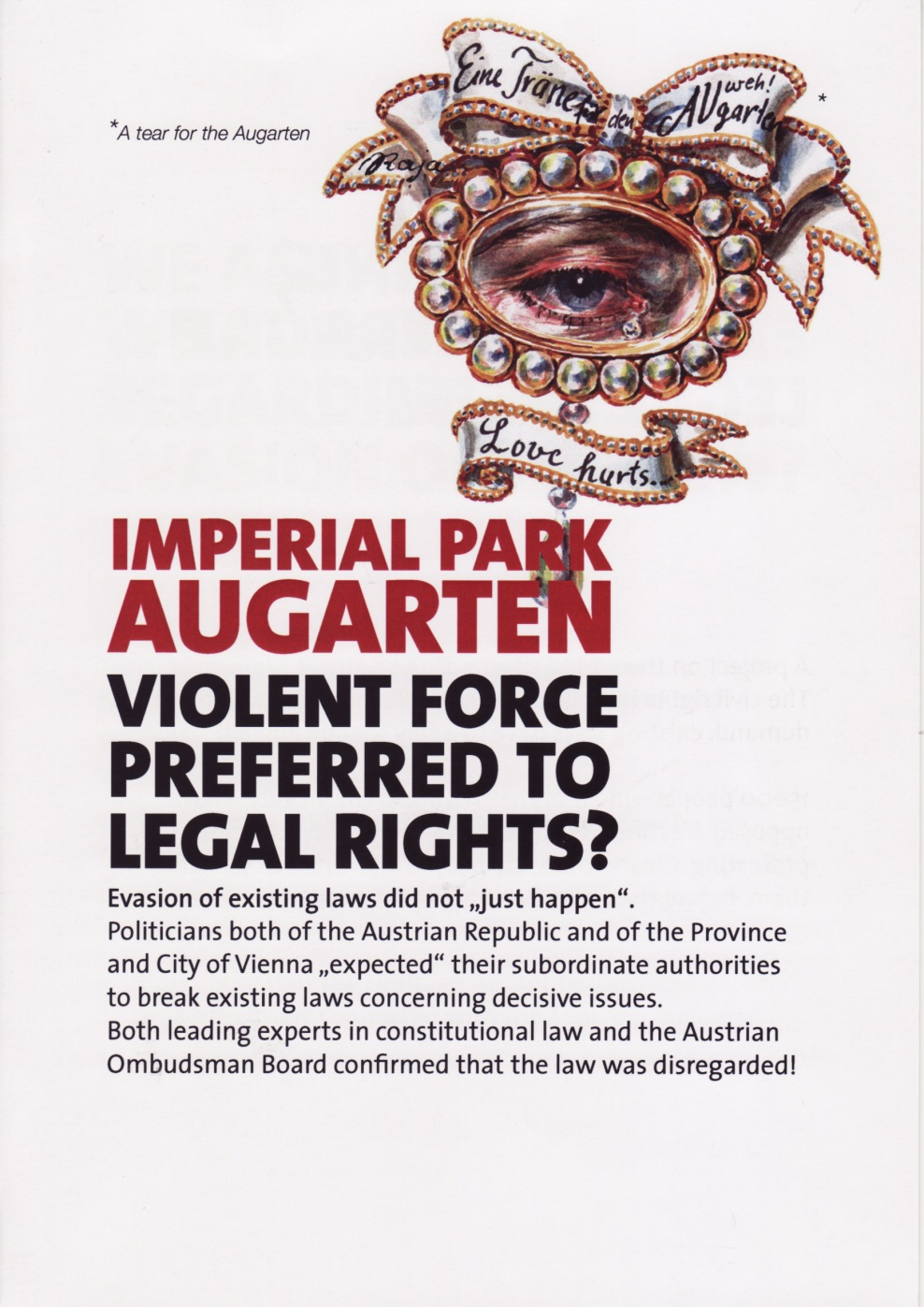
Criticism

== Facilities in the Augarten ==
Since 1948, the Wiener Sängerknaben (Vienna Boys' Choir) have been headquartered at the Palais Augarten. In addition to a boarding school exclusive to the singers there are also a kindergarten and a private elementary school which are open to musically inclined boys and girls. The administration is currently planning to build a concert hall in the Augarten, which was a topic of heated debate until summer 2008 as the new building saw the demolition of the baroque "Gesindehaus" (part of the former servants' quarters) at the corner of the park. After protests, a new design has been created to accommodate the building with the concert hall being moved a few meters away.

The Augarten Porzellanmanufaktur (Augarten Porcelain factory) has its headquarters in the former Garden Hall of the Augarten. The production facility remains here as well. Augarten was the premium brand of Viennese porcelain, nearly as famous as the world-renowned Goldscheider ceramics factory which was managed by the Goldscheider family.

The studio of the artist Gustinus Ambrosi was established in 1995 inside the formal English garden. In addition to a large sculpture garden there is also the Gustinus Ambrosi Museum, dedicated to the artist's work. The former house and studio are known today as the Augarten Contemporary, a branch of the Österreichische Gallerie Belvedere.

Since 1997, the Filmarchiv Austria has been housed in revitalized buildings previously designated as the cooks' quarters, stables, and general side buildings and outhouses.

The Haus Augarten, a senior citizens' home, opened in the grounds of the park in 1975. Directly next to it is the Café Haus Augarten.

The Lauder Chabad campus, constructed in 1998, houses a pre-school, a kindergarten, a primary and middle schools, and a nursery. In addition, the campus has its own teaching academy and a synagogue.

Further features include:

- Gen III Flak and control towers.
- Four sports fields, intensively used particularly by students, especially since many schools do not have their own sports facilities.
- A family swimming pool, which is free to under-15s, and to which adults may only gain access as chaperones or parents (€2).
- A small church, the parish of Mother of God.
- Numerous playgrounds.
- A football cage.
- Several free table tennis tables.
- Two zones for dogs.
- Several reserve gardens for the raising of plants needed for garden design and maintenance.
