= Almost Angels =

1962 film directed by Steve Previn

- Official theatrical poster
- Directed by: Steve Previn
- Written by: Vernon Harris; Robert A. Stemmle
- Produced by: Walt Disney
- Music by: Heinz Schreiter
- Production company: Walt Disney Productions
- Distributed by: Buena Vista Distribution
- Release date: September 26, 1962
- Running time: 93 minutes
- Country: United States
- Language: English

Almost Angels (also known in some foreign markets as Born to Sing) is a 1962 American comedy-drama film about a group of boys in the Vienna Boys' Choir. The film centers around the chorister's recruitment process, the rehearsals and the life in the institution as well. The story also conveys the value of friendship, honesty and loyalty. The child actors were actual members of the Vienna Boys Choir who perform several traditional Austrian songs throughout the motion picture. The filming took place in the Augarten Palais, the surroundings of Vienna and some other places of the beautiful Austrian landscape.

In the United States, the film was released as the second half of a double bill. The first feature on the double bill was the 1962 re-release of Lady and the Tramp.

== Plot ==
Tony Fiala (played by Vincent Winter) is a working-class boy whose greatest desire is to become a member of Vienna's most famous choir. His father, however, wants his son to follow in his own footsteps as an engine driver. Unlike his loving and supportive mother, he sees no future for the boy in music.

His mother takes him to audition for the choir. There, a bunch of boys are auditioning before him. His mother is waiting outside, and she meets another mother who tries to intimidate her by bragging about her own son, only for her son to sing the next notes off-key. She meets an organist who comforts her, and he reveals he is bringing an orphan named Freidel. To the organist's dismay and the amusement of Tony's mother, he sings a playful yodeling song. Afterward, Tony auditions and impresses the director and Herr with a slow German song.

His father is shocked and upset to learn about Tony auditioning, after reading a letter that reveals Tony was accepted. He argues with Tony and his mother, insisting music is not the right path for Tony.

Despite the objections, Tony manages to join the Vienna Boys' Choir. He marvels at the place, and the director assures his father that he will be getting good education at the Vienna Boys' Choir. The director reveals that there will be a month-long probation period to test him, and he will be allowed to stay if he works hard and keeps up with the rest of the boys in both singing and studies. The father insists that he needs to get good study, or he will pull Tony out as well.

Tony struggles with arithmetic, and learns the oboe as well as joining the choir. Tony meets Peter (played by Sean Scully), who is the leading chorister and the most experienced solo voice. When Peter finds out that Tony has a wonderful, clear treble voice, he feels threatened by the talented new boy, especially after Herr tells them they sing well together.

That night, Freidel finds Tony's radio, which he had gotten from his father. Peter notices and takes the radio, insisting it is against the rules. The other choir boys convince him to play the music on the radio, which he does after realizing that only Tony will get in trouble, as an act of sabotage to Tony. Tony tries to get the radio back, but starts a pillow fight to the music instead. All the choir boys throw pillows at each other in fun. Herr comes to turn off the light, but waits a bit after noticing their pillow fight. Eventually, Herr runs out of patience and jiggles the handle to alert the boys he is there, to which everyone runs to their bed to leave Tony caught with the radio, the music still playing.

The next morning, Peter informs Tony that he is wanted in the director's office. A bunch of stuff happens including Peter's voice breaking.

== Cast ==
- Vincent Winter as Tony Fiala
- Sean Scully as Peter Schaefer
- Peter Weck as Max Heller
- Hans Holt as Director Eisinger
- Bruni Löbel as Frau Fiala
- Fritz Eckhardt as Herr Fiala
- Denis Gilmore as Friedel Schmidt
- Hennie Scott as Ferdie
- Gunther Philipp as Radio Announcer
- Hans Christian as Choirmaster
- Hermann Furthmosek as Choirmaster
- Walter Regelsberger as Choirmaster

== Songs and music ==
The film takes advantage of the story itself to present traditional Austrian and German songs performed by the children. Besides the Lieder, there are some international scores and instrumental music:

1. "Kaiser-Walzer" (Emperor Waltz by Johann Strauss Jr.)
2. "Willkommen"
3. "Heidenröslein" (Little Rose of the Heath) by Heinrich Werner / Johann Wolfgang von Goethe
4. Unidentified piece for piano and oboe by Wolfgang Amadeus Mozart
5. "Der Kuckuck"
6. "Wohlan, die Zeit ist kommen" from Ludwig Schubart
7. "Der Lindenbaum" (Am Brunnen vor dem Tore) by Franz Schubert / Wilhelm Müller
8. "Kindersinfonie" (Toy Symphony by Leopold Mozart)
9. "Tra la la, der Post ist da" (The Postman) by Rudolf Löwenstein
10. "Omnes de Saba Venient" (Graduale by Joseph Eybler)
11. "Lustig ist das Zigeunerleben"
12. "Das Hennlein Weiss"
13. "Guten Abend, Gute Nacht" (Good Evening, Good Night) by Johannes Brahms
14. "Greensleeves" (Traditional English Song)
15. "Ländler"
16. "An Der Schönen Blauen Donau" (Blue Danube Waltz by Johann Strauss Jr.)

== Home media ==
The film was released on DVD as part of the Disney Movie Club. In addition, the title was also made available for streaming in the digital format.

== Popular culture ==
Produced and released more than two years before The Sound of Music and six years after Sissi - The Young Empress, Almost Angels uses the same formula of combining a family story, beautiful scenery, beloved music and Austrian local customs and traditions. Although it had limited distribution in theatres, the film aroused the interest in choral institutions and in the Vienna Boys' Choir itself. Almost Angels was telecast broken up into two parts on the Disney anthology television series.
