= Vienna Girls' Choir =

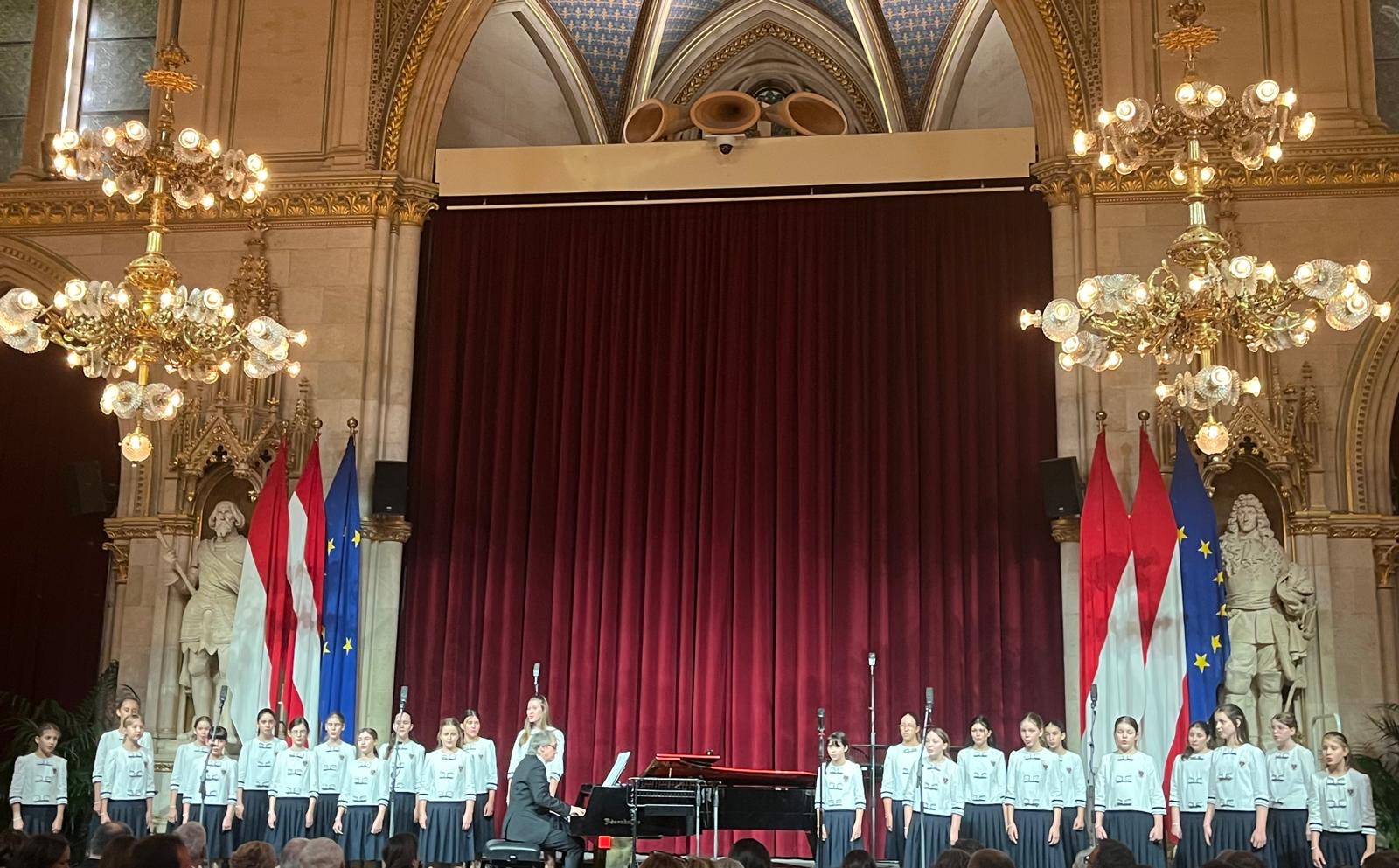
- Concert for Children's Rights

Background information
- Origin: Vienna, Austria
- Genres: Choir Music
- Years active: 2004-
- Members: ca. 25
- Website: wsk.at/chormaedchen

The Vienna Girls' Choir (German: Wiener Chormädchen) is a choir of twenty-five girls between ten and fifteen years. Formed in 2004 in Vienna, Austria, the choir was a part of the Wirth Music Academy under Gerald Wirth, who was the former artistic director of the Vienna Boys' Choir. Currently, the girls receive the same training as the boys and visit the same campus at Augarten Palais, perform independently and are being taught according to the methods of the Vienna Boys' Choir.

The Vienna Girls Choir is conducted by Stefan Foidl, singing a cappella songs, classic music, as well as traditional and contemporary pieces apart from jazz. Other songs from various countries in different languages are also in their repertoire.

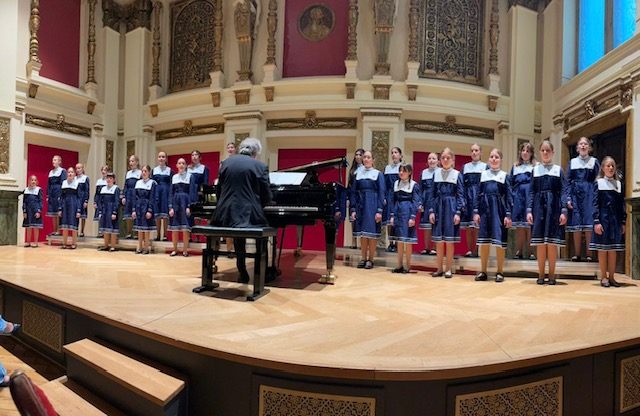
Vienna Girls' Choir

The Vienna Girls' Choir tours in central Europe. In February 2007, the girls traveled to India to perform with a children's choir from New Delhi. Followed by various concerts in concerts halls in Austria and abroad. In Vienna they perform at Musikverein, Concerthaus, Vienna City Hall, Muth Music Hall, and other locations as requested.

In Autumn 2023, the Vienna Girls' Choir received the Austrian Music Theatre Prize, and in June 2024, they were awarded the European Culture Prize together with the Vienna Boys' Choir.

In 2025, Austria, Slovenia, Switzerland, Germany, and Italy are on the itinerary; a tour of China is planned for 2026.

Recently the Vienna Girls's choir joined the roster of Opus 3 Artists, a leading company managing the careers and touring activities of many of the world's greatest performing artists and ensembles.

In August 2026: The girls' choir will open the renowned Grafenegg Festival with Carl Orff's monumental "Carmina Burana."

From September 2026, the girls' choir will become a permanent member of the Vienna Court Music Chapel. In December 2026 – Christmas in Vienna: The girls' choir will be the featured ensemble at the traditional and glittering Christmas concert in the Vienna Konzerthaus.

January 1, 2027 – Vienna Philharmonic New Year's Concert: While the girls performed together with the Vienna Boys' Choir at the 2023 New Year's Concert, in 2027 they will sing for the first time as an independent, all-female ensemble at the Musikverein. This concert will be conducted by Maestro Tugan Sokhiev.
