= Stefan Dakon =

Austrian artist

Stefan Dakon (1904–1992) was an Austrian artist who worked in close association with Josef Lorenzl, producing many exciting bronze figurine sculptures of the Art Deco period. Dakon's models were used among others by members of the association of bronze producers "Wiener Bronzen" ("Vienna Bronze"), as well as by the famous ceramics manufacturer Goldscheider from Vienna. He also designed models for the Austrian ceramics manufacturer Keramos.

== Bibliography ==
1. Victor Arwas. «Art deco» — London: 1992 [1]
2. Victor Arwas. «Art Deco Sculpture: Chryselephantine Statuettes of the Twenties and Thirties» — London: 1975 [2]
3. Bryan Catley. «Art Deco and other Figures» — Woodbridge, Suffolk: 1978 [3]
4. Robert E. Dechant; F. Goldscheider. «Goldscheider. History of the Company and Catalogue of Works» — Arnoldsche, Stuttgart/New York, 2007 [4]

== Further info ==
1. Biography and many models of Stephan Dakon for Goldscheider - http://goldscheider.de/biographien/Goldscheider-Buch-Dakon.html
1. Dakon Art Deco Goldscheider figure of actress Louise Brooks - 20th Century Decorative Arts
