= Susi Singer =

Austrian-American ceramic artist

- Susi Selma Singer-Schinnerl
- Born: October 26, 1894; Vienna, Austria
- Died: 1955 (age 61); California, United States
- Education: Wiener Werkstätte
- Known for: Ceramics
- Movement: Modernism

Susi Singer (October 26, 1894 – 1955), also known as Selma Singer-Schinnerl, was an Austrian-American Jewish ceramic artist known for her bright and detailed figurines.

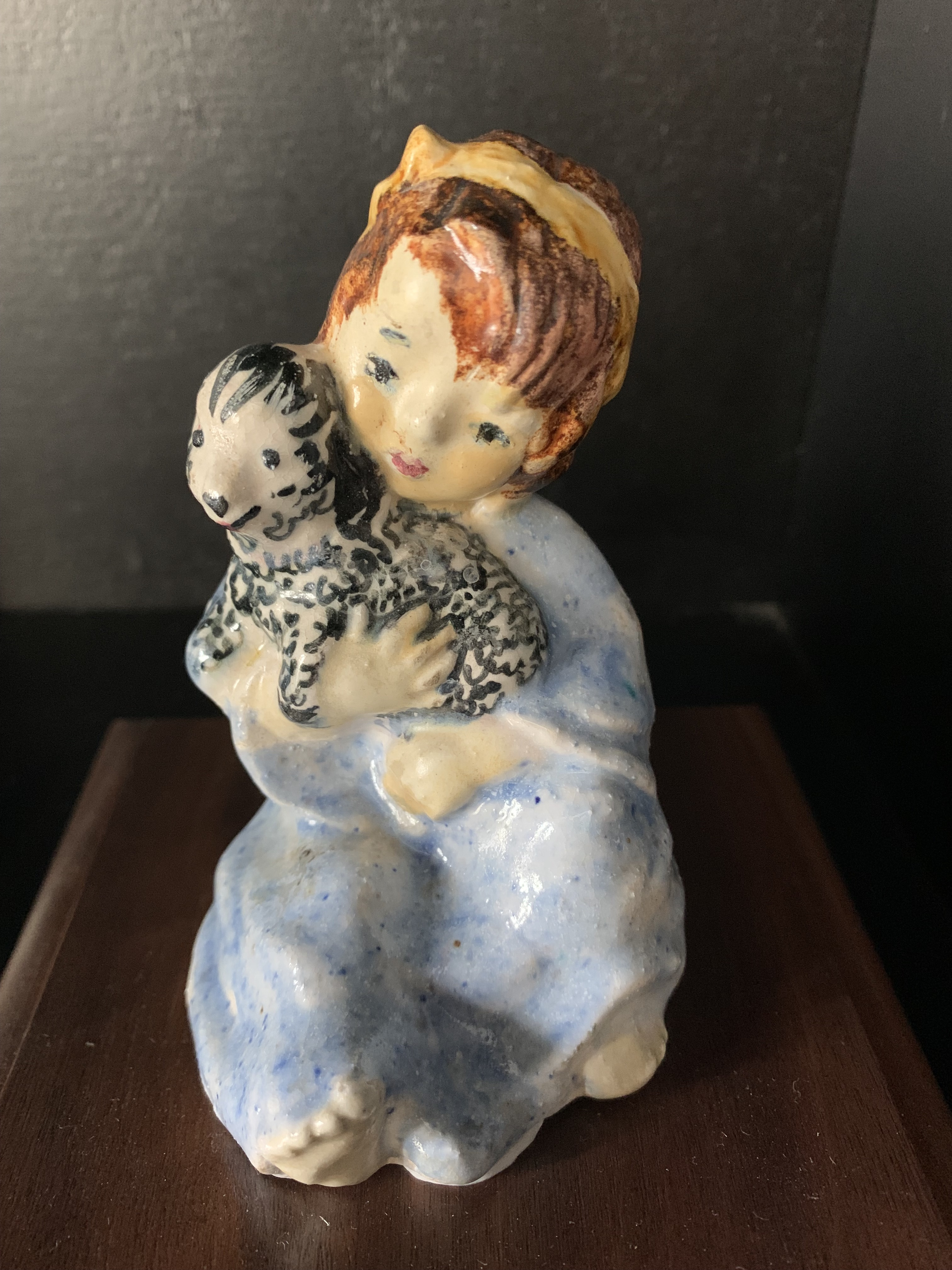
Ceramic piece by Susi Singer Schinnerl

Singer became known for her ceramics when studying at the Wiener Werkstätte in Austria. Forced to flee from Europe during the rise of World War II, Singer relocated to California, where she worked as a teacher and artist until her death in 1955. Today, Singer is known for her modernist and decorative figurines, and for her prominence in bringing Austrian influences into American ceramics.

== Early life and education ==
Susi Singer was born Selma Rosa Singer in Vienna, Austria on October 26, 1894. Singer's childhood was fraught with the social and political tensions of that era, and she was partially disabled by a bone disease that had been exacerbated by malnutrition during and after World War I. However, Singer exhibited natural artistic talent from a young age, and she received a scholarship to study at the acclaimed Wiener Werkstätte by the time she was seventeen. As a Viennese design community, the Wiener Werkstätte rejected mass production and favored a style of Modernism. Its founder, Joseph Hofmann, encouraged Singer to pursue the "applied art" of ceramics rather than her original ambition of becoming a painter. This may have been due to her gender, as applied arts were considered to be more acceptable for women compared to the "fine art" of painting. However, it also may have been caused by the workshop's new leadership and an economic downturn in the 1920s, which led to a greater production of ceramics as a replacement for other, more expensive mediums.

Singer continued to pursue her artistic education while studying and producing ceramics at the Wiener Werkstätte. However, her early career was hindered by traditional Austrian gender roles, which stigmatized women entering the workforce. This sexism was perpetuated in the male-dominated art world, where female artists were often forced to develop skills through private instruction rather than within a formal academic setting. Most Viennese art institutions refused admission to women until 1920, and those that did permit female students often had a low quality of artistic instruction. Singer and contemporaries like Vally Wieselthier (1895–1977) and Tina Blau were thus limited in their educational opportunities and often followed similar educational arcs.

Singer attended at least two institutions that permitted admission to female students before 1920. She is referenced as studying at the Kunstgewerbeschule Vienna School of Arts and Crafts, which would later become the University of Applied Arts Vienna. However, although women were permitted to attend introductory courses in "applied arts" at the public art school, they were restricted from more advanced classes in "fine arts" like painting and architecture. Singer also studied at the Viennese Kunstschule für Frauen und Mädchen, or the Art School for Women and Girls, along with contemporaries Tina Blau, Adolf Böhm, and Otto Friedmann. Established in 1897, the school had no gendered admission restrictions and maintained a high level of art education. However, the school officially closed its doors to Jewish artists in 1938, after Nazi ideology spread through Vienna. It later became known as the "Wiener Frauen Akademie," or Vienna Women's Academy.

Singer's Jewish heritage may have aided her in pursuing her artistic career. Many Viennese female artists that emerged during this time came from assimilated Jewish families who emphasized education, using social and personal connections to obtain admission into art institutions.

== Career ==
=== Early career ===
Singer's work at the Wiener Werkstätte shaped her career in ceramics. Although Singer's first individual success came in 1922, when her sculptures were published in the journal "Deutsche Kunst und Dekoration" (German Art and Decoration), it was her work for the Wiener Werkstätte that brought her international attention. Singer's pieces were exhibited through the workshop at the 1925 Exposition Internationale des Artes Décoratifs et Industriels Modernes in Paris, alongside other artists like Valerie (Vally) Wieselthier (1895–1977). Although the artwork presented by the Wiener Werkstätte was criticized for folksy, baroque decorations that were too "feminine" for modernist ceramics, the exhibition was highly influential within American ceramic circles. Singer thus began gaining American contacts for her artwork. Her notoriety grew after the 1928 International Ceramics Show in the United States.

Singer drew inspiration from her surroundings, and her ceramics reflected the attitudes and culture of her location during their creation. Her early work for the Wiener Werkstätte adheres to the workshop's "identification of design as a vital means of domestic recovery, cultural reform, and even moral regeneration." Despite being relegated to the applied art of ceramics, Singer strove to give her figurines a sculptural, whimsical quality. She rejected traditional, smooth porcelain in favor shaping sculptures from rough clay, decorating them with bright, layered glazes. She did not try to create functional objects, but crafted nostalgic or fanciful characters that belied the political and social unrest she was experiencing.

In 1924, Singer married coal miner Josef Schinnerl and moved to Grünbach, a rural town in the mountains of Austria. There, she established her own studio, the ceramics workshop Grünbach am Schneeberg, while simultaneously continuing to produce art for the Wiener Werkstätte. A 1938 lifestyle magazine describes the artist and her work:

"The sculpturess lives quietly high up in the Austrian mountains, removed from all except her husband, a worker in the coal mines, and her five-months old baby, named Peterl. Aided only by her appreciative spouse, who has sometimes found it necessary to carry her to her studio in order to save her strength, she works entirely alone, producing her delicate lyricisms for American friends who can obtain them through the Amymay Studios in Pasadena, California."

During this time, Singer's work extolled the virtues of rural life. She based her figurines on local townspeople and incorporated more humor into her pieces, creating refreshing ceramics with fantastic subject matter and bright color.

=== Immigration to the United States ===
Heightened political tensions and anti-semitism began to roll through Austria prior to the country's annexation by Nazi Germany in 1938. Singer, now in her forties, was initially removed from these anxieties because of her remote location and marriage to an Aryan man. However, her situation changed after her husband died after a mining accident, leaving her alone with her young son, Peter. Peter was 11 months old at the time of his father's death. Singer's physical conditions and her son's needs caused her to move back to Vienna to stay with her mother (born Josefine Singer, nickname Pepi) and sister (Frederika Singer). As anti-semitism and pre-war sentiment rose, Singer applied for a visa to the United States, showing the American consulate sales slips from American galleries to prove that she could be self-supporting of herself and her son. Her visa was approved, and she immigrated to California in 1937, just before World War II truly began within Austria.

Singer settled in Los Angeles in 1937, teaching classes and workshops while showing her work locally. There, she met Millard Sheets, an American artist who recommended her for grants while introducing her to the local art community. A memoir by an unrelated artist paints a picture of Singer's early life in Los Angeles:

"From the age of six to 12 my sculpture teacher was Susi Singer, a Jewish ceramic artist who'd escaped from Nazi Vienna in 1938 with no money or family except her infant son, and letters of introduction to American artists. Millard Sheets introduced her to my mother. Mother helped Singer survive in Los Angeles until her classes and commissions provided enough income for her to survive on her own... she was a master of ceramic techniques that no one else around knew anywhere near as well"

In California, Singer's ceramic style shifted towards more realistic, simplified figurines. Her work reflected more themes from Hollywood, including modern women, beachgoers, and Chinese figures. Despite her evolving approach, Singer continued to include the bright, whimsical details she had become known for. In a newspaper interview, she stated: "I do not have to chop all their charm away to avoid undercuts... I put 30 colors on if I want, and it shimmers, and the form undulates." Her work at this time especially is argued to have brought modernist Austrian influences into American ceramics, encouraging a more playful and colorful approach to sculpture.

=== Late career ===
Singer's friendship with Sheets, who was the director of the Scripps College's Arts Department from 1938 to 1954, allowed her to participate in a larger ceramics community. Located in Claremont, California, Scripps was a leader in ceramics during the 1940s and 1950s. In 1946, Singer received a grant from the college's Fine Arts Foundation for glaze work, which required that Singer produce multiple glaze sculptures for their art department. Her work was also exhibited in the 1947 Scripps Bi-Annual Exhibition, and its six succeeding exhibitions. Her sculptures were therefore shown alongside famous potters like Laura Andreson, Henry Varnum Poor (designer), Otto Natzler, and Gertrud Natzler.

Singer also taught ceramics courses at Scripps during the 1940s, but had declining health. The artist, who had been carried by her husband to an Austrian studio in her youth, struggled with the three flights of stairs required to enter her ceramics classroom. The malnutrition of her childhood, combined with bone disease, led to her being reliant on a wheelchair by the end of the 1940s.

Figural sculptures began to fade from popular ceramics at this time, and Singer struggled to maintain her authenticity and style while earning a livable income. She briefly created mold-made figures for a commercial firm, but ultimately returned to individual sculpture because the reproducibility of the work "diminished the spirit of her characters." In 1949, she created a small number of figurines representing refugees. This contrasted heavily with her previous work, which had avoided anxious themes in favor of elegant, whimsical pieces with a surreal serenity.

In 1952, Singer participated in the Ninth Annual Ceramic Exhibition at Scripps College. The exhibition, themed "6000 Years of Art in Clay," ran with a catalogue written by Los Angeles Times art critic Arthur H. Miller. Miller had previously described Singer's work as "miracles of imagination, observation, grace, humor, freedom and amazing craftsmanship" during a 1948 review.

Singer's date of death is January 24, 1955. She died in Los Angeles, California.

== Artwork and legacy ==
Singer's ceramics are known for their bright glazes and fantastic, refreshing qualities. Her content matter ranged from mythology to humor. The nostalgic undertones and deep serenity of Singer's work are often noted as contrasting with her challenging personal history and physical condition. Singer's pieces were usually signed with a mark of her full name, or her initials "SS" painted onto the bottom.

Singer is often compared to Vally Wieselthier, a fellow Jewish Austrian ceramicist. The two artists attended the same educational institutions, and Weselthier's work for the Wiener Werkstätte was presented at the 1925 Paris exhibition in conjunction with Singer's work. Both women were forced to flee to the United States during World War II, and are often credited with bringing Austrian modernism to the American ceramics movement. However, although Singer's early work could be argued to coincide with Wieselthier's ceramics style, her later pieces are markedly different.

== Posthumous exhibitions ==
In 2005, an exhibition called "Women's 'Werk:' The Dignity of Craft" ran at the American Museum of Ceramic Art. The exhibition contrasted Singer's work with Marguerite Wildenhain, a Jewish ceramic artist who had also settled in California after escaping Nazi Germany.

Singer was also featured in The Better Half: Jewish Women Artists Before 1938, an exhibition that ran from November 4, 2016, to May 1, 2017, in the Jewish Museum Vienna. The exhibition aimed to present forty-four Jewish female artists whose careers were hindered by sexism or interrupted by the Holocaust, and cited Singer as one of the most well-known artists of this time and genre.
