= Friedrich Goldscheider =

Bohemia-born Austrian entrepreneur, manufacturer (1845–1897)

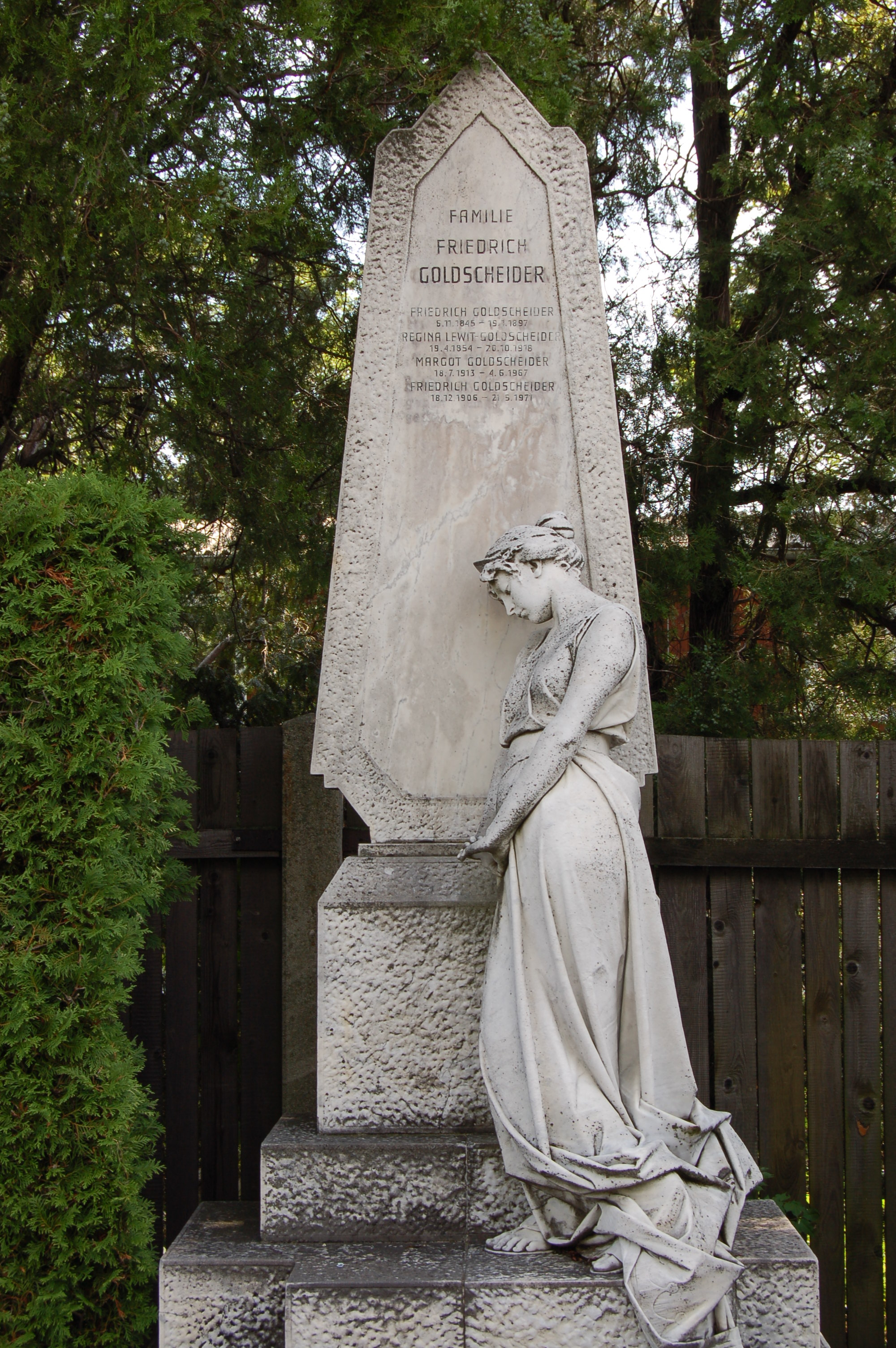
- Goldscheider grave stone at Döbling Cemetery in Vienna, Austria
- Born: 6 November 1845; Plzeň, Bohemia, Austrian Empire
- Died: 19 January 1897 (aged 51); Nice, France
- Occupations: Entrepreneur, manufacturer of ceramics and bronze
- Known for: Decorative objects made by Goldscheider ceramics
- Spouse: Regina Lewit
- Website: goldscheider.de

Friedrich Goldscheider (6 November 1845 – 19 January 1897) was a Bohemia-born Austrian entrepreneur and manufacturer of ceramics and bronze. His business was Goldscheider ceramics (Goldscheider Keramik; formerly Goldscheider Porcelain Manufactory and Majolica Factory, German: Goldscheider'sche Porzellan-Manufactur und Majolica-Fabrik). He specialized in porcelain, terracotta, faience, and bronze.

== Biography ==
Friedrich Goldscheider was born 6 November 1845, in Plzeň, Bohemia (now the Czech Republic). His father Moritz owned a haberdashery business in Plzeň, where he apprenticed in his youth. He later years he worked at a brickwork for the creation of fireproofing material.

In 1873, Goldscheider moved to Vienna after his marriage to Regina Lewit. In 1877, he started working in the porcelain industry in Vienna, and by 1885, he opened his ceramics factory. The business was successful and multiple locations were opened including a factory in Plzeň, and a painting studio in Karlsbad, Bohemia (now Karlovy Vary). Many of the works produced by his company were Orientalist, with depictions of Middle Eastern themes.

Goldscheider died on 19 January 1897 in Nice, France. After Friedrich Goldscheider death in 1897, his widow Regina and his brother Alois managed the business, and his sons Walter and Marcel managed the manufacturing and factories.

Friedrich Goldscheider's son, Arthur Goldscheider was an art publisher of sculptures in Paris during the Art Deco-era.
