= Goldscheider ceramics =

Austrian ceramic manufactory

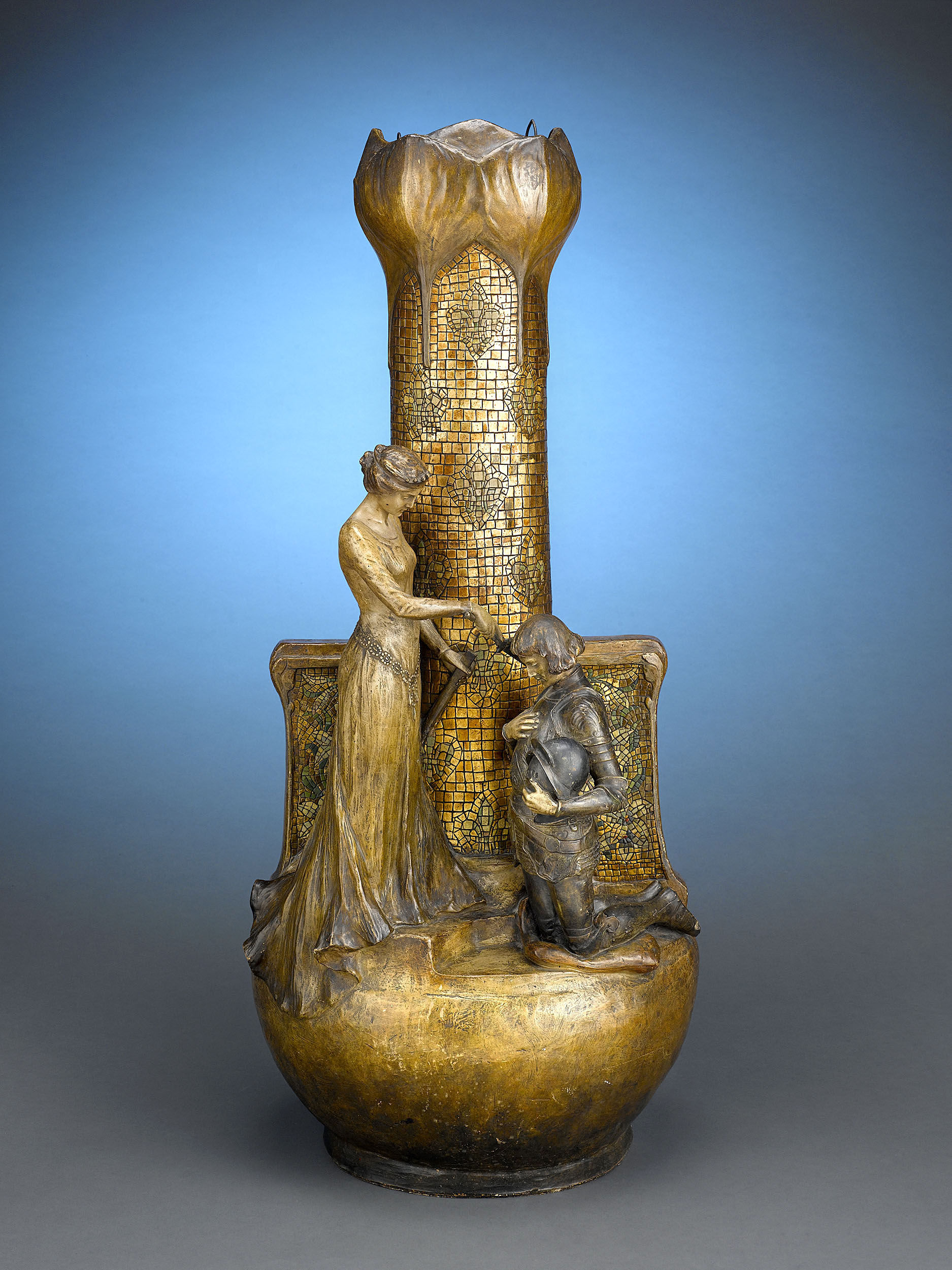
Joan of Arc Cane Stand by Goldscheider, circa 1897/1914.

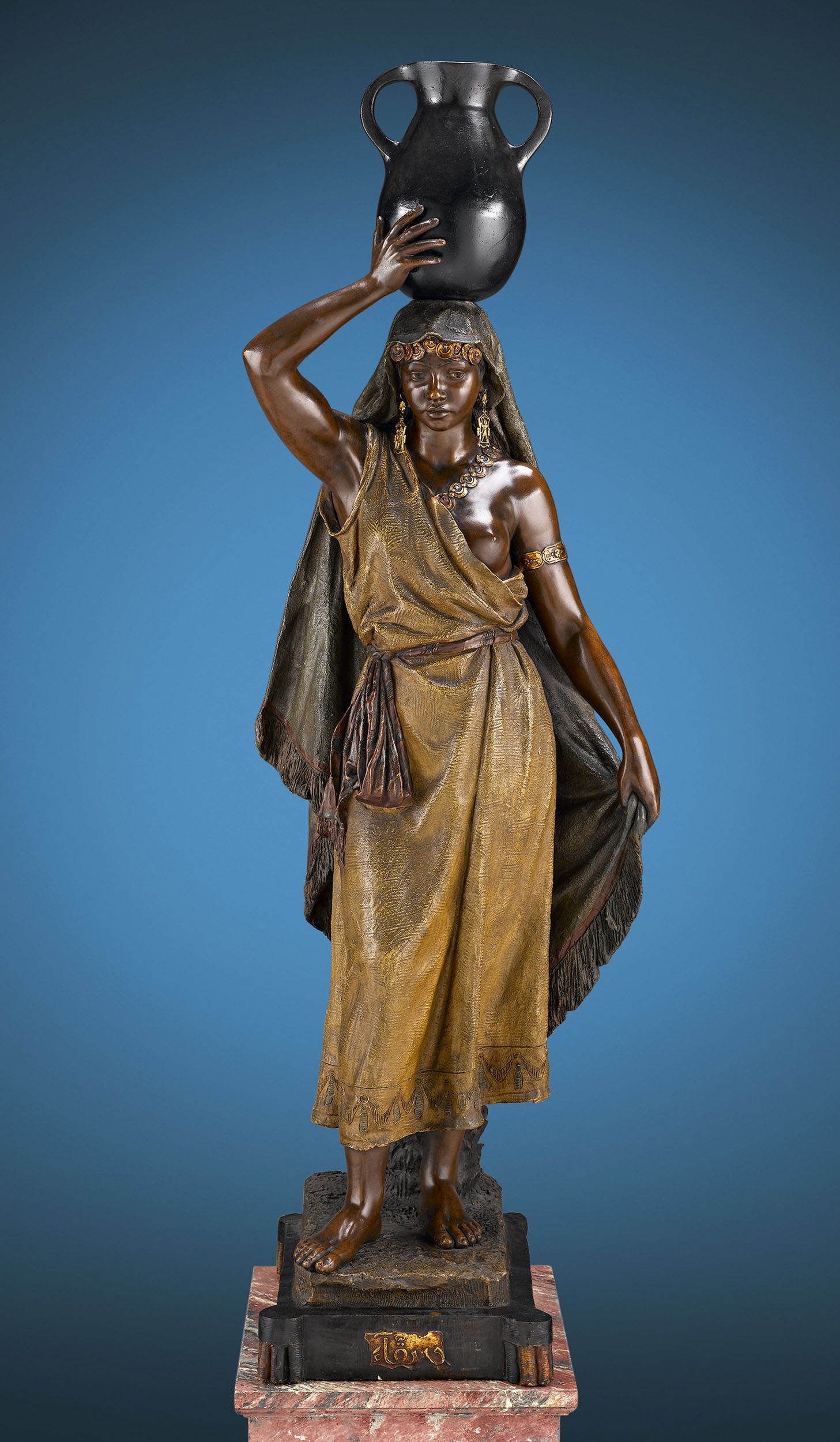
Sakka-ha, Terracotta Figure by Goldscheider, circa 1895.

Goldscheider Porcelain Manufactory and Majolica Factory (German: Goldscheider'sche Porzellan-Manufactur und Majolica-Fabrik; later: Goldscheider Keramik) was an Austrian ceramic manufactory, which specialized in porcelain, terracotta, faience, and bronze decorative objects.

== History ==
In 1873, Friedrich Goldscheider came from the Bohemian city of Plzeň to Vienna, and in 1885 he founded the Goldscheider Porcelain Manufactory and Majolica Factory. It became one of the most influential ceramic manufactories of terracotta, faience and bronze objects in Austria, with subsidiaries in Plzeň, Paris, Leipzig and Florence. For over half a century, Goldscheider created masterpieces of historical revivalism, Art Nouveau (Jugendstil) and Art Deco.

Famous artists such as Josef Lorenzl, Stefan Dakon, Ida Meisinger and the two perhaps best known Austrian ceramic artists, Michael Powolny and Vally Wieselthier, worked for Goldscheider. Several of the artists who worked for Goldscheider also worked for other Viennese studios, such as Augarten, Keramos or for the German brands Rosenthal and Meissen.

After Friedrich Goldscheider's death in 1897, his widow Regina Lewit–Goldscheider, and his brother Alois Goldscheider managed the business, and his sons Walter Goldscheider and Marcel Goldscheider managed the factories.

Escaping the Holocaust, the Goldscheider family migrated in 1938 to the United Kingdom and the United States of America. Walter Goldscheider started a new factory in Trenton, New Jersey, and he returned to Vienna in 1950. Marcel Goldscheider went to Stoke-on-Trent and produced figurative ceramics for Myott, and he opened his own studio in the 1950s in Hanley. Both brothers died in the early 1960s.

More than 10,000 different models were created over a period of three generations. Since the very beginning, many of these won first prizes and gold medals at world fairs, exhibitions and trade fairs. Goldscheider figures are nowadays very much sought after by collectors worldwide and reach prices up to 45,836 USD at auctions such as Sotheby's, Christie's, Dorotheum and on eBay.

The son of Friedrich Goldscheider, Arthur Goldscheider was an art publisher of sculptures in Paris during the Art Deco-era.

== Recent exhibitions ==
Several exhibitions and lectures took place since the new book on Goldscheider was presented in 2007 to the public: a big Goldscheider exhibition was shown at the Vienna Museum (November 2007 – February 2008), at the LBI in New York (January–April 2009), as well as lectures in Prague at the Museum of Decorative Arts (June 2008) and at the 10th Worldwide Art Deco Congress in Montreal (May 2009).

From June to October 2015, the Grassi Museum in Leipzig honoured the history of Goldscheider with an exhibition. Current exhibitions are usually shown at the official Goldscheider website.

== Bibliography ==
- Gerald Koenecke, Goldscheider – West Germany. Figuren und Wandmasken 1953-60. Göttingen, 2000 Edition Ruprecht, ISBN 978-3-89744-122-4
- Robert E. Dechant and Filipp Goldscheider, "GOLDSCHEIDER. History of the Company and Catalogue of Works". (Firmengeschichte und Werkverzeichnis), 640 pages, 23 x 31 cm, over 2,300 illustrations, 500 in colour, approx. 1,600 models and 163 signatures reproduced. Hardcover with dust jacket. Text in English and German. Stuttgart, 2008 Arnoldsche ISBN 978-3-89790-216-9
- Exotik/Verführung/Glamour. Die Weltmarke Goldscheider. Grassi Museum für Angewandte Kunst, Leipzig 2015, 63 pages, mainly illustrated
