= Hans Gillesberger =

Austrian choir director (1909–1986)

Hans Gillesberger (29 November 1909 – 4 March 1986) was an Austrian choir director. He directed the Vienna Boys' Choir from 1942 to 1945, then becoming deputy director for the Vienna State Opera. He also taught at the University of Music and Performing Arts, Vienna. He returned to the Vienna Boys' Choir as artistic director in 1965. He has been called "one of the most important choral conductors of the postwar period".
