= Vally Wieselthier =

Austrian-American ceramic artist

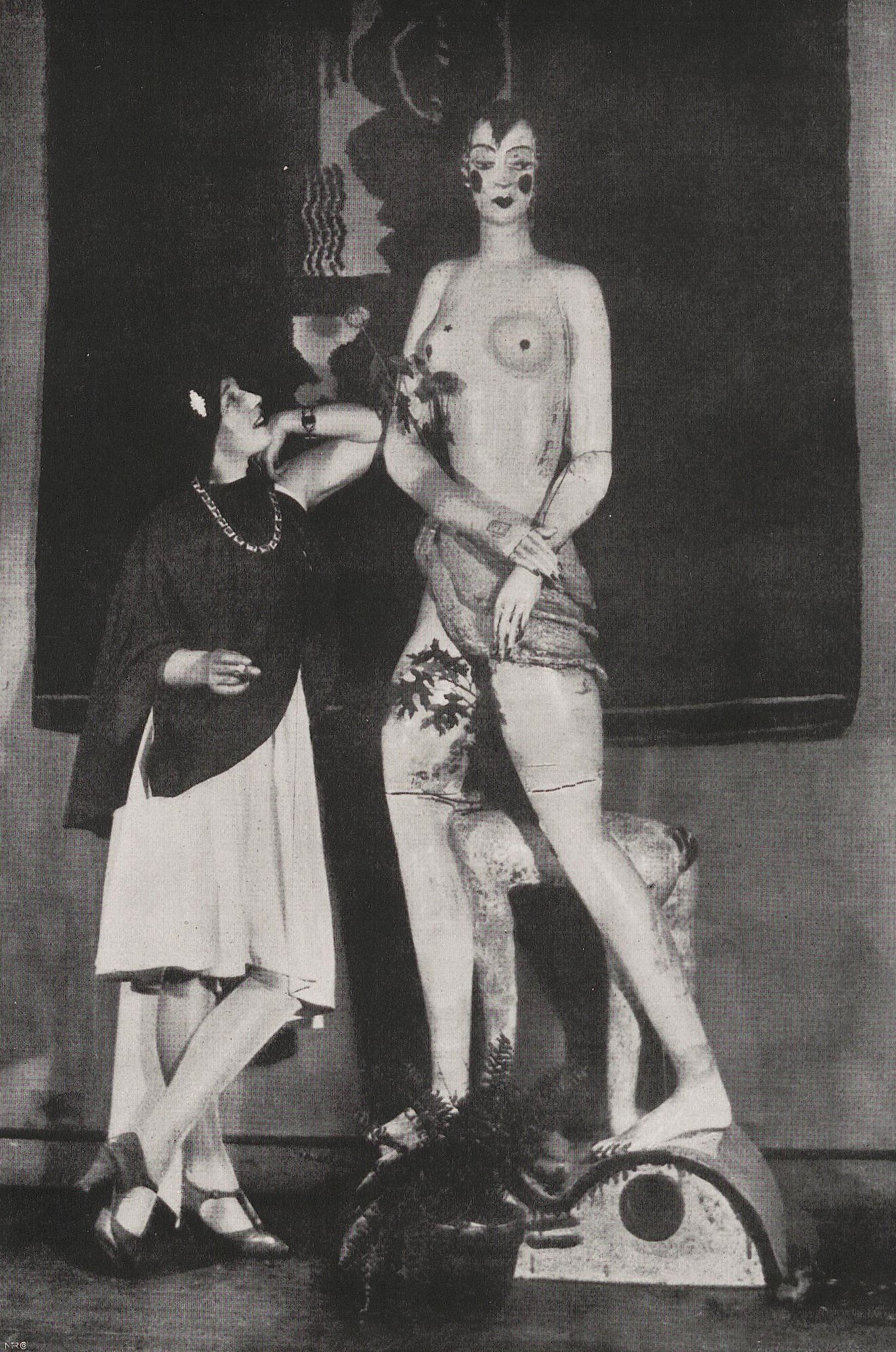
Vally Wieselthier with one of her pieces, New York City, 1928/1929

Valerie "Vally" Wieselthier (May 25, 1895 – September 1, 1945) was an Austrian-American ceramic artist.

== Biography ==
Valerie Wieselthier was born to a Jewish family in Vienna, Austria. Her father, Wilhelm Wieselthier, was a lawyer.

She attended the Wiener Frauenakademie in Vienna from 1912 to 1914 and studied at the Vienna School of Applied Arts with Rosalinda Rothhansl, Koloman Moser, Josef Hoffmann, and Michael Powolny from 1914 to 1920. In addition, she worked as an auxiliary nurse during the First World War. From 1917 to 1922, she worked for the Wiener Werkstätte. From 1922 to 1927, she ran her own ceramic workshop in cooperation with the Augarten porcelain factory, which was newly founded in 1923, but also with other companies such as Friedrich Goldscheider, Gmundner Keramik and J. & L. Lobmeyr.

Wieselthier's expressive and humorous porcelain figures attracted attention at the Exposition Internationale des Arts Décoratifs et industriels modern in Paris in 1925 and are considered typical examples of the Art Deco style. From 1928, the artist increasingly moved her center of life to the United States. She went to the International Exhibition of Ceramic Art in New York City in October 1928. In 1933, she moved to Chicago with Paul Lester Wiener and worked as a designer for the Contempora Group, the Sebring Pottery Company, and General Ceramics. Her use of lead glazes and the potential effect of lead poisoning on her mental and physical health have not been evaluated.

She died on September 1, 1945, of stomach cancer in a New York hospital.

Her work is held by many museums, including The Metropolitan Museum of Art, New York; The Augarten Porcelain Manufactory & the Augarten Porcelain Museum, Vienna; the Fashion Institute of Technology, New York (FIT); The Wolfsonian–Florida International University, Miami; the Minneapolis Institute of Art (MIA), Minnesota; the Cooper Hewitt, Smithsonian Design Museum, New York, and the Museum of Applied Arts (MAK), Vienna.

== Literature ==
- Marianne Hörmann: Vally Wieselthier. 1895–1945. Wien – Paris – New York. Keramik – Skulptur – Design der zwanziger und dreißiger Jahre. Böhlau, Wien 1999 ISBN 3-205-99132-X (Zugleich: Universität Innsbruck, Dissertation, 1999)
- Hertha Kratzer: Die großen Österreicherinnen. 90 außergewöhnliche Frauen im Porträt. Ueberreuter, Wien 2001 ISBN 3-8000-3815-3
- Robert E. Dechant, Filipp Goldscheider: Goldscheider. Firmengeschichte und Werkverzeichnis. Historismus, Jugendstil, Art Déco, 1950er Jahre- Arnold, Stuttgart 2007, ISBN 978-3-89790-216-9.
- Alastair Duncan: Encyclopedia of Art Deco. William Collins, Sydney 1988, ISBN 0-7322-0013-X, S. 183.

== Selected Exhibitions ==
Vally Wieselthier: Ceramic Sculptor, Vienna: Museum of Applied Art (MAK), curated by Rainald Franz and Anne-Katrin Rossberg, April 29, 2026 - January 1, 2027

Vally Wieselthier: Sculpting Modernism, New York: Austrian Cultural Forum New York, curated by Stephanie Buhmann, October 15, 2025 - February 9, 2026
