= Time Lock =

- Directed by: Gerald Thomas
- Written by: Peter Rogers
- Based on: Time Lock play by Arthur Hailey
- Produced by: Peter Rogers
- Starring: Robert Beatty; Lee Patterson; Betty McDowall; Alan Gifford; Vincent Winter
- Cinematography: Peter Hennessy
- Edited by: John Trumper
- Distributed by: Distributors Corporation of America (US)
- Release date: 1957
- Running time: 73 min.
- Country: United Kingdom
- Language: English
- Budget: £30,000 or £21,000

Time Lock is a 1957 British thriller film directed by Gerald Thomas and starring Vincent Winter, Lee Patterson and Betty McDowall. It was written by Peter Rogers based on the CBC Television First Performance play of the same title by Arthur Hailey. It features a young, pre-James Bond Sean Connery. The film follows the attempt to rescue a six-year-old boy who is accidentally locked in a bank vault. The film was released in 1957 on a double bill with Ed Wood's Plan 9 From Outer Space (1957).

== Plot ==
Young Steven Walker, when accompanying his mother to a Toronto bank, accidentally gets locked in the bank's vault. With less than 10 hours of oxygen remaining in the vault, it becomes a race against time to save him.

== Cast ==
- Robert Beatty as Pete Dawson
- Lee Patterson as Colin Walker
- Betty McDowall as Lucille Walker
- Vincent Winter as Steven Walker
- Robert Ayres as Inspector Andrews
- Alan Gifford as George Foster
- Larry Cross as reporter
- Sandra Francis as Evelyn Webb
- Gordon Tanner as Dr. Hewitson
- Jack Cunningham as Max Jarvis
- Victor Wood as Howard Zeeder
- Peter Mannering as Dr. Foy
- Roland Brand as police officer
- Sean Connery as Bill, the welder's assistant

== Production ==
Although set in Canada, the film was shot at Beaconsfield Studios in England (per film credits).

Rogers called the film "a little gem" and said it resulted in the Woolf brothers offering Thomas The Vicious Circle.

== Reception ==
The Monthly Film Bulletin wrote: "Arthur Hailey has written several plays for Canadian television; and this one has all the marks of having been intended for the small screen. It is mostly played on a single set; the one or two outdoor scenes add nothing to the general atmosphere. The claustrophobic tension would probably have been conveyed better if it had been confined within the four walls of the bank. As it is the film is rather slow and too long to sustain the excitement; though it is competently put together, with sound performances from all the principal players except Betty McDowall, who fails to convey the anguish of the child's mother, "

Kine Weekly wrote: "The staging is naturally restricted, but the characters are kept moving and there is much human interest, as well as tension. A little gem of its type. ... The picture is not permitted great freedom of action, but sound acting and resourceful direction enable it to crowd a lot of drama and suspense into a litle space. Vincent Winter is inevitably kept in the dark, but nevertheless has his moments as the incarcerated Steven, Robert Beatty, although a late arrival, does his stuff as the forthright Dawson and Betty MeDowall, Lee Patterson and Alan Gifford register as Lucille, Colin and Foster. Dialogue is reduced fo a minimum, while the climax will have audiences on the edge of their seas."

Variety wrote: "Modestly designed as a supporting feature, Time Lock measures up well against more ambitious productions and will hold average audiences. ... Acting is crisp and competent with the use of several Canadian thespians now working in Britain insures maximum authenticity. There are standout performances by Robert Beatty, as the tough vault expert; Alan Gifford, as the distraught bank manager; Lee Patterson and Betty McDowall, as the helpless parents ... and Vincent Winter, as the kid who causes all the trouble."

In British Sound Films: The Studio Years 1928–1959 David Quinlan rated the film as "good", writing: "Taut, economical thriller."
