= Vincent Winter =

Scottish actor (1947–1998)

- Born: 29 December 1947; Aberdeen, Aberdeenshire, Scotland
- Died: 2 November 1998 (aged 50); Chertsey, Surrey, England
- Occupation: Actor
- Years active: 1953-1996
- Partner: Barbara Harley

Vincent Winter (29 December 1947 – 2 November 1998) was a Scottish child film actor who, as an adult, continued to work in the film industry as a production manager and in other capacities. He was an assistant director and actor, known for Superman (1978), The Little Kidnappers (1953) and Superman III (1983). He died on 2 November 1998 in Chertsey, Surrey, England, UK.

== Career ==
Winter was born in Aberdeen, Scotland, and made his first film appearance at the age of six in The Kidnappers (US: The Little Kidnappers, 1953) jointly winning an Academy Juvenile Award with Jon Whiteley. He appeared in several films as a child including Beyond This Place (US: Web of Evidence, 1959), Gorgo (1961), the Walt Disney features Greyfriars Bobby (1961), Almost Angels (1962), The Horse Without a Head (1963) and The Three Lives of Thomasina (1963).

As an adult, he continued to work in the film industry behind the scenes. He was a production manager on such films as For Your Eyes Only (1981), Superman III (1983), Indiana Jones and the Temple of Doom (1984) and The Color Purple (1985), and worked as part of a film crew in other tasks.

He died in Chertsey, Surrey, as a result of a heart attack.

== Filmography ==
=== Actor ===
Year	Title	Role	Notes
1953	The Kidnappers (US: The Little Kidnappers)	Davy	Academy Juvenile Award
1955	The Dark Avenger	John Holland	a.k.a. The Warriors (USA)
1956	A Day of Grace	Ian	
1957	Time Lock	The Boy - Steven Walker	
1959	Beyond This Place	Paul Mathry, Aged 6	a.k.a. Web of Evidence (USA)
1959	The Bridal Path	Neil	
1961	Gorgo	Sean	
1961	Greyfriars Bobby: The True Story of a Dog	Tammy	
1962	Almost Angels	Tony Fiala	a.k.a. Born to Sing (UK)
1963	The Horse Without a Head	Fernand	
1964	The Three Lives of Thomasina	Hughie Stirling	(final film role)

=== Production Manager ===
Year	Title	Role	Notes
1980	Superman II	Production manager	
1981	For Your Eyes Only	Unit manager	
1983	Superman III	Production manager	
1984	Indiana Jones and the Temple of Doom	Production supervisor	In Macau
1985	Santa Claus	Production supervisor	a.k.a. Santa Claus: The Movie
1985	The Color Purple	Production supervisor	Kenya unit
1989	Henry V	Production supervisor	
1989	A Dry White Season	Production supervisor	
1995	Restoration	Production supervisor	
1996	The Wind in the Willows	Production manager	a.k.a. Mr. Toad's Wild Ride

=== Second Unit Director or Assistant Director ===
Year	Title	Role	Notes
1975	Royal Flash	Assistant director	
1977	Checkered Flag or Crash	First assistant director	
1977	Are You Being Served?	Assistant director	a.k.a. Are You Being Served?: The Movie
1978	Superman	Assistant director	a.k.a. Superman: The Movie
1978	The Stud	First assistant director	
1978	The Sailor's Return	First assistant director	
1979	The Spaceman and King Arthur	Assistant director	
1985	Magnum, P.I.	First assistant director: UK	Episode Deja Vu: Part 1

=== Miscellaneous crew ===
Year	Title	Role	Notes
1980	Nijinsky	Location manager	
1981	For Your Eyes Only	Location manager	
1991	The Rainbow Thief	Producer	
1991	Under Suspicion	Associate producer	
1995	Cutthroat Island	Unit manager: model unit	Visual effects
2000	Mrs. Caldicot's Cabbage War		(In memory of) Thanks
