= Josef Lorenzl =

Austrian sculptor (1892–1950)

Bronze nude of a dancer on an onyx plinth by Lorenzl, c. 1925

Josef Lorenzl (1 September 1892 – 15 August 1950) was an Austrian sculptor and ceramicist of the Art Deco period, the same era as Ferdinand Preiss (1882–1943) and Demetre Chiparus (1886–1947).

== Early life ==
Lorenzl was born on 1 September 1882 in Vienna, Austria and died there on 15 August 1950. Little is known about his early years, but more is known about his later life. Lorenzl started his career working at a foundry at the Vienna Arsenal where he learned the techniques of bronze casting. The Vienna Arsenal was a military storage complex located in the south-eastern part of Vienna.

== Career ==
While at the Vienna Arsenal, Lorenzl produced many bronze and chryselephantine sculptures, the latter using both bronze and ivory, and captivated by the female form he became famed for his shapely dancing girls with long, elegant legs and closed eyes. These pieces of his were signed "Enzl", "Lor", "R. Lor", "Renz" or "Renzl". Occasionally the name "Crejo" appears on his pieces, Crejo having been a painter and one of Lorenzl's friends, and who sometimes applied colour to the pieces. These joint works are sought-after items. The large majority of Lorenzl's figurines were attached to Brazilian green onyx plinths.

Lorenzl's talents also extended to being a gifted ceramicist. He produced pieces for Goldscheider, working from a studio on company grounds. As with his chryselephantine pieces, his ceramic works were in great demand and became the embodiment of the Art Déco period. Famous amongst these is "The Butterfly Girl" after the famous dancer Niddy Impekoven from the 1920s. Lorenzl also worked for two other Viennese firms, Porzellanfabrik Hertwig & Co. and Keramos Porcelain.

'Keramos' or 'Wiener Kunst-Keramik und Porzellan Manufaktur AG' was founded in 1910 by several disabled war veterans, subsidised by Austria and later became a public company, directed by Otto Köller, and Rudof and Heinrich Wolf. It was located in Schwarze Adlerstiege, while the factory operated from 17 Schleiergasse.

== Death ==
After Lorenzl's death on 15 August 1950, his wife Anna (Njura) Lorenzl, destroyed a large number of his figurines.

== Bibliography ==
- Robert E. Dechant, F. Goldscheider: Goldscheider. Firmengeschichte und Werkverzeichnis. Historismus, Jugendstil, Art Déco, 1950er Jahre. Arnoldsche, Stuttgart 2007, ISBN 978-3-89790-216-9.
