= Palais Augarten =

Coordinates: 48°13′20″N 16°22′46″E

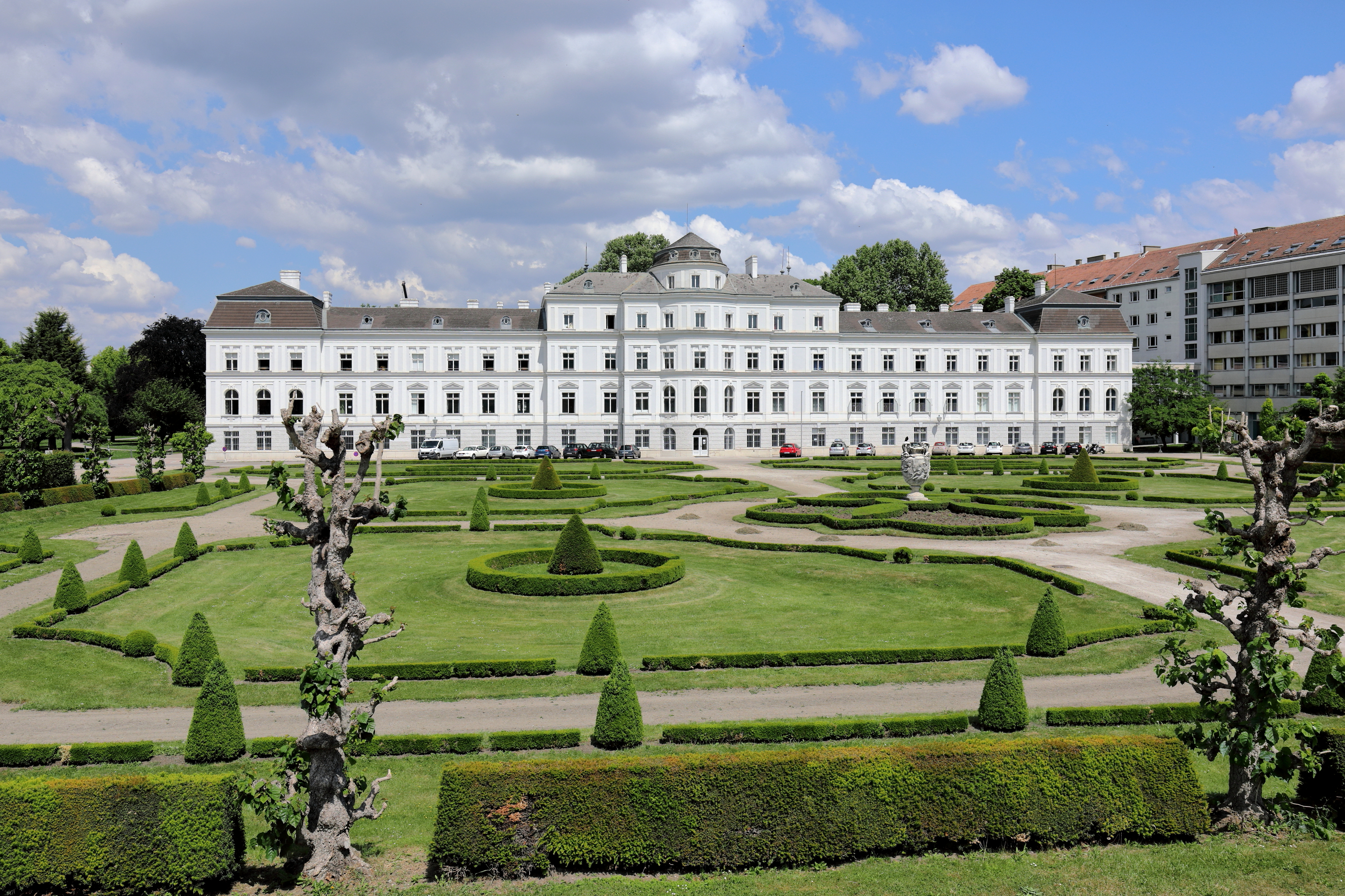
- Interactive map of Palais Augarten

General information
- Architectural style: Baroque
- Location: Vienna, Austria

Palais Augarten is a Baroque palace in the district of Leopoldstadt, Vienna, Austria. Constructed in the late seventeenth century by Johann Bernhard Fischer von Erlach on the site of a Jagdschloss and gardens, the palace and gardens were expanded in the nineteenth century under Emperor Franz Joseph I of Austria. Despite extensive damage suffered during World War II, the palace has been maintained almost in its original appearance, and many of the original furnishings can still be found there. Today, Palais Augarten is the home and rehearsal space of the Vienna Boys' Choir, who also have their own school there. The palace is located in the 130-acre Augarten park, which is the oldest Baroque garden in Vienna.

== History ==
Until the 18th century, the present-day Leopoldstadt district consisted of forestland used by the Emperor and his court as a hunting ground. In 1614, Emperor Matthias built a hunting château on the site. In 1649, Emperor Ferdinand III added a Dutch-style gardens. Under his successor, Emperor Leopold I, the Augarten area saw increased settlement by nobility and Carmelite monks and eventually became part of Vienna. In 1677, Leopold I, who gave his name to the district (Leopold's City), added an extensive Baroque garden to the hunting château of his predecessors. In 1683, during the Battle of Vienna, Turkish forces used the area as a military base, and by the end of the war, the Baroque gardens were completely destroyed.

In 1688, the Augarten hunting château was sold to businessman Zacharias Leeb, who hired Johann Bernhard Fischer von Erlach to construct a palace on the site. Augarten park remained the possession of the Emperor. Palais Augarten was completed in 1692, and was originally called "Palais Leeb". In the coming decades, the palace was expanded and remodeled several times, changing owners more than once. In 1712, Emperor Charles VI hired landscape gardener Jean Trehet to redesign the Baroque park in the French style.

In 1780 this palace came into the possession of Joseph II, Holy Roman Emperor. Until the beginning of the twentieth century it remained in the possession of the Habsburg family. During this period, and especially in the nineteenth century, many balls were held in the palace, and a salon was opened. Among the guests at that time were Richard Wagner, Franz Liszt, and Hans Makart.

The greatest ball in the Palais Augarten took place on the occasion of the Viennese World's Fair of 1873; among the guests were Emperor Francis Joseph I and Czar Alexander II of Russia. In 1897 the palace was significantly remodeled for the family of Archduke Otto, the nephew of Emperor Francis Joseph.

From 1934 to 1936 the palace was inhabited by the Austrian Chancellor Kurt Schuschnigg. During the Second World War, the estate was badly damaged, but after the war it was completely restored. In 1948 it was given to the Vienna Boys' Choir. The porcelain manufactory Vienna Porcelain Manufactory Augarten is also located there. Today the palace, along with the rest of the Augarten, is in the possession of the state of Austria.
