= Vienna Boys' Choir =

Austrian choir

Vienna Boys' Choir Wiener Sängerknaben
- Choir
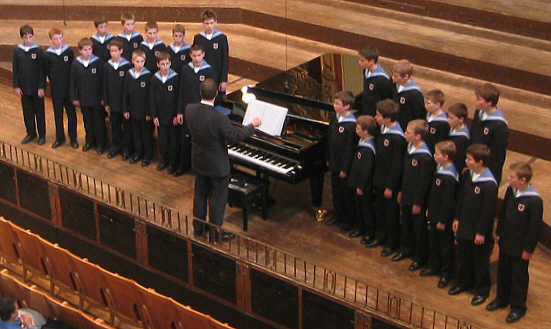
- Vienna Boys' Choir performing in 2003
- Also known as: Vienna Choir Boys
- Origin: Vienna, Austria
- Founded: 1924; 102 years ago
- Music director: Gerald Wirth
- Headquarters: Palais Augarten; Vienna, Austria
- Website: www.wsk.at

The Vienna Boys' Choir (German: Wiener Sängerknaben) is a choir of boy sopranos and altos based in Vienna, Austria. It is one of the best-known boys' choirs in the world. The boys are selected mainly from Austria, but also from many other countries.

The choir is a private, non-profit organization. There are approximately 100 choristers between the ages of nine and fourteen. The boys are divided into four touring choirs, named after Austrian composers Bruckner, Haydn, Mozart, and Schubert, which combined perform about 300 concerts each year before almost 500,000 people. Each group tours for about nine to eleven weeks. Some pieces include "Good Morning" and "Merry Christmas from Vienna Boys".

== Early history ==
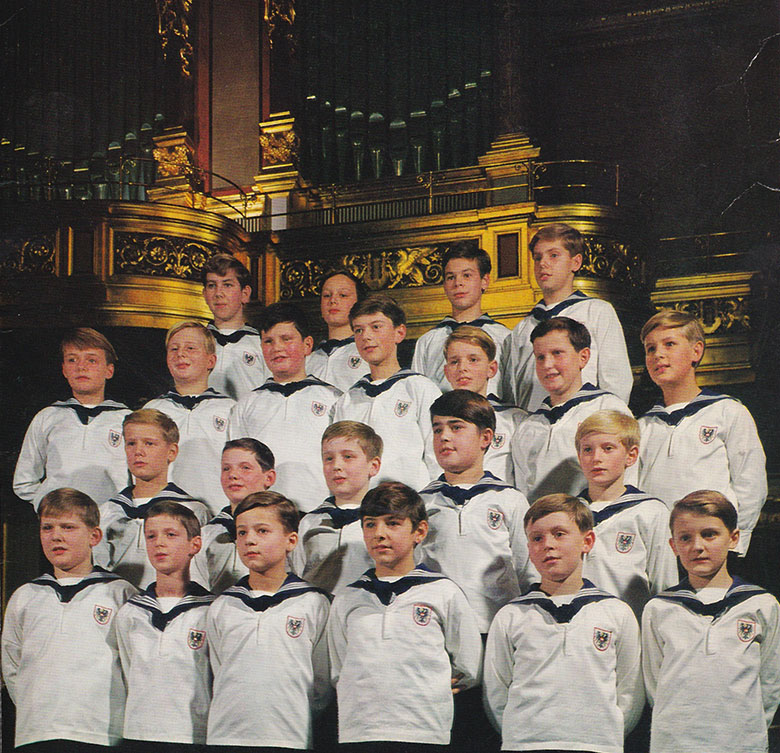
The Vienna Boys' Choir in 1970

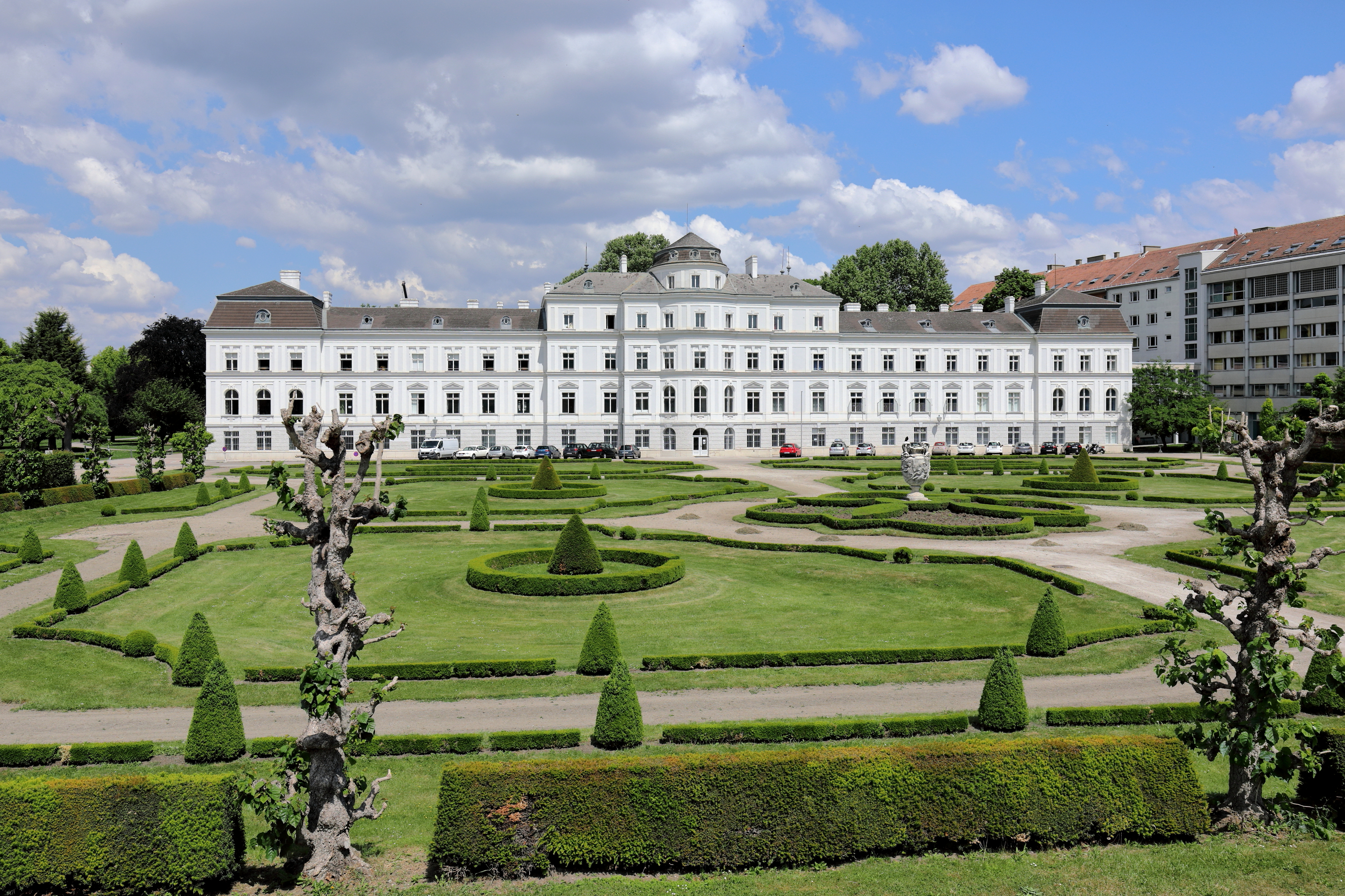
Palais Augarten has served since 1948 as a boarding school for the choir

The choir is the modern-day descendant of the boys' choirs of the Viennese Court, dating back to the late Middle Ages. The Wiener Hofmusikkapelle was established by a letter from Emperor Maximilian I of the Holy Roman Empire on 30 June 1498, instructing court officials to employ a singing master, two basses and six boys. George Slatkonia became the director of the ensemble. The role of the choir (numbering between 24 and 26) was to provide musical accompaniment for the church mass. Additionally, the Haydn brothers were members of the St. Stephen's Cathedral choir, directed at the time by Georg Reutter II, who used this choir in his duties for the imperial court, which at the time had no boy choristers of its own.

Over the centuries, the choir has worked with many composers, including Heinrich Isaac, Hofhaimer, Biber, Fux, Caldara, Gluck, Salieri, Mozart, Schubert and Bruckner.

In 1920, following the fall of the Austrian Empire, the Hofkapelle (court orchestra) was disbanded. However, the rector at the time, Josef Schnitt, sought a continuation of the tradition. In 1924, the Vienna Boys' Choir was officially founded, and it has evolved into a professional music group. The choir adopted the now-famous blue-and-white sailor suit, replacing the imperial military cadet uniform that included a dagger. The composer HK Gruber is one of the graduates of the reformed choir.

While touring in Australia in 1939, the boys became stranded in Perth when their ship returning them to Austria was seized. Germany had just invaded Poland and Australia had entered the Second World War. The catholic archbishop of Melbourne, Dr Daniel Mannix, organised the boys' foster care as long as they formed a choir at St Patrick's Cathedral in Melbourne. Staying together in Australia saved them from conscription into the German army as they came of age during the war. Only one of the boys returned to Vienna after the war.

Since 1948, Palais Augarten has served as the rehearsal venue and boarding school, which goes from kindergarten level up to middle school level.

In 1961, Walt Disney filmed Almost Angels, a fictional drama about (and starring) the Vienna Boys' Choir, set and filmed in the Palais Augarten. It was Disney who, for cinematographic reasons, persuaded the Austrian government to allow the boys to legally wear the Austrian national emblem on the breast of their uniform, a tradition that continues to this day.

In 1978, the Vienna Boys' Choir began filming a historical documentary called Ein kaiserlicher Chor. This documentary was being filmed over the summer brought along with it legal and operational challenges for the choir. Austrian law (contained in Bundesgesetzblatt 146 from 1948) prohibited child labor over school holidays. Walter Tautschnig, the choir's director, saw many distressing implications of the law to include the possibility of cancelling Christmas performances and tours that would historically occur over school breaks. In 1979, there was a revision to the Youth Employment Law that was unanimously approved which allowed them to maintain their performance schedule under the supervision of the Children's Services Office of Vienna.

In 1996, Agnes Grossmann became the first woman to be named the artistic director of the Vienna Boys' Choir. In an interview by the Viennese press, Grossmann stated "This is a breakthrough, and I hope it will show what the possibilities are for women."

In 2004, The Vienna Girls' Choir were founded. They receive the same training as the Vienna Boys' Choir. The choirs perform independently.

== Recent history ==
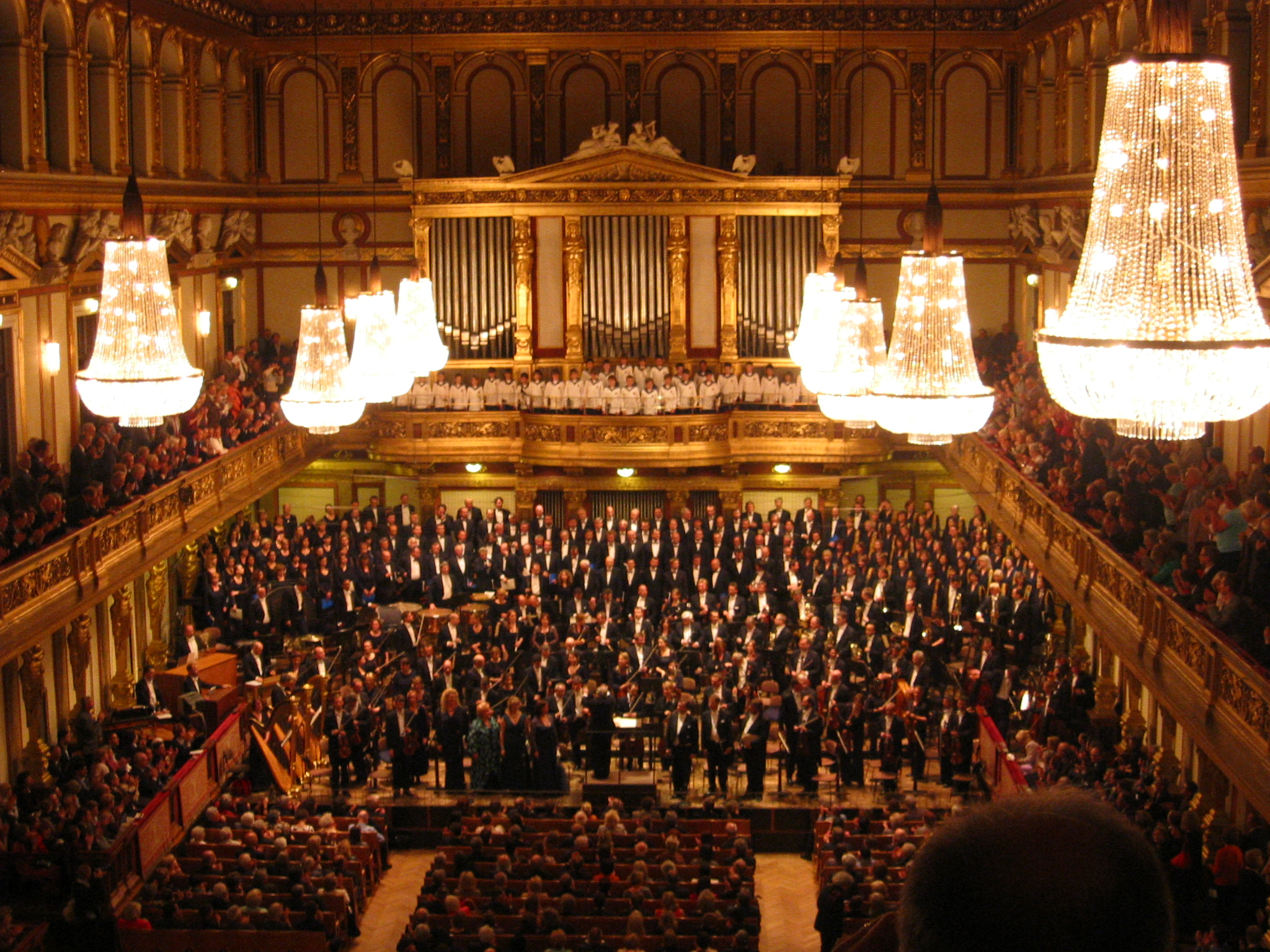
G. Mahler, Symphony of a Thousand – Vienna Boys' Choir – Wiener Singverein – Slovenský filharmonický zbor – Staatskapelle Berlin – Pierre Boulez – Wiener Musikverein (April 2009)

Gerald Wirth became the choir's artistic director in 2001. However, since then, the choir has come under pressure to modernize and has faced criticism of their musical standards, leading to a split with the Vienna State Opera. The choir has for the first time had to advertise for recruits after a rival choir school was established by Ioan Holender, director of the opera company. He complained of both falling standards and poor communication with the choir. He said that the State Opera sometimes trained boys for particular stage roles, only to find out on the day of performance that they were unavailable as they had gone on tour with the choir. Some boys were attracted to the rival choir school by the prospect of a more relaxed atmosphere and of performance fees being paid directly to them.

The Vienna Boys' Choir has sought to update its image, recording pop music selections and adopting an alternative uniform to the sailor suits used since the 1920s, allowing the boys to dance as they sing. After Eugen Jesser died in May 2008, Walter Nettig became the choir's president. Gerald Wirth has been the artistic director since 2001, and he also became the choir's president in 2013. The current President is Erich Arthold, who started serving this position in Dec 2022.

The Vienna Boys Choir Music Academy (VBCMA) is the official music academy of the Vienna Boys Choir (VBC) with its headquarters located in Hong Kong. VBCMA carries on with the pedagogical traditions of the Vienna Boy Choir, offering year-round music programmes with songs from different cultures and in different languages. Classes are conducted from September every year to July next year in schools, community venues and online.

The Vienna Boys Choir Music Academy Foundation (VBCMAF) is a registered charitable organization under the Section 88 of the Inland Revenue Ordinance in Hong Kong. The 'Hong Kong - Vienna Music Festival' was set up by the Foundation in 2016, promoting the exchange of musicians from both places and presenting joint performances by them, such as the 'Mahler Symphony No 8' and the 'Beethoven from Day to Night - Piano Sonatas Marathon". The Festival also presented the 'Summer Music Academy' every year (except the pandemic years in 2020-2022), where a team of international conductors leads a weekly music camp for students from 7–25 years old.

In 2010, following sexual abuse allegations from two former choristers stemming from the late 1960s and early 1980s, the Vienna Boys' Choir opened a confidential phone and e-mail hotline to allow others to come forward. Eight possible victims came forward saying they were abused, either by staff or other choir members.

== Selected discography ==
=== Christmas ===
- Frohe Weihnachten (2015)
- Wiener Sängerknaben Goes Christmas (2003)
- Frohe Weihnacht (Merry Christmas) (1999)
- Christmas in Vienna / Heiligste Nacht (1990)
- Merry Christmas from the Vienna Choir Boys (1982)
- Christmas with the Vienna Choir Boys (with Hermann Prey)
- Christmas with the Vienna Boys' Choir, London Symphony Orchestra (1990)
- Weihnacht mit den Wiener Sängerknaben (Hans Gillesberger 1980)
- The Little Drummer Boy (TV 1968)
- Die Wiener Sängerknaben und ihre Schönsten ... (1967)
- Frohe Weihnacht (1960)
- Christmas Angels (RCA Gold Seal)
- Silent Night

=== Pop music ===
- I Am from Austria (2006)
- Wiener Sängerknaben Goes Pop (2002)

=== Other recordings ===
- Orff: Carmina Burana (with André Previn and the Vienna Philharmonic Orchestra) (1994)
- Angelic Voices (1998)
- "Doraemon no Uta" for the animated motion picture Doraemon: Nobita and the Legend of the Sun King (2000)
- Silk Road: Songs Along the Road and Time (Music from the Motion Picture) (with Yulduz Usmanova and Nursultan Saroy) (2008)
- LG G2 Theme song and ringtone (2013)
- Strauss For Ever (2018)

The Vienna Boys' Choir performed the song "The Little Drummer Boy" in the Rankin/Bass TV special of the same name.

== Feature films ==
- Kleine große Stimme (Little big voice) (2015)
- Songs for Mary (2014)
- Bridging the Gap (2013)
- Silk Road (2008)
- Almost Angels (1962)
- When the Bells Sound Clearly (1959)
- Der schönste Tag meines Lebens (The best day of my life) (1957)
- Voices of Spring (1952)
- Singende Engel (The singing angels) (1947)
- Boys of the Prater (1946)
- Concert in Tirol (1938)
- An Orphan Boy of Vienna (1936)

== Featured composers ==
- Johann Sebastian Bach
- Ludwig van Beethoven
- Heinrich Ignaz Franz Biber
- Benjamin Britten
- Anton Bruckner
- Antonio Caldara
- Jacobus Gallus
- George Frideric Handel
- Joseph Haydn
- Wolfgang Amadeus Mozart
- Franz Schubert
- Salomon Sulzer

=== Smaller works based on anthologies ===
- Anton Bruckner, Christus factus est
- Anton Bruckner, Locus iste
- Anton Bruckner, Os justi
- Anton Bruckner, Virga Jesse
- Joseph Leopold Eybler, Omnes de Saba venient
- Gabriel Fauré, Pie Jesu
- Jacobus Gallus, Natus est nobis
- Jacobus Gallus, Pueri concinite
- Jacobus Gallus, Repleti sunt
- Georg Friedrich Händel, Zadok the Priest
- Joseph Haydn, Du bist's, dem Ruhm und Ehre gebühret
- Joseph Haydn, Insanae et vanae curae
- Michael Haydn, Lauft, ihr Hirten allzugleich
- Jacbus de Kerle, Sanctus – Hosanna – Benedictus
- Wolfgang Amadeus Mozart, Kyrie Es-Dur KV 322
- Wolfgang Amadeus Mozart, Kyrie d-moll KV 341
- Wolfgang Amadeus Mozart, Misericordias Domini KV 222
- Wolfgang Amadeus Mozart, Sub tuum praesidium
- Giovanni Nascus, Incipit lamentatio
- Giovanni Pierluigi da Palestrina, Hodie Christus natus est
- Michael Praetorius, In natali Domini
- Franz Schubert, Salve Regina D 386
- Franz Schubert, Tantum ergo D 962
- Franz Schubert, Totus in corde langueo D 136
- Giuseppe Verdi, Laudi alla Vergine Maria
- Giuseppe Verdi, Pater noster
- Tomás Luis de Victoria, O regem coeli
- Tomás Luis de Victoria, Una hora

== See also ==
- Vienna Girls' Choir
- Drakensberg Boys' Choir School
