= Vienna Porcelain Manufactory Augarten =

Austrian porcelain company

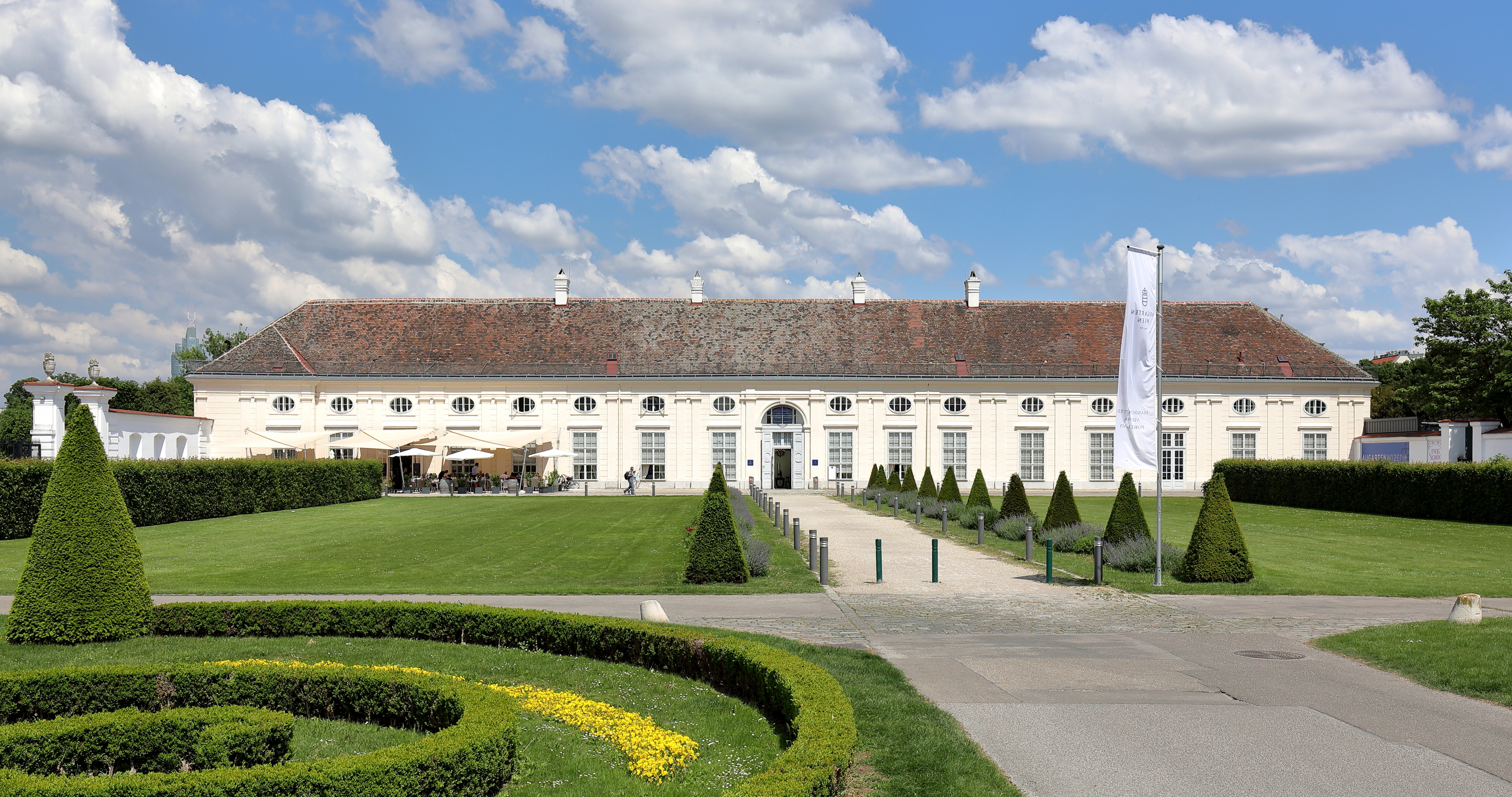
Porcelain Manufactory Augarten

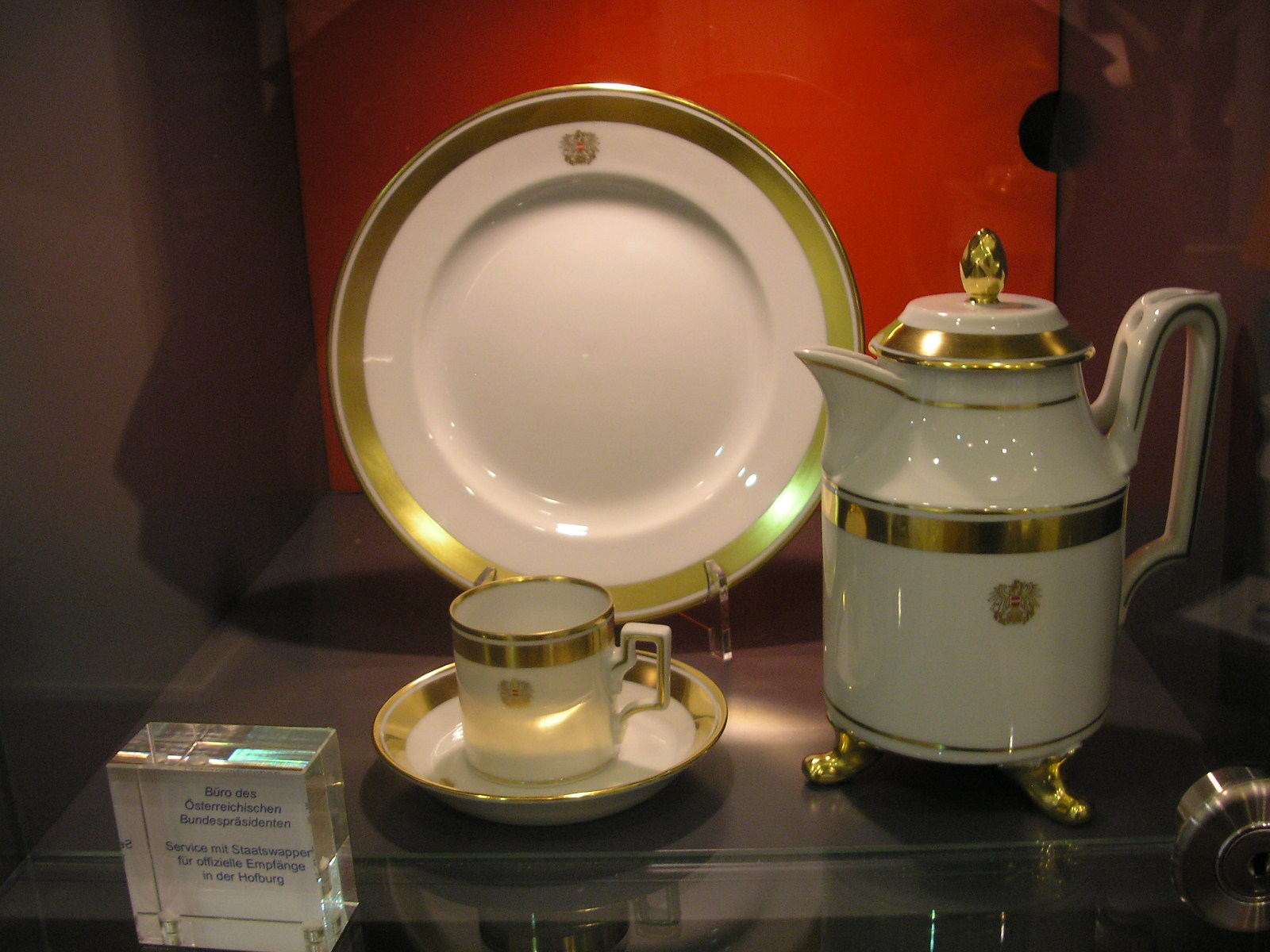
Tableware for official use by the Austrian Federal President

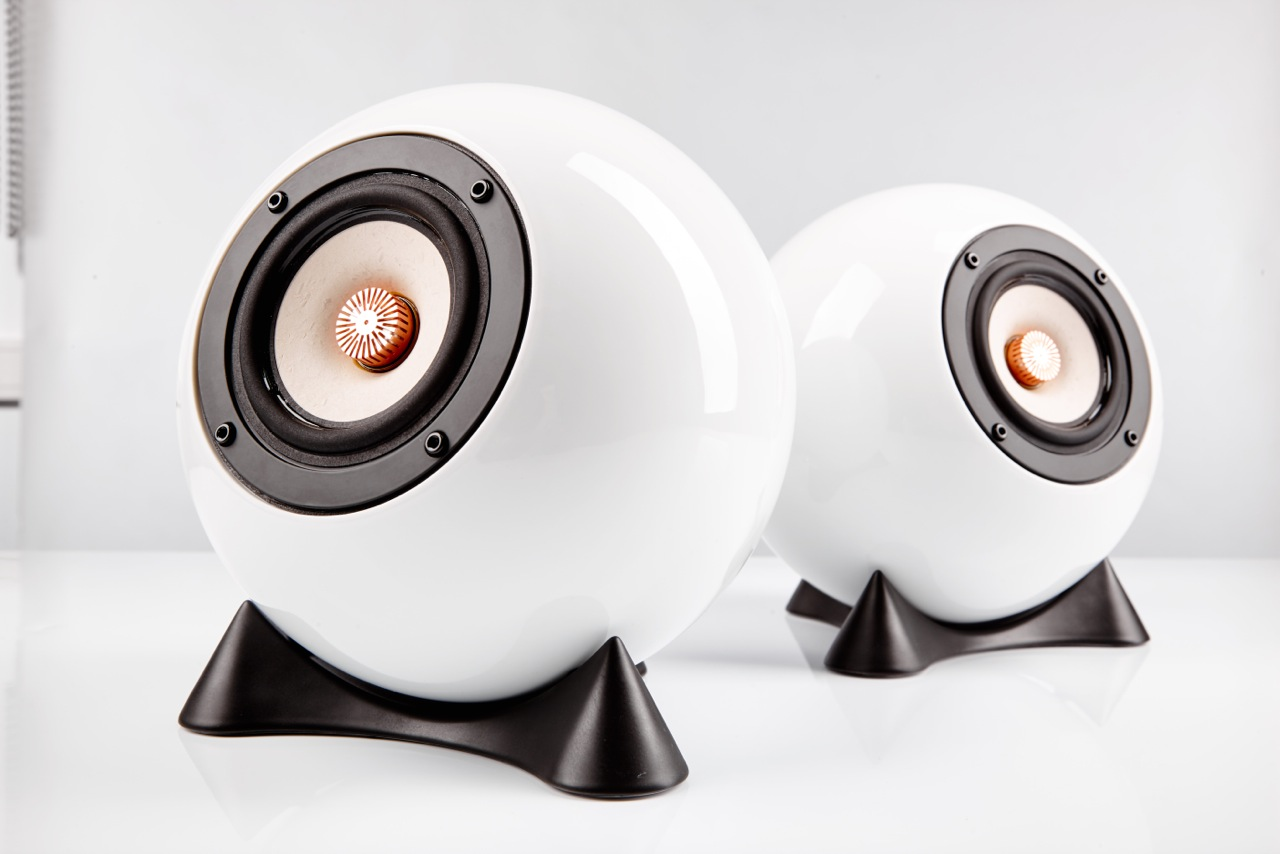
mo° sound Augarten Ball Speaker

The Vienna Porcelain Manufactory Augarten (German: Wiener Porzellanmanufaktur Augarten) is a porcelain manufactory located in Vienna, Austria. It was founded in 1923. It revived the traditions of the old Vienna porcelain manufactory by continuing the production methods and patterns of the historic manufactory. The Vienna Porcelain Manufactory Augarten is also home to the Augarten Porcelain Museum, which displays a collection of historic and contemporary porcelain pieces. In addition to its porcelain products, the company also produces glassware, cutlery, and other home accessories.

== History ==
The historic Vienna Porcelain Manufactory (1718–1864) was the second porcelain manufactory to be established in Europe. Dating back to a privilege given by the emperor to Claudius Innocentius du Paquier in 1718, it was, after Meissen porcelain, Europe's second oldest producer of hard-paste porcelain. Since 1744, pieces bore the shield from the coat of arms of the Dukes of Austria as a trademark.

The original Vienna manufactory went out of business in 1864. After that, the main porcelain factory of the Austro-Hungarian empire was the Herend Porcelain Manufactory, which had been competing with the Vienna manufactory as purveyors to the Imperial Court. The porcelain of the original Vienna manufactory is often referred to as Alt Wien ("Old Vienna") porcelain, to distinguish it from the products of the new Augarten manufactory.

== See also ==
- Porcelain manufacturing companies in Europe
