= Guido Balsamo Stella =

Italian painter and engraver

Guido Maria Balsamo Stella (11 May 1882 – 12 August 1941) was an Italian painter and engraver.

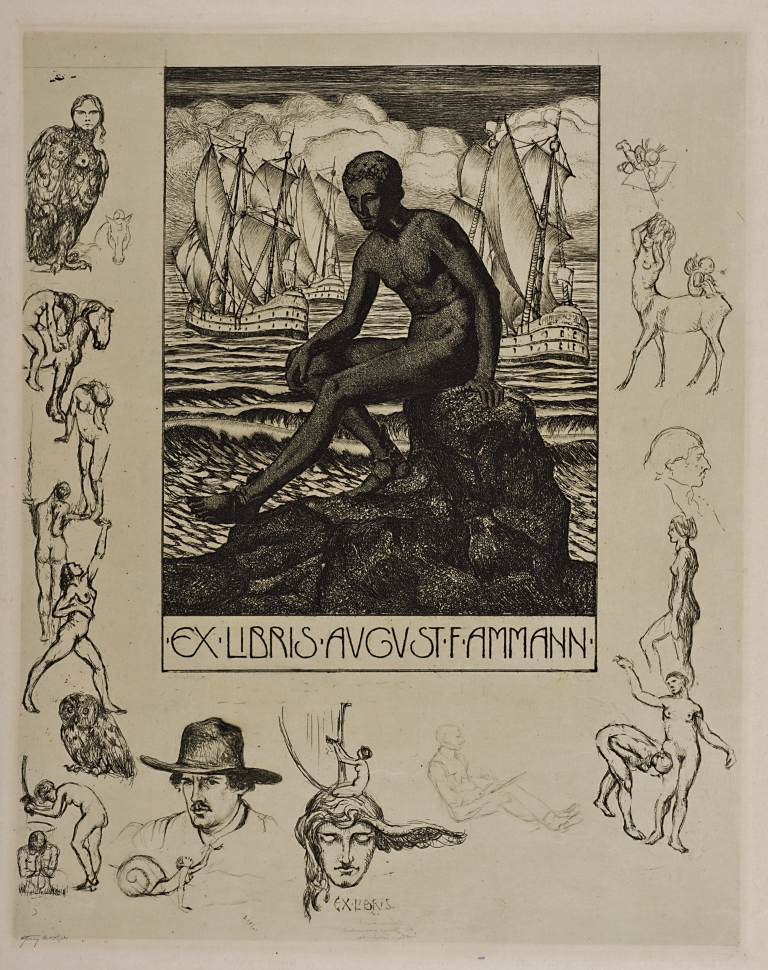
Guido Balsamo Stella Ex Libris August Ammann

== Biography ==
Born in Turin of parents Luigi Balsamo and Celestina Sommariva, Balsamo Stella soon lost his father and acquired the double surname from his mother's second husband, the Venetian Alessandro Stella. In 1896 Balsamo Stella followed his family and moved back to Turin from Venice.

Nothing is known about his education. In 1901 Balsamo Stella began working in a painter's studio in Ca 'Pesaro but because the local Municipality, contrary to the will of Duchess Felicita Bevilacqua La Masa, demanded the payment of rent, Guido left after less than two and a half years. From 1903 to 1904 he attended some lessons at the Free School of the Nude of the Venetian Academy.

Balsamo Stella soon went to Munich, where he had contacts with the Munich Secession, in particular with Dagobert Peche and Felice Rix. From 1909 Balsamo Stella attended the Academy of Fine Arts in Munich where he was taught by Albert Welti, Arnold Böcklin's student. He showed some of his works at the Secession exhibitions at the Glasspalast, while also working on the production of ex libris.

In 1914 Balsamo Stella obtained an award at the 11th Venice Biennale for his etching: "Il Vitello d'oro".

During the First World War, Balsamo Stella moved to Sweden with his wife Anna Akerdahl, also a painter. He dedicated himself to etching and to the study of glass engraving techniques alongside the glass masters of Orrefors and, on his return to Italy, he became a proponent for the renewal of Murano glass craftsmanship.

Upon his return to Italy Balsamo Stella first lived in Florence where from 1922 he taught at the Royal Institute of Art of S. Croce; he also set up a glass laboratory in Colle Val d'Elsa.

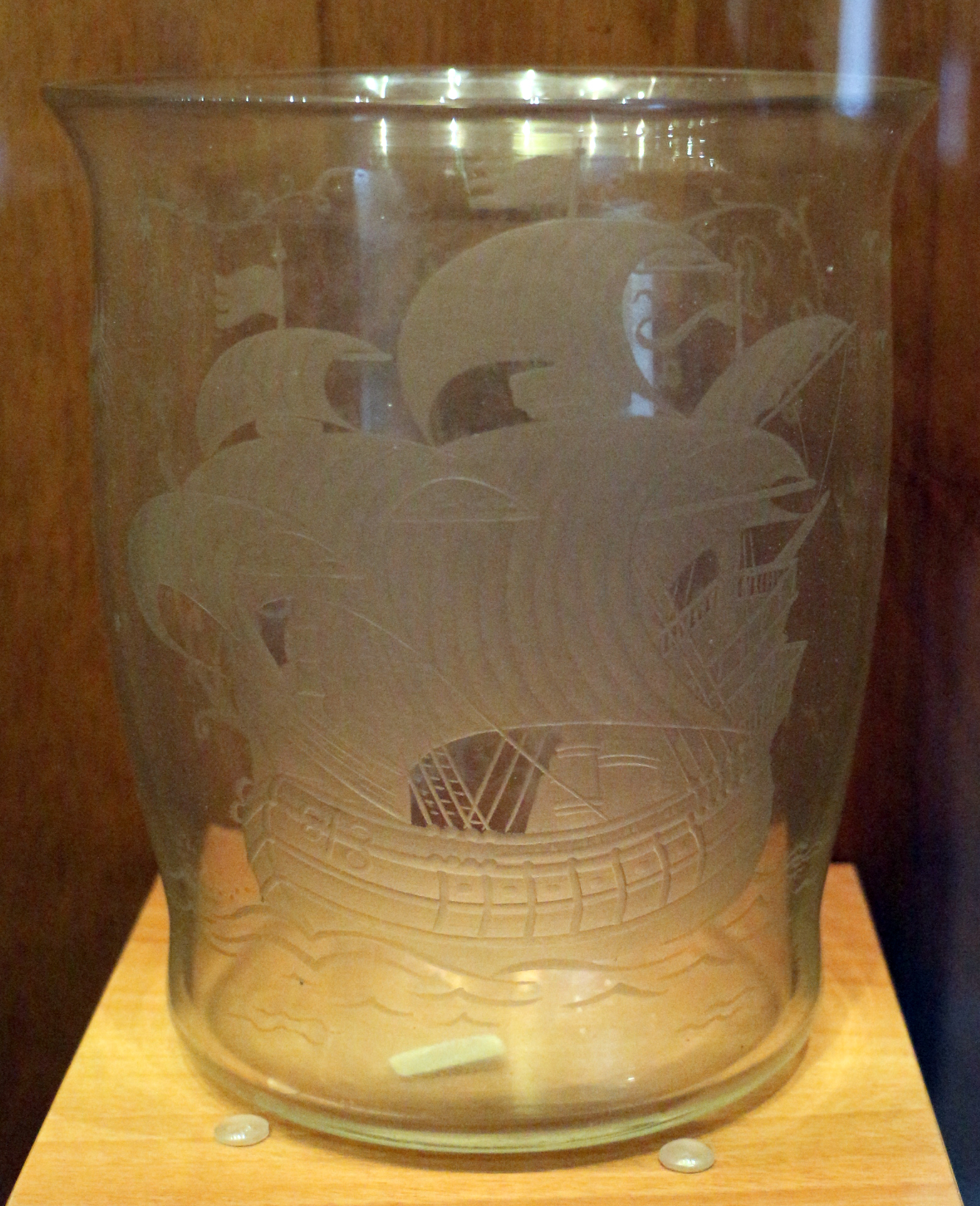
Venice, Guido Balsamo Stella, crystal vase, 1927

At a later time Balsamo Stella became the director of the State School of Art of Wood in Ortisei in Val Gardena (1924–1927) from where, however, he was removed at the request of the producers of sacred art who consider him too innovative. He then taught at the Pietro Selvatico State Institute of Art in Padua (1927–1929). In 1929 Balsamo Stella worked in Murano at SALIR (Studio Ars Labor Industrie Riunite).

In 1929 Balsamo Stella was called to Monza to head the prestigious ISIA (Higher Institute for Artistic Industries) where he remained until 1932. From 1936 Balsamo Stella directed the State Institute of Art in Venice. Balsamo Stella died suddenly in Asolo in 1941.
