= Michael Powolny =

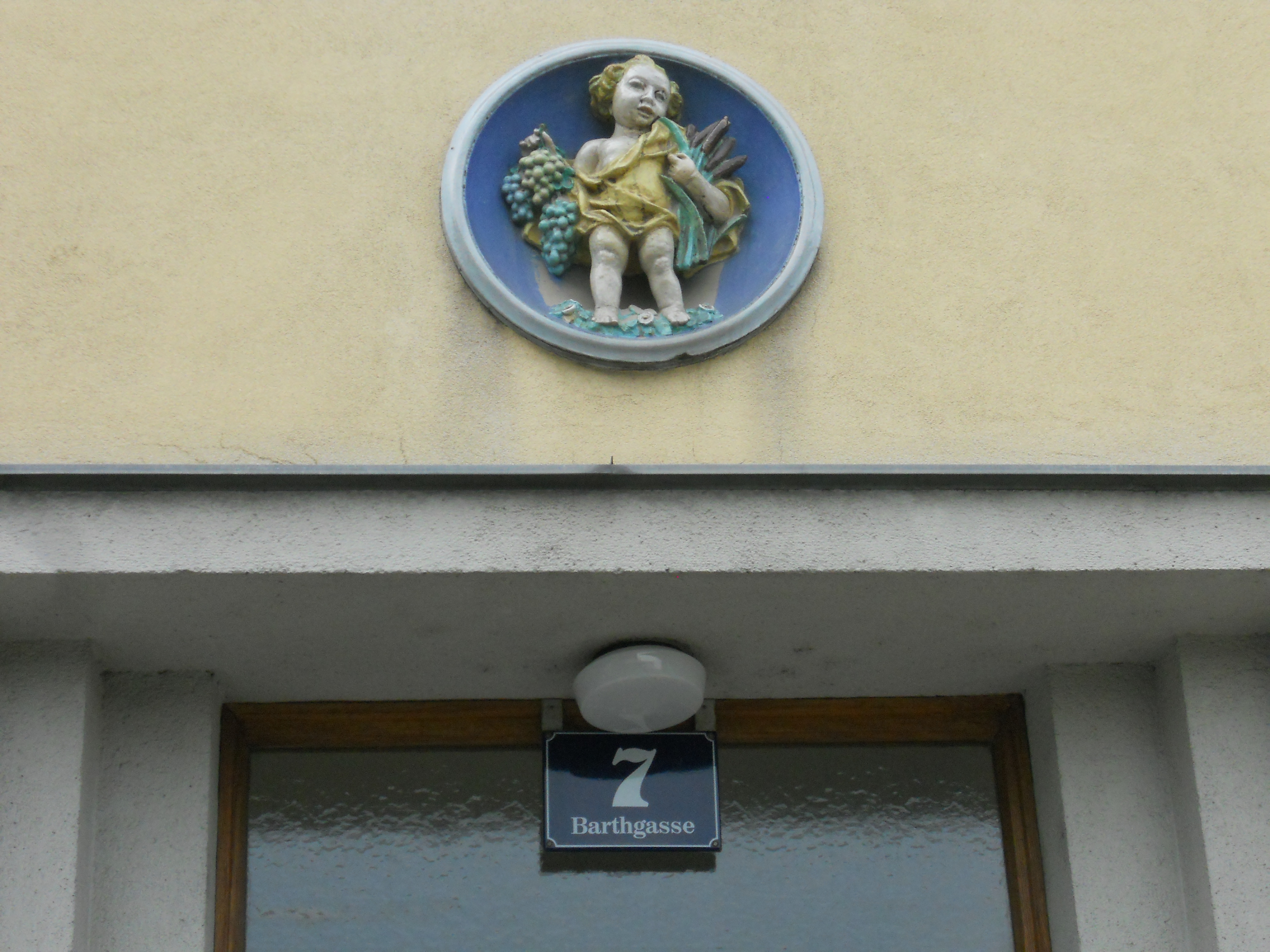
- Majolica gablestone in Vienna
- Born: 18 September 1871; Judenburg
- Died: 4 January 1954 (aged 82); Vienna

Michael Powolny (18 September 1871 – 4 January 1954) was an Austrian sculptor, medallist, ceramist, designer, and teacher.

Powolny was born in Judenburg. He was trained at Tonindustrie in Znaim, and from 1894 to 1901 in the Wiener Kunstgewerbeschule. In 1906 along with Bertold Löffler he founded the Wiener Keramik workshop, that became part of the Wiener Werkstätte a year later.

Powolny died in Vienna. He is known for various individual sculptures and municipal monuments such as fountains and war memorials, but also for designs for household objects, and Austrian coins.
