= Walter Bosse =

Viennese artist and designer

Walter Bosse (November 13, 1904 – December 13, 1979) was a Viennese artist, designer, ceramist, potter, metalworker, and craftsman noted for his modernist bronze animal figurines and grotesques.

== Early life ==
Walter Bosse, born November 13, 1904, in Vienna, was the son of artists Luise and Julius Bosse. His father worked as a portrait painter at the imperial court.

Walter Bosse attended the Wiener Kunstgewerbeschule, now the University of Applied Arts Vienna, from 1918 to 1921, where he studied ceramics under Michael Powolny, and ornament under Franz Cižek. He then attended the Munich School of Applied Arts (Münchner Kunstgewerbeschule). During his schooling he was given the opportunity to sell his work at the Wiener Werkstätte by Josef Hoffmann, who became a mentor to Bosse. Bosse opened his own shop in Kufstein in 1923.

== Career ==
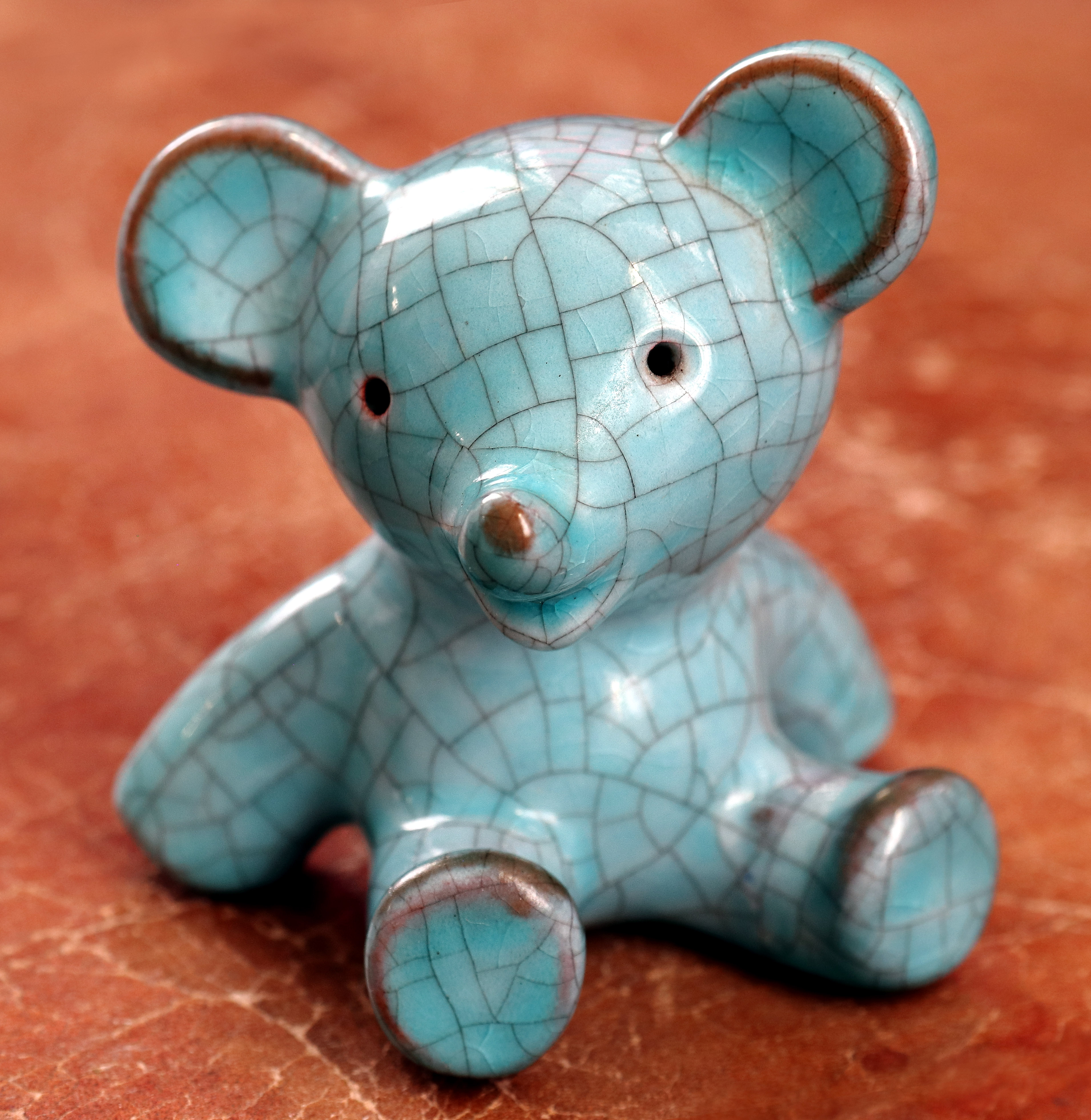
Figurine by Bosse

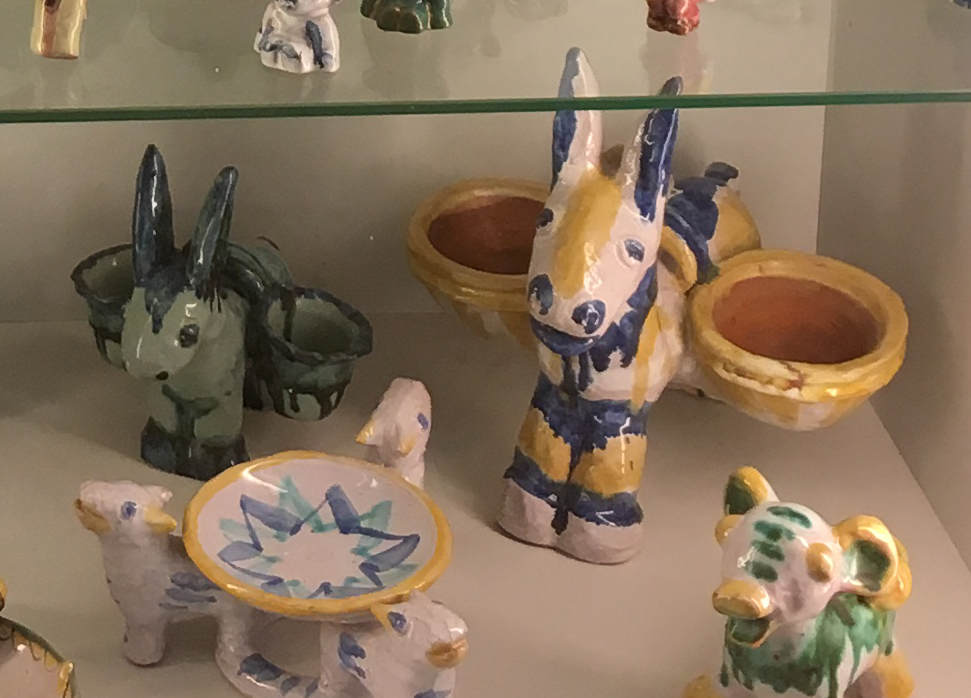
Works by Bosse

Bosse's work grew in popularity and a number of his pieces were shown at the International Exposition of Modern Industrial and Decorative Arts in 1925. He started designing for Augarten Porcelain Works (1924) as well as Goldscheider (1926) and Metzler and Ortloff (1927). In 1931, to meet increasing demand (especially in America), Bosse opened up a bigger shop in Kufstein, but by 1933 he started to feel the effects of the economic depression. By 1937, the Kufstein works were closed.

In 1938, now divorced, Bosse moved back to Vienna, where he founded Bosse Ceramics (Bosse-Keramik), which expanded under the new name “Terra” to include glass, toys, textiles. and a variety of craft items for the gift market. In the late 1940s, Bosse began experimenting with brass by giving his ceramic figures a metal coating to protect them from breakage.

He formed a partnership with Herta Baller, whose company (the Herta Baller Company) manufactured and marketed the brass figurines, this collaboration was called the Bosse/Baller company. In the early 1950s, Bosse and Baller began exploring a new style of brass called the “Black Gold Line” or "Black Golden Line" of brass figurines. He transitioned all of his efforts to brass and the figures became popular worldwide. Despite Bosse's success with his brass figures, it was still a difficult time for him financially. In 1953, partly fleeing from financial troubles, he moved to Iserlohn, Germany where he set up a new shop and continued production. In Vienna, the Herta Baller Company continued to make and sell Bosse's designs. Bosse also collaborated with Karlsruhe State Majolika Works on a number of pottery animal figures.

In 1958, he designed for Achatit Schirmer in Cologne. Bosse also turned his efforts to small, everyday items such as letter openers, keyrings, corkscrews, and pencil holders, all of which bear the distinctive "black and gold" look.

== Death and legacy ==
A number of Bosse's designs began to gain widespread popularity internationally, particularly his brass hedgehog ashtrays and hand-shaped bowls. But the designs' success led to forgeries popping up worldwide. His hedgehog ashtrays were reproduced by many forgers in various countries and with varying degrees of precision. To protect his designs, he engaged in court battles which would last the rest of his life and deplete most of his money. Because of these cases, he is considered to be a seminal figure relating to modern copyright law for designer goods.

The last years of Bosse's life saw him devoting much of his time and money to his legal disputes and on December 13, 1979, Bosse died with no money to his name in Iserlohn, Germany. His oeuvre consists of about 8,000 models and designs, of which about 3,000 are ceramics.

== Literature ==
- Schreyer-Hartmann, Cherica (2000). Walter Bosse: Leben, Kunst und Handwerk 1904-1979. Vienna: Brandstätter. ISBN 385498071X.
- Robinson & Meadows (2015). Austrian Figural Corkscrew Design: Auböck ∙ Bosse ∙ Hagenauer ∙ Rohac. Vancouver: Kitsilano Cellars. ISBN 978-0-9689294-1-4.
