= Wiener Werkstätte =

Production community of artists in Vienna

- Type: Public company
- Industry: Art, interior decoration
- Founded: 1903
- Founder: Fritz Waerndorfer; Josef Hoffmann; Joseph Maria Olbrich; Koloman Moser
- Defunct: 1932
- Headquarters: Vienna, Austria
- Key people: Josef Hoffmann, Koloman Moser, Dagobert Peche
- Products: Jewellery, ceramic, furniture, leather, fashion, metalworks

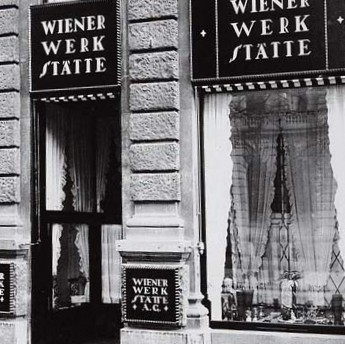
Shop of the Wiener Werkstätte

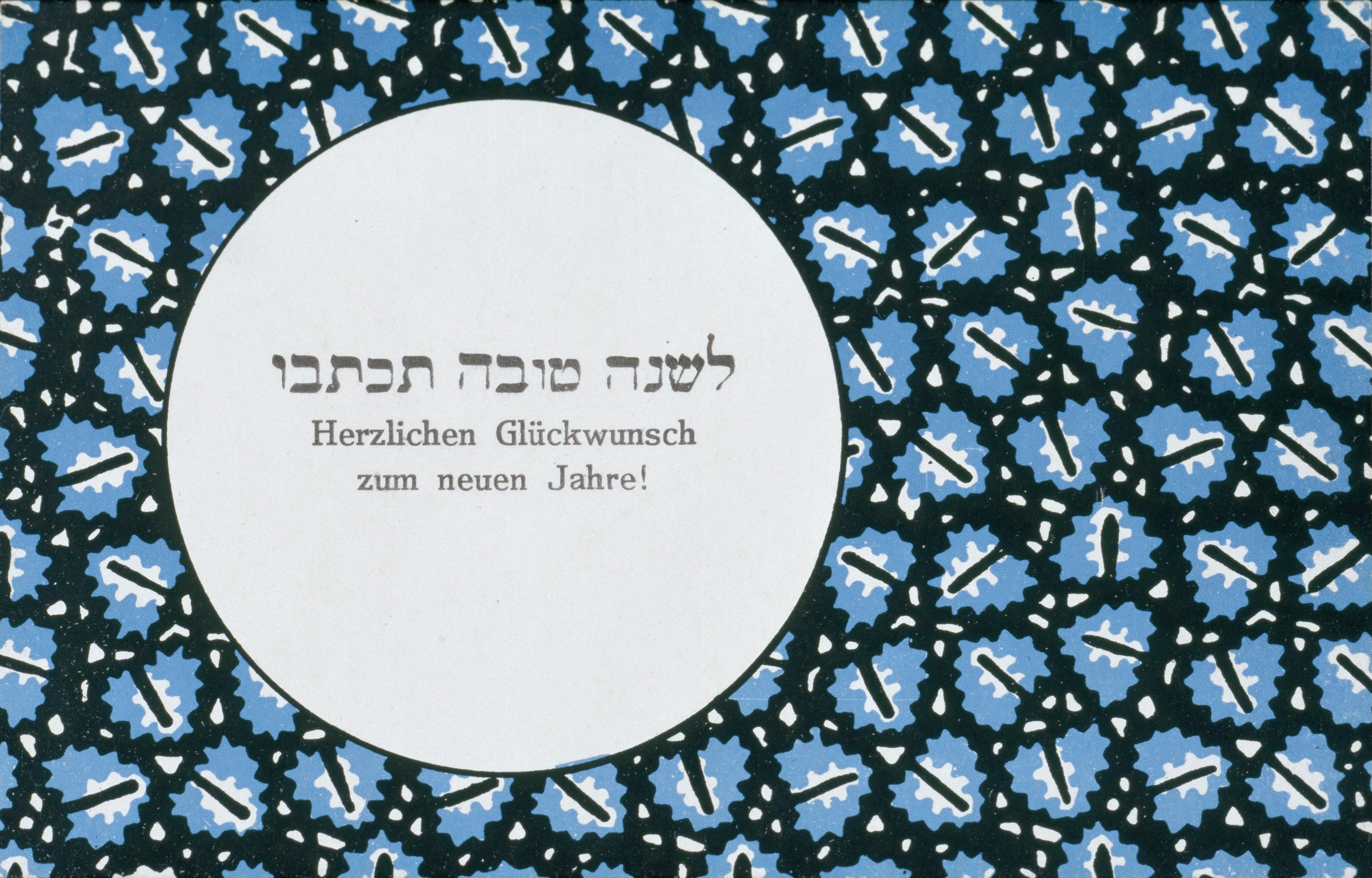
New Year Greeting's card designed by the company, about 1910

The Wiener Werkstätte ("Vienna Workshop"), established in 1903 by the graphic designer and painter Koloman Moser, the architect Josef Hoffmann and the patron Fritz Waerndorfer, was a productive association in Vienna, Austria, which brought together architects, artists, designers and artisans working in ceramics, fashion, silver, furniture and the graphic arts. The Workshop was "dedicated to the artistic production of utilitarian items in a wide range of media, including metalwork, leatherwork, bookbinding, woodworking, ceramics, postcards and graphic art, and jewelry." This meant the workshop created many items used in domestic spaces, which, as the scholar Rebecca Houze has argued, were previously seen as the domain of women. It is regarded as a pioneer of modern design, and its influence can be seen in later styles such as Bauhaus and Art Deco.

The company, was officially recorded in commercial court records as the Wiener Werkstätte Productiv-Genossenschaft von Kunsthandwerkern (Productive Cooperative of Artisans), though it was not really a cooperative but operated essentially as a manufacturing firm and retail store not entirely an alliance of artisans.

Following World War I, the workshop was beset by financial troubles and material shortages. Attempts to expand the workshop's base were unsuccessful, as was a reorganization under the direction of Austrian artist Philipp Häusler. In 1926, Workshop financier Otto Primavesi's bank failed and the Workshop limped through the stock market crash in 1929. Ultimately it was forced to close in 1932.

== Origins ==
The enterprise evolved from the Vienna Secession, founded in 1897 as a progressive alliance of artists and designers. From the start, the Secession had placed special emphasis on the applied arts, and its 1900 exhibition surveying the work of contemporary European design workshops prompted the young architect Josef Hoffmann and his artist friend Koloman Moser to consider establishing a similar enterprise.

Finally in 1903, with backing from the industrialist Fritz Wärndorfer, the Wiener Werkstätte began operations in three small rooms; it soon expanded to fill a three-story building with separate, specially designed facilities for metalwork, leatherwork, bookbinding, furniture and a paint shop. The range of product lines also included leather goods, enamel, jewellery, textiles, millinery fashion, lace, postcards and ceramics.

== Style ==
The Workshop "derived inspiration from the rich tradition of the glorious past" with fine workmanship and high attention to detail, hearkening back to a more civilized, and secure, time. Beginning with the 14th Exhibition of the Vienna Secession in 1902, the radical distinctiveness of certain Viennese artists began to emerge, setting a foundation for the widespread Modernist movement; this became known as Wiener-Werkstätte-Stil (literally, the Vienna Workshops Style). Among the innovators were the Austrian designers Gisela Falke von Lilienstein and Else Unger, and the Viennese architect Josef Hoffmann. The latter's cubist sculpture created in 1902 marked a break into independence for many Viennese artists. His works from this period are especially remarkable when one considers that the term "cubism" only found its way into the art lexicon around 1907 to describe the work of Pablo Picasso.

Dresses by Eduard Josef Wimmer-Wisgrill inspired Paul Poiret's when the latter visited the Workshop's Berlin exhibition in 1913. The work was considered both highly fashionable as well as functional. Other pieces at the exhibition included day and evening clothes, housedresses and negligees. Some of the earliest productions of the fashion workshop were artist smocks for Klimt and sculptor Anton Hanack.

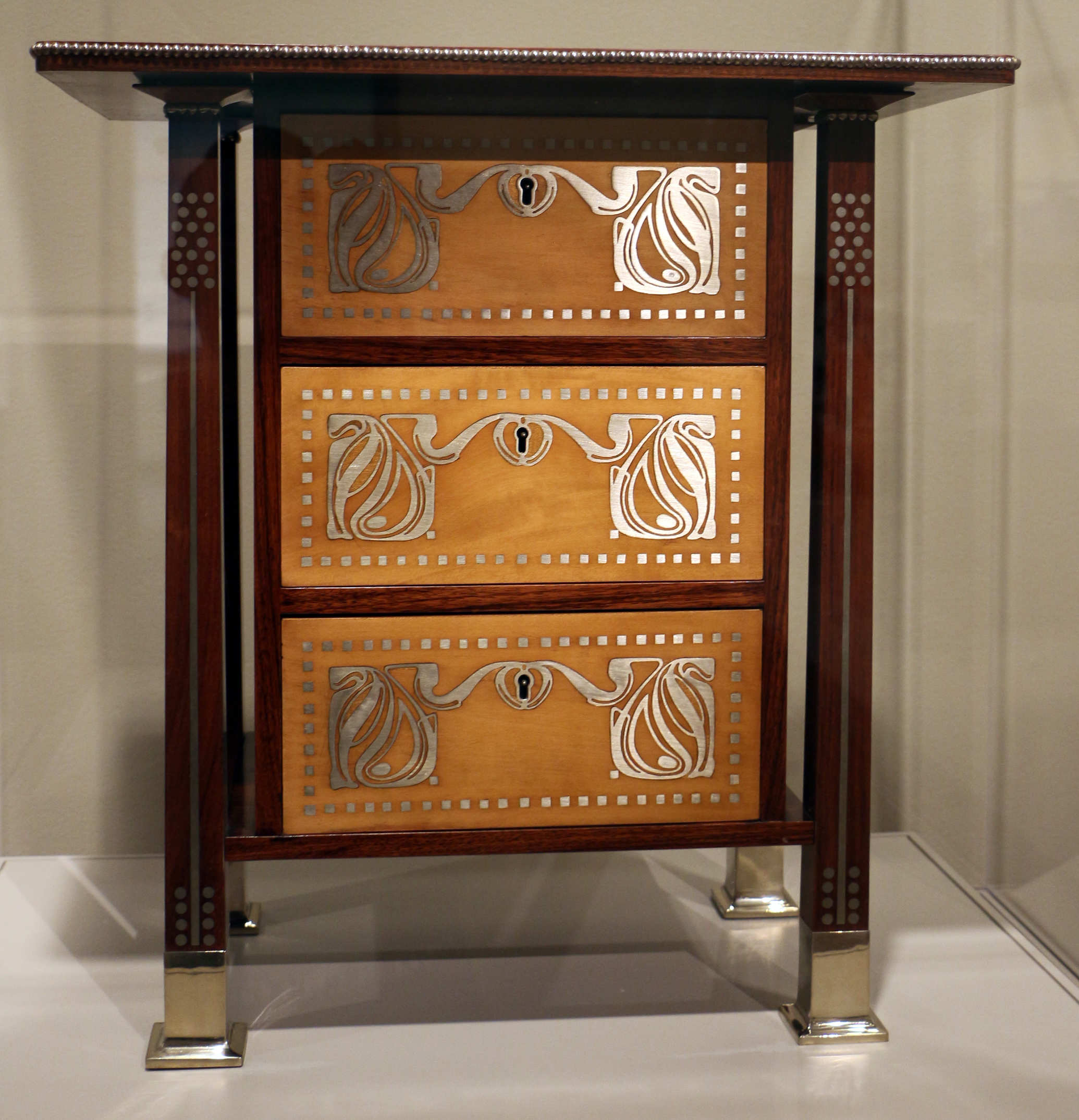
Cabinet for photographs circa 1902 by Josef Hoffmann

Josef Hoffmann wrote in a 1928 retrospective on the 25th anniversary of the Workshop that:

"The Wiener Werkstatte... is an undertaking that furthers and nurtures all artistic and qualitative endeavors in the field of modern craftsmanship."

The use of structured ornamentation was popularized by Josef Hoffmann and Koloman Moser. Josef Hoffman asserted in 1928 that:

"Our main achievement has been to give practical and appropriate forms to all objects and then to make these unique and valuable through pleasing proportions and harmonious shapes. The materials, the tools, and sometimes the machine are our only means of expression. We do not dictate to an artist, but seek only to encourage him to follow his own intuition and develop his creative power."

== Production ==
Most of the objects produced in the Wiener Werkstatte were stamped with a number of different marks: the trademark of the Wiener Werkstatte, the monogram of the designer and that of the craftsman, who created it. The Wiener Werkstatte had about 100 employees in 1905, of whom 37 were masters of their trade.

The seat of the venture was in Neustiftgasse 32–34, where a new building was adapted to their requirements. Eventually the project exhausted Wärndorfer's fortune. The circle of customers of the Wiener Werkstatte and Josef Hoffmann mainly consisted of artists and Jewish upper middle class supporters of the Austro-Hungarian Empire. Several branches of the workshop were opened in Karlsbad 1909, Marienbad, Zürich 1916–1917, New York 1922, Berlin 1929.

In architectural commissions such as the Sanatorium Purkersdorf and the Stoclet Palace in Brussels, the Wiener Werkstätte was able to realize its ideal of the Gesamtkunstwerk (total artwork), a coordinated environment in which everything down to the last detail was consciously designed as an integral part of the whole project.

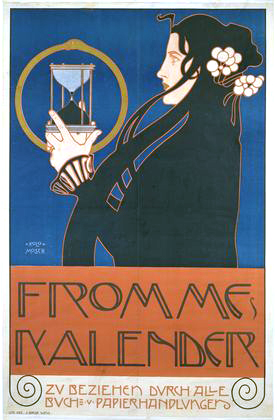
Poster for 'Frommes Kalender' 1899, colour lithograph by Koloman Moser

For several years, beginning in 1904, the Wiener Werkstätte had its own carpentry workshop, though only a few pieces of furniture were made there. Josef Hoffmann designed a furniture line noted for its simple forms for the firm of Jacob & Josef Kohn. Most of the furniture, known as Wiener Werkstätte Furniture, was made by cabinet-makers such as Portois & Fix, Johann Soulek, Anton Herrgesell, Anton Pospisil, Friedrich Otto Schmidt and Johann Niedermoser. Some historians now believe that there are no existing original products of the Wiener Werkstätte Furniture division.

From 1905, the Wiener Werkstatte produced handpainted and printed silks. The Backhausen firm was responsible for the machine-printed and woven textiles. In 1907, the Wiener Werkstätte took over distribution for the Wiener Keramik, a ceramics workshop headed by Michael Powolny and Berthold Löffler. And in the same year Moser, embittered by the financial squabbling, left the Wiener Werkstätte, which subsequently entered a new phase, both stylistically and economically.

== Expansion and End ==
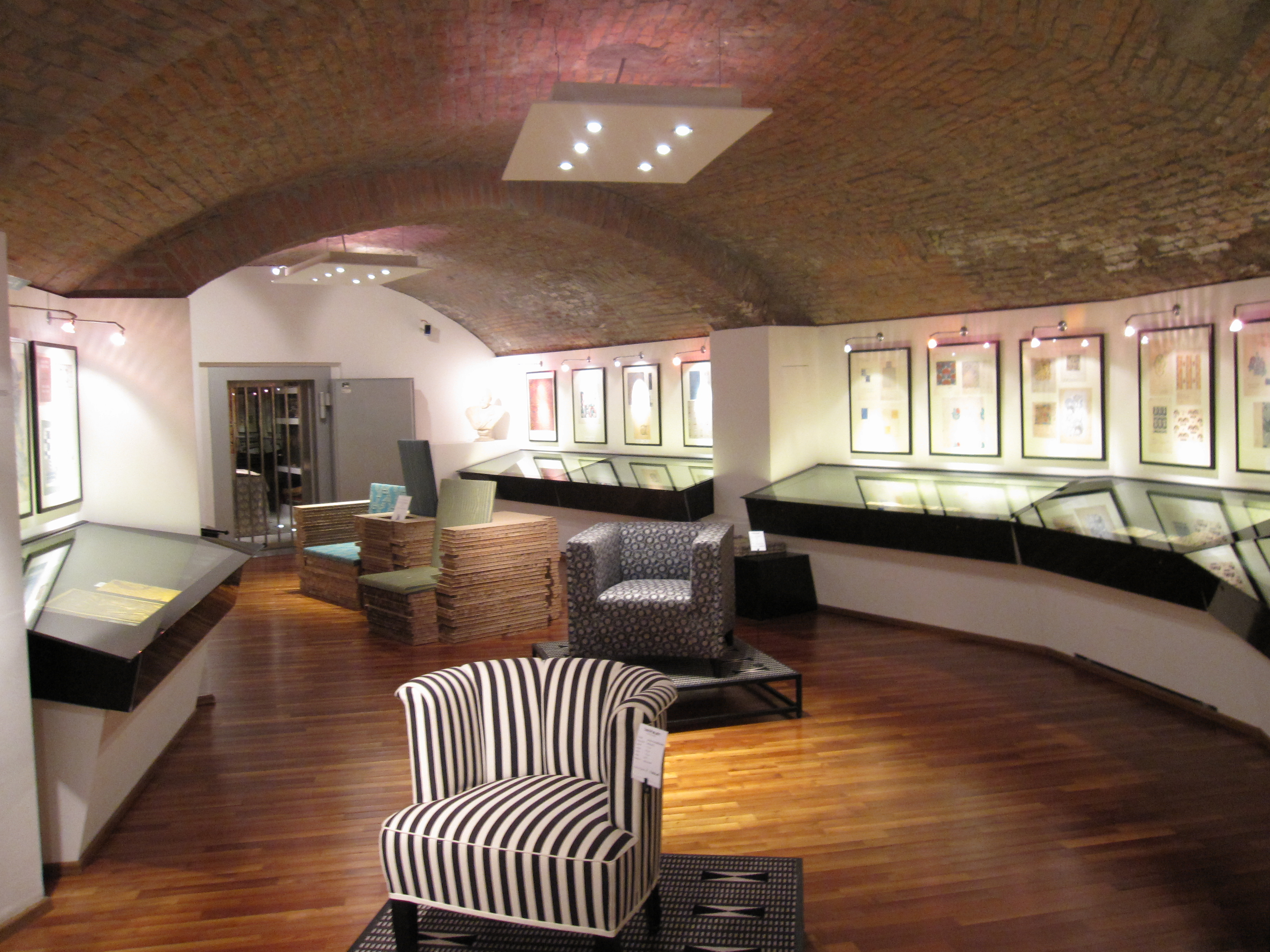
Wiener Werkstätte Museum at the textile company Backhausen in Vienna (2009)

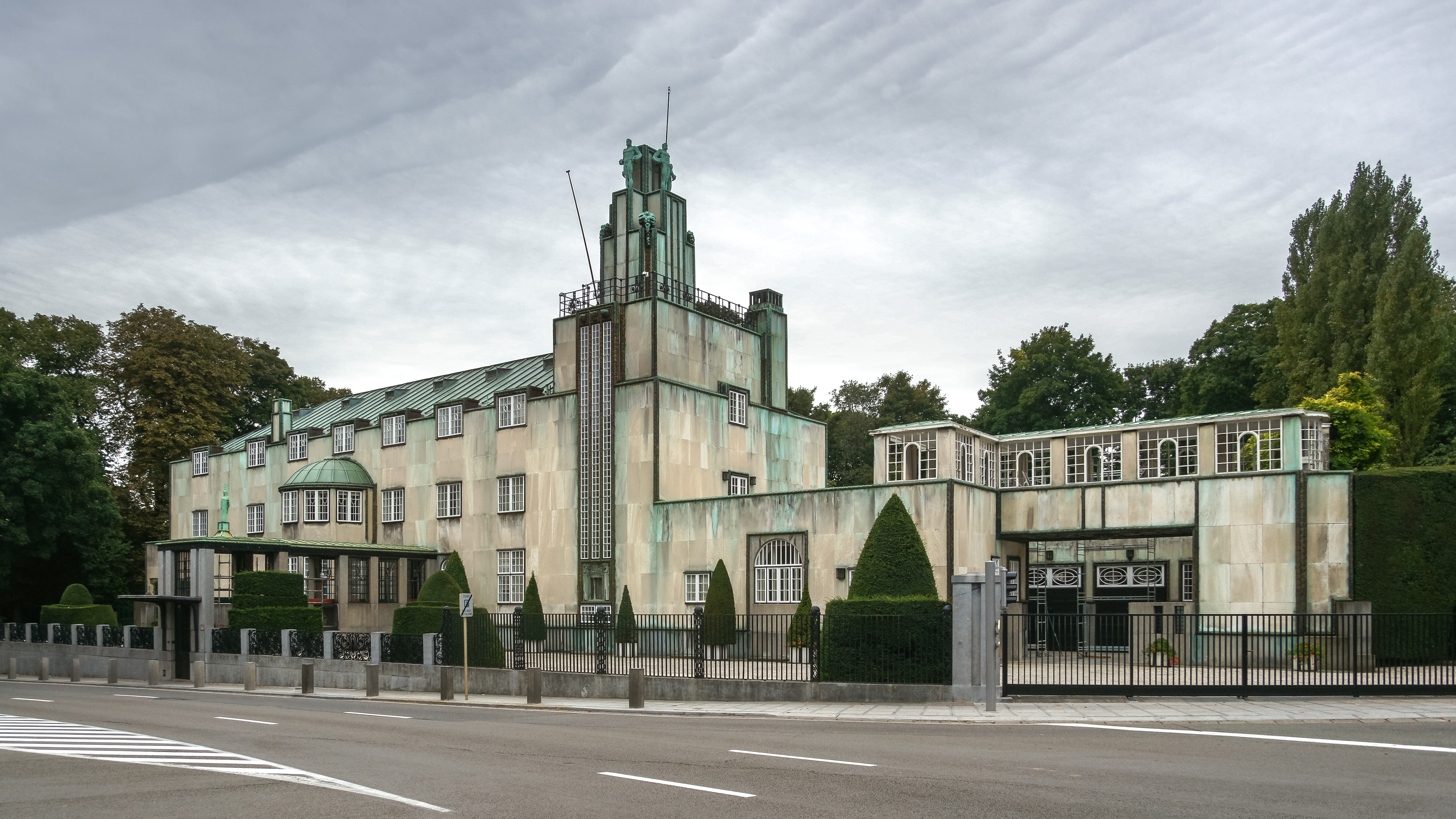
Stoclet Palace in Brussels, a Gesamtkunstwerk example of the Wiener Werkstätte

The founding of textile and fashion divisions in 1909 and 1910 brought a further shift in the Wiener Werkstätte's emphasis. After a close brush with bankruptcy in 1913, Wärndorfer left for America and the following year Otto Primavesi, a banker from Moravia, took over as chief financier and patron.

During and immediately following the First World War the Wiener Werkstatte was influenced by a new generation of artists and craftsmen, especially Dagobert Peche, who became creative director in 1915, and the director of the Zürich branch in 1917. Peche's playfully theatrical aesthetic reimagined decorative motifs of the Baroque and Rococo in a modern way.

After the war, material shortages encouraged experimentation with cheaper, less durable materials such as wood, ceramics and papier-mâché. One of the ceramics contributors was Walter Bosse.

At the beginning of the 1920s, Philipp Hausler attempted to eliminate the "bad habits" and "extravagances" which devoured so much money by broadening the workshop's base. The WW artists, however, insisted upon their accustomed exclusivity, and Hausler left in 1925." The shift in clientele that occurred after the commission of Stoclet Palace brought the Wiener Werkstätte away from the original hopes of creating accessible pieces of art. The creation of these houses with minimal financial restraint created an elite clientele that funded the WW for the rest of its history.

Attempts to expand the workshop's scope—adding such items as wallpaper to its limited program of industrial licenses, and establishing branches in Berlin, New York and Zurich—were not particularly successful. The Werkstätte's financial situation grew desperate due to the effects of the war and the onset of the worldwide Depression in 1929. In the 1932 it was compelled to declare bankruptcy and closed.

== Legacy ==
With its avant-garde, artistic, yet timeless designs, the Wiener-Werkstaette-Stil influenced generations of architects and designers in the 20th century. The Bauhaus movement in Germany, Art Deco in America from 1920 to 1940, Scandinavian design from 1940 to 1960 (see for example Arne Jacobsen), as well as Italian design (see Mario Bellini) between 1960 and 1980, were all strongly influenced by the Wiener Werkstätte. The Bauhaus movement continued Wiener Werkstätte's emphasis on geometric shapes and simplistic design, and relied on many of the founding principles that Hoffmann and Moser had hoped the Wiener Werkstätte including its focus on mass production through the use of affordable materials and simplistic designs.

A work considered representative of the Wiener Werkstätte's design is the Stoclet Palace in Brussels, which was designed as a Gesamtkunstwerk of the company Wiener Werkstätte. In 2009 it was declared a UNESCO World Heritage site and a digital twin will guide any future maintenance work.

The fashion accessory designs of Dagobert Peche have endured and detached from the Gesamtkunstwerk to be carried around in public.

The chocolate company Altmann & Kühne uses many of the designs of the company for its chocolate boxes, as does Demel.

In 2026, an exhibit known as "Modernity and Opulence: Women of the Wiener Werkstätte" was opened at The Jewish Museum in New York City, primarily featuring Vally Wieselthier and Felice Rix-Ueno, among others.

== See also ==
- Vienna Secession
