= David Wiseman =

American artist and designer (born 1981)

- Born: September 11, 1981 (age 44); Pasadena, California, U.S.
- Education: Rhode Island School of Design
- Known for: Sculptural chandeliers, bronze furniture, and immersive porcelain and plaster ceiling installations
- Style: Decorative arts, art, craft
- Website: http://www.dwiseman.com/

David Wiseman (born September 11, 1981 in Pasadena, California) is an American artist and designer whose work is known for its detailed craftsmanship and dialogue with traditional filigree decorative arts. His work spans from bronze filigree patterned screens and gates to bronze and terrazzo furniture, and from animal sculptures to porcelain vases.

== About ==
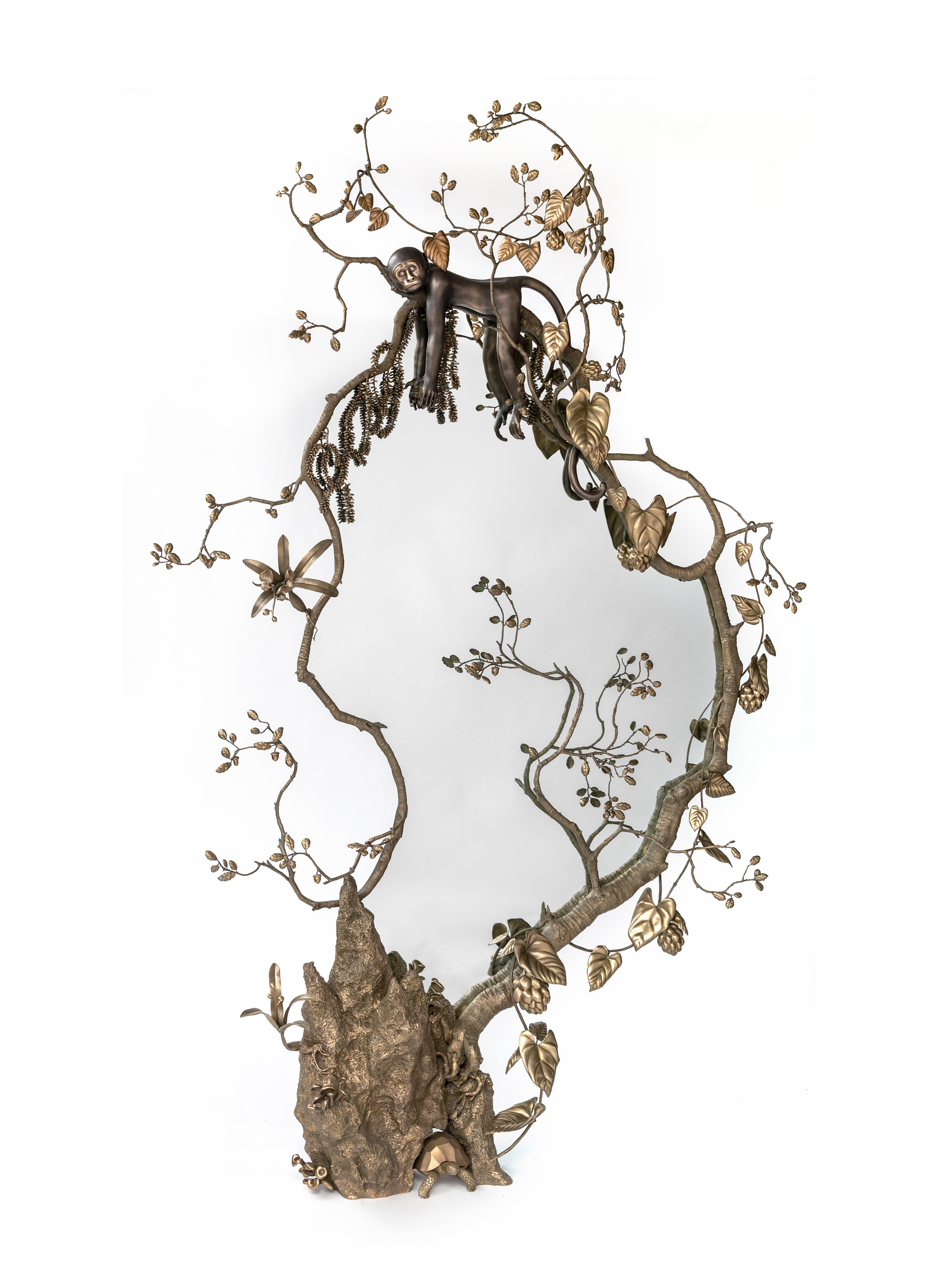
David Wiseman, Lost Valley Mirror, 2019, courtesy of Wiseman Studio

Wiseman's work ranges from expansive site-specific installations to furniture and sculptural lighting.

Wiseman credits his awe for nature as his motivating inspiration: "I have always been drawn to nature in my work," he says. "And within the natural world, magnificent patterns abound, from crystalline structures to honeycombs, and cell formations to ocean swells."

Admiration for designers who were part of the Vienna Secession, like Dagobert Peche and Josef Hoffman; the French artist duo Les Lalanne; as well as traditional patterns from India, France, Korea, and Japan are a large part of Wiseman’s inspiration. “A century ago artists found a way to make ornament relevant to contemporary life, before postwar standardization wiped it away,” Wiseman says. “I’d like to make it relevant again.”

== Career ==
Wiseman received his BFA degree in Furniture Design from the Rhode Island School of Design in 2003.

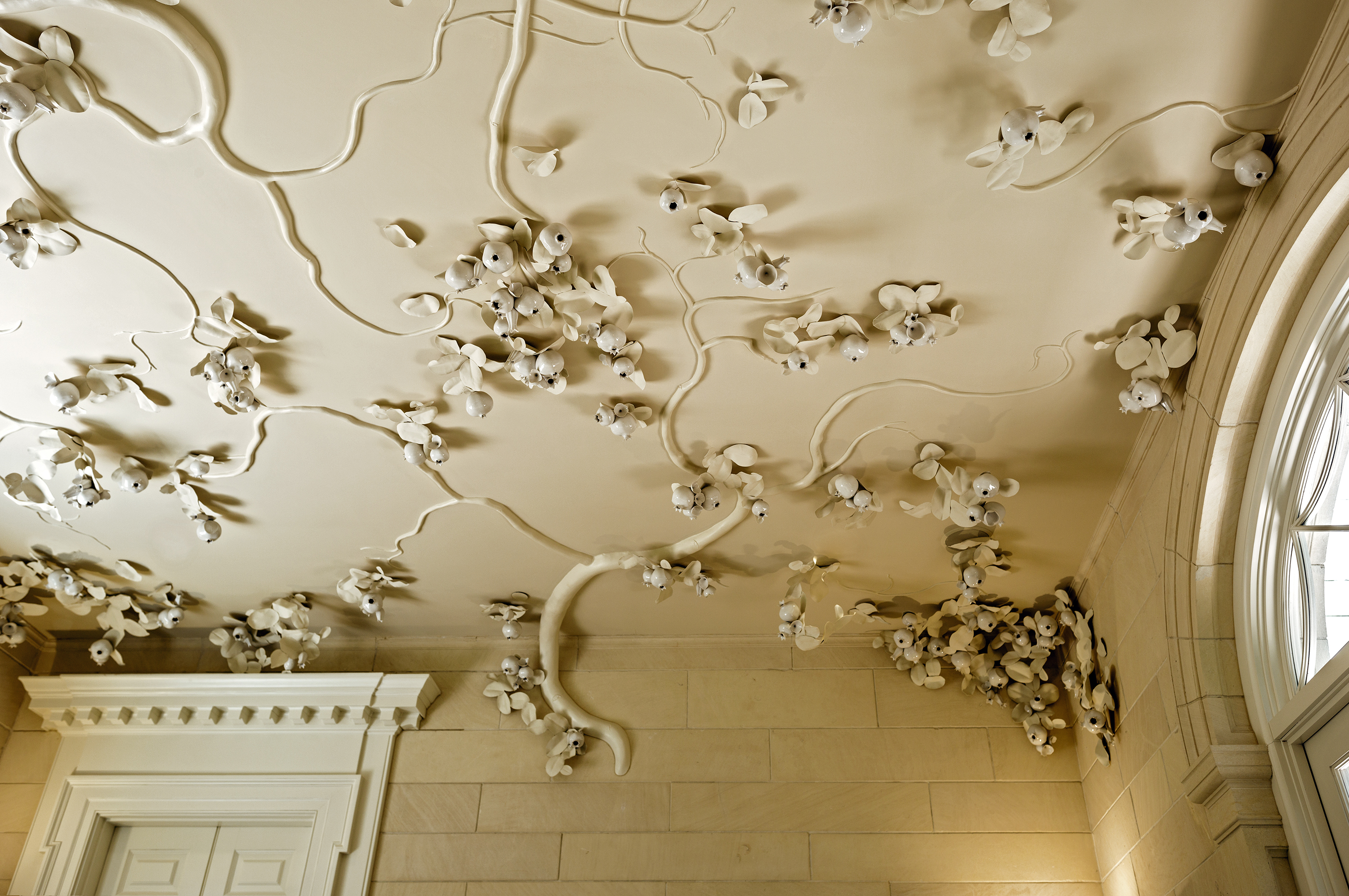
David Wiseman, Cielo de las Granadas, Installation, 2007, courtesy of Wiseman Studio

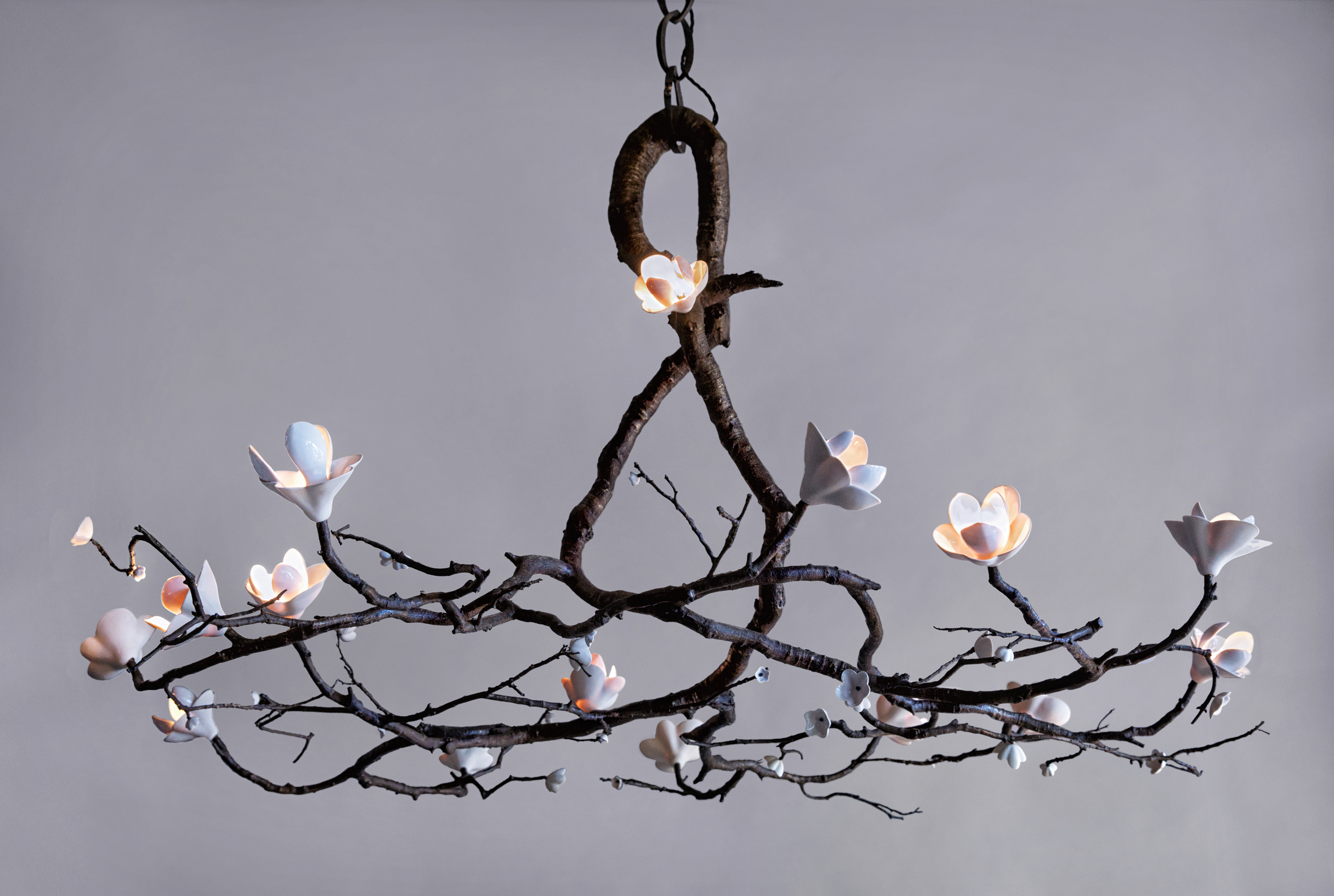
David Wiseman, Radial Branch Chandelier, 2016, courtesy of Wiseman Studio

While still in school, Wiseman began selling his wall-mounted Deer Hat Hanger in Los Angeles and New York boutiques. His senior thesis, titled Wall Forest, included the deer heads alongside a selection of resin-cast tree branches that appeared to emerge from the walls, and in 2007 was featured in DAAB Books' compendium Wall Design.

In 2005, after a brief stint in New York, Wiseman returned to Los Angeles where he created his first porcelain and plaster ceiling installation in a private residence in Hancock Park, Los Angeles. This ceiling was commissioned by the clients’ decorator, Rodman Primack formerly Director of Design Miami, with whom Wiseman has maintained a close working relationship. Wiseman describes his subsequent exploration into creating bespoke ceiling installations as “porcelain and plaster canopies of branches—trees that looked like they were emerging through the surface of the wall. Those branches evolved into chandeliers, and that led to a whole other body of work.” From this initial project, he has developed a studio, creating lighting, sculpture, and furniture.

== Studio ==
In 2017, together with his brother, Ari Wiseman, the former Deputy Director of the Solomon R. Guggenheim Foundation founded Wiseman Studio.

== Artworks and exhibitions ==
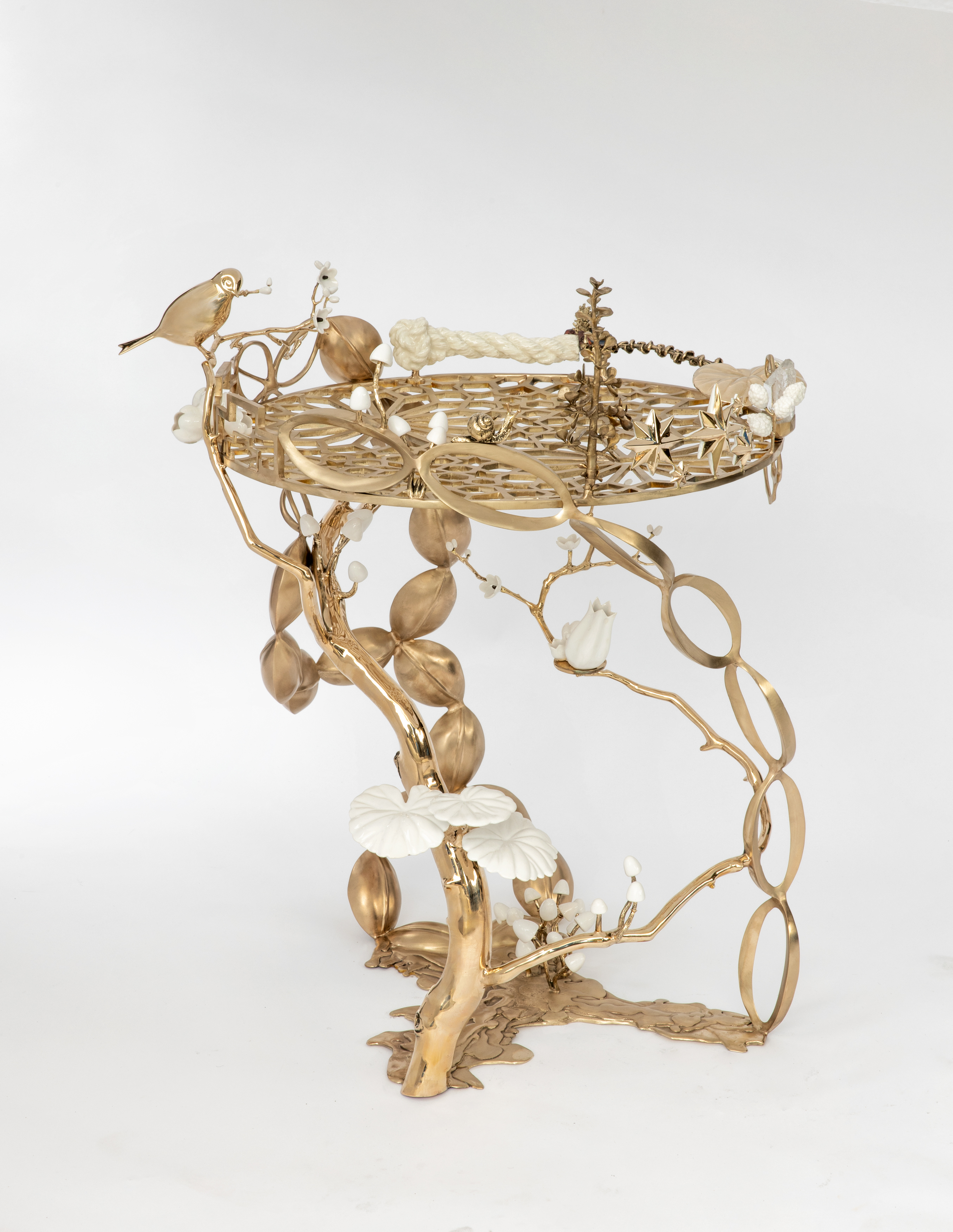
David Wiseman, Bowerbird Table, 2019, courtesy of Wiseman Studio

Wiseman’s work was institutionally recognized in 2006, with the inclusion of his “Cherry Blossom Canopy” installation at the Cooper-Hewitt Museum’s National Design Triennial, Design Life Now. In 2008, Wiseman began exhibiting with R & Company, a Manhattan-based design gallery representing contemporary and historical designers, where his first two solo shows were held - David Wiseman in 2012, and Wilderness and Ornament in 2015.

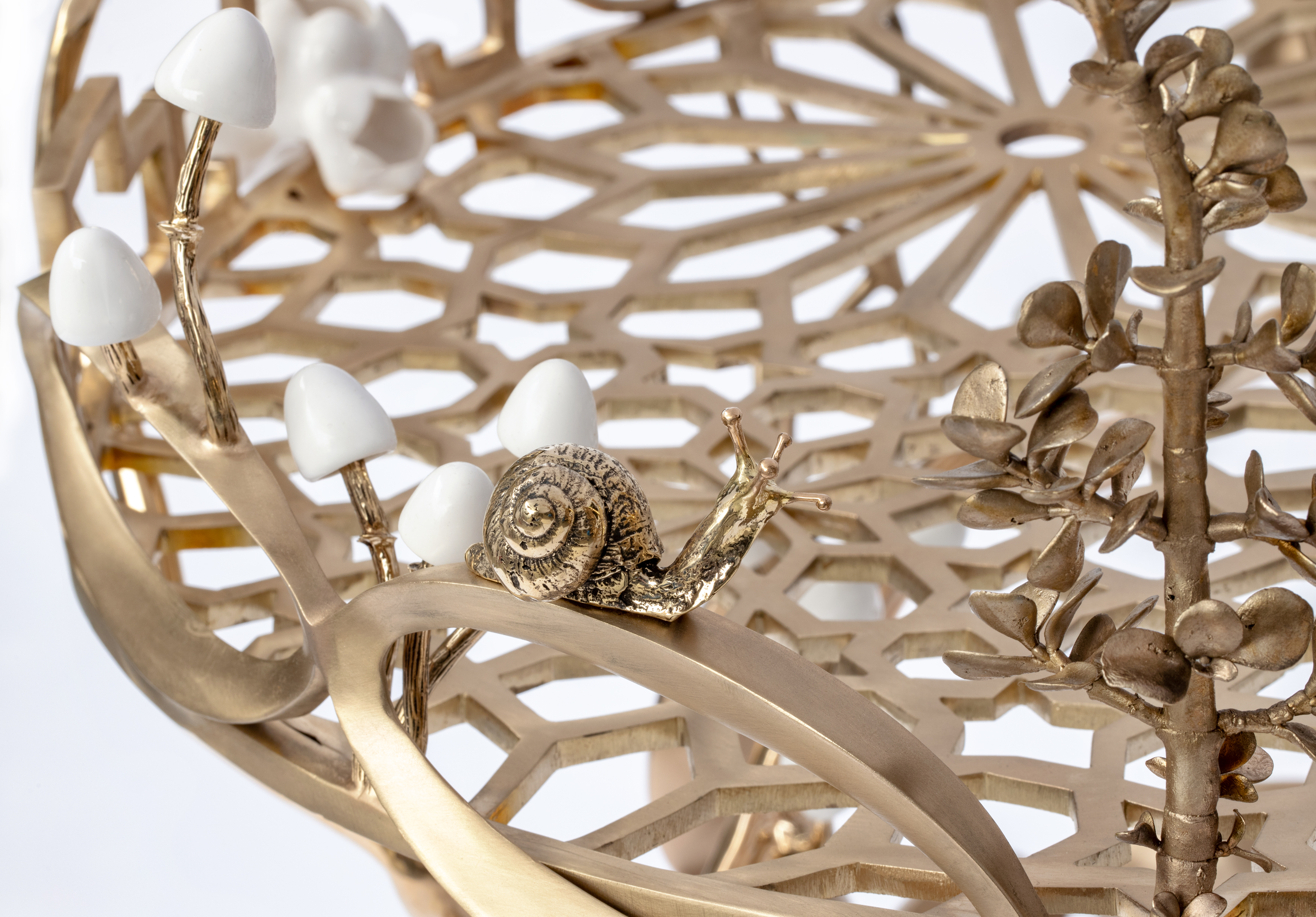
David Wiseman, Bowerbird Table (detail), 2019, courtesy of Wiseman Studio

In 2019, Kasmin Gallery (New York, New York) presented a solo exhibition of Wiseman’s work, titled Plants, Minerals, and Animals, which featured works reflecting his fascination with the natural world, and global decorative arts traditions. The exhibition presented bronze and terrazzo furniture, a mirror, limited edition wallpaper, and sculptural chandeliers.

His work has been acquired by Corning Museum of Glass (Corning, NY), Los Angeles County Museum of Art (Los Angeles, CA), the Rhode Island School of Design Museum (Providence, RI), and Wunsch Americana Foundation (New York, NY). In addition to the 2006 Design Triennial at the Cooper-Hewitt, Wiseman's work was exhibited in 2014 at the Bernardaud Foundation in Limoges, France.

More recently, his work was shown at international art and design fairs such as ART021 (Shanghai), Design Miami (Miami and Basel, Switzerland), FOG Art and Design (San Francisco), The Salon Art+Design (New York City), Collective Design Fair (New York City), and Zona Maco (Mexico City), and has been displayed in collaborative exhibitions at Friedman Benda and Gallery Seomi (Seoul).

== Notable projects ==
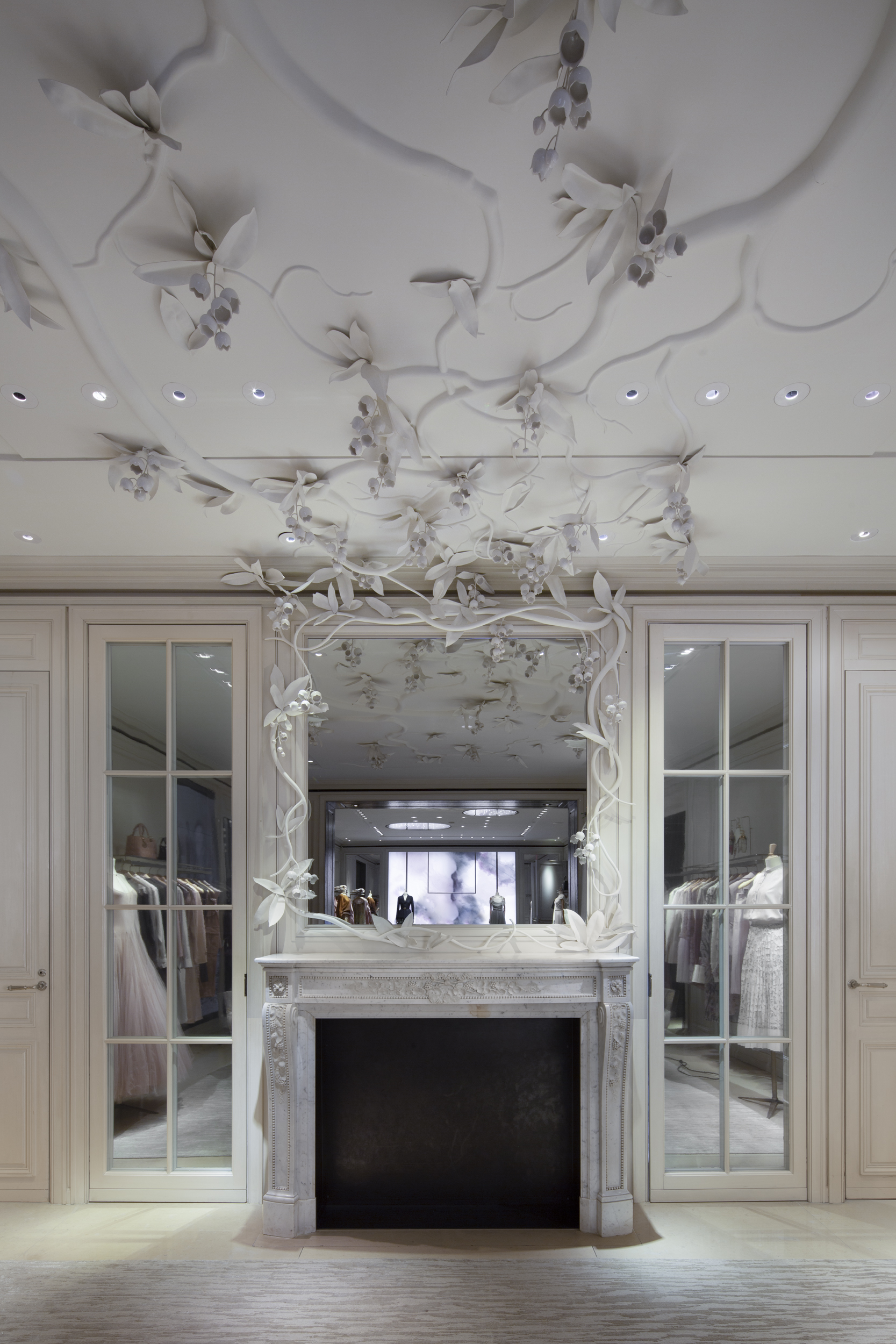
David Wiseman, Lily of the Valley Mirror and Ceiling for Dior, Installation, 2011, courtesy of Wiseman Studio

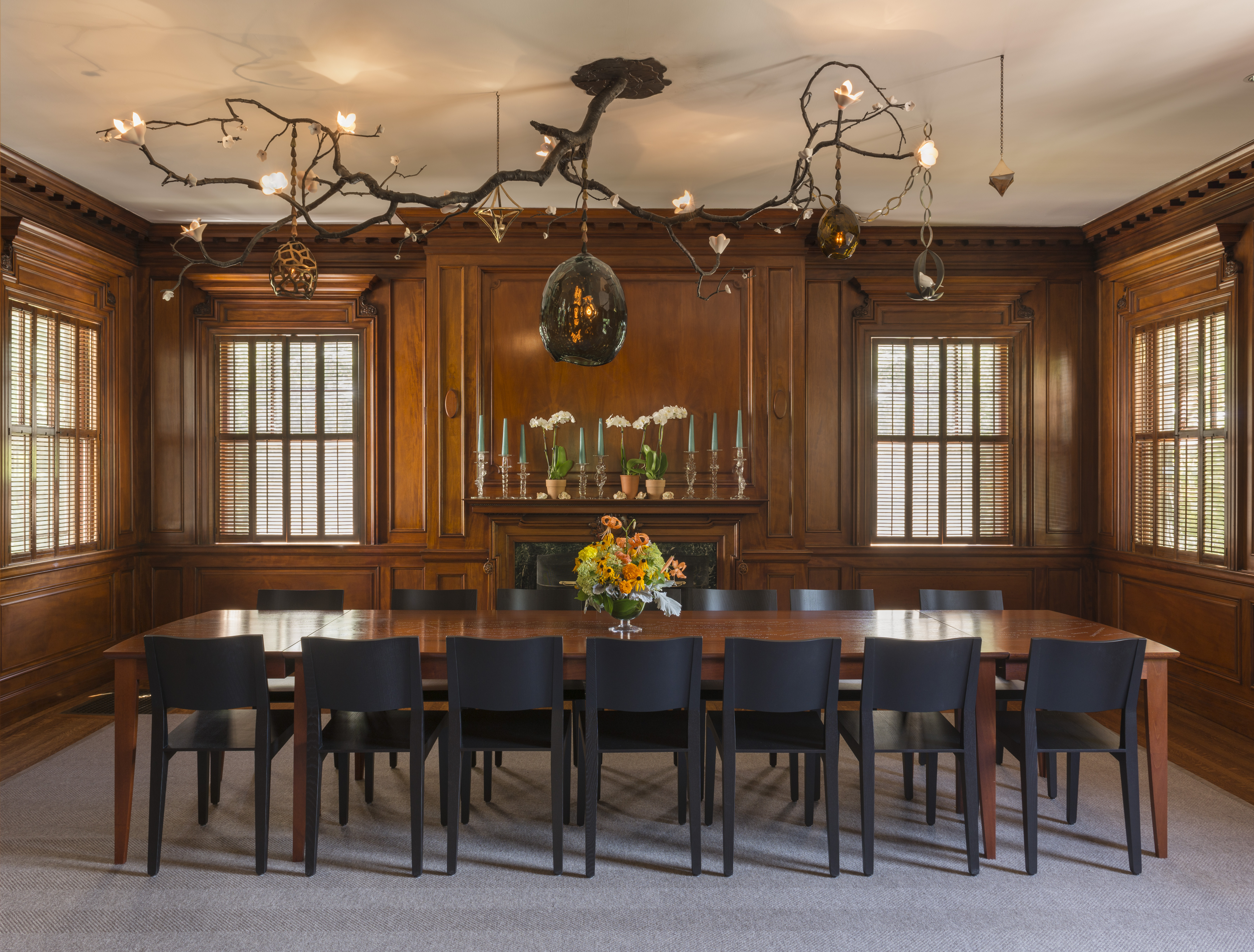
David Wiseman, Collage Chandelier for Rhode Island School of Design, 2014, courtesy of Wiseman Studio

Much of Wiseman’s work consists of private commissions for residences across the country and internationally. In 2013, Wiseman's Branch Illuminated Sculpture was chosen for U.S Embassy in Madrid, Spain, by designer Michael S. Smith, as part of the Art in Embassies program. For a wall installation in a private residence from 2010, he worked closely with a family to develop a site-specific installation that referenced their history - a literal family tree represented by blossoming wisteria vines twining around a linden tree, and crowned by a porcelain owl. In 2010, commissioned by decorator Peter Marino, he created a signature porcelain Lily of the Valley vine installation for Dior flagship stores in New York, Shanghai, and Tokyo.

As a notable alumnus, Wiseman was invited to create a site-specific illuminated sculptural installation in the dining room of the President's residence at Rhode Island School of Design and has completed numerous other chandelier installations worldwide.

== Collaborations ==
=== Glacier collection ===
In 2006, Wiseman teamed up with Bohemian glass artisans at Artel Glass in Prague to create a series of faceted blown-crystal pieces. The Glacier collection includes small vodka glasses, whiskey tumblers, sconces, vases, and hanging pendant lamps. Artel sells these items from their store in Prague, and Wiseman’s studio sources them for inclusion in his Collage Chandeliers and other pieces.

=== Scent pieces ===
Wiseman collaborated with Haley Alexander Van Oosten, an LA-based scent designer and founder of artisan perfumery L’Oeil du Vert, to create a scent-diffusing objet d'art. Together, they also created a spherical, pebble-textured gold- or silver-plated box containing “gems” of scent-soaked ebony. Wiseman created the Lost Valley Grotto in which the monkey holds out his hand which serves as a well for a custom fragrance made with essential oil.

=== Rugs ===
In 2014, Milan-based rug manufacturer Amini and R & Company put together a collaboration between artists represented by the gallery and artisan Tibetan weavers working from Kathmandu, Nepal. Wiseman’s original rug design was based on his bronze Garden Gate Doors and integrated many of his signature patterns and motifs, including branches and a small bird, but Wiseman says that “after spending some time with [the weavers] and visiting their spiritual places, I integrated some of their patterns. The clouds on the bottom right corner of the rug appear on their temples and textiles.” The limited-edition rugs, in two colorways of indigo and gold, and Delftware-inspired blue and white, debuted at Design Miami in December 2014. In 2017, Wiseman created another Paradise Rug as part of the same collaboration, which was an extra-large asymmetrical organically shaped carpet with animal and bird motifs amongst rivers and stones in a blue and grey palette.

=== Huevos de Los Angeles ===
In 2014, Wiseman collaborated with friend and fellow RISD grad Adam Silverman, former director of Heath Ceramics, to begin their ongoing series, Huevos de Los Angeles. The collaboration to date has consisted of a series of Silverman’s self-described “'lumpy, maybe beautiful” ceramic eggs interacting with Wiseman’s customized bronze elements, in what the artists term “transformations of Fabergé eggs. Several of the eggs are wrapped in Wiseman’s Islamic jali inspired tracery pattern, while holes in the surface of another egg cradle snugly-nestled, highly polished studs of bronze.

The first pair of the series was exhibited at Wallpaper* magazine’s Handmade installation at Salone del Mobile in Milan. They were later acquired by the Rhode Island School of Design Museum.

=== Dior Lady Art project ===
December, 2018. After collaborating with the House by sculpting lily-of-the-valley ceilings and mirrors for the boutiques in Shanghai, Tokyo and New York, he conceived two creations as part of the Dior Lady Art project. The large bag was made of hand cut leather that approximated his bronze collage patterned screens. A medium bag had Dior gray lambskin stitched with a mix of cannage and floral patterns, and embellished the charms with lily-of-the-valley buds in porcelain-effect metal inspired by Monsieur Dior's favorite flower and Wiseman's signature ceilings.

KILLSPENCER x David Wiseman Fletcher Briefcase

Partnering with longtime friend and industrial designer Spencer Nikosey of KILLSPENCER, Wiseman co-created the Fletcher Briefcase, a limited-edition briefcase made of bull hide leather and a top handle made of cast bronze and inlaid terrazzo that features petrified wood. Released April 2020.

== Selected press ==
Wiseman’s work has been featured in The New York Times, T Magazine, The Wall Street Journal, Architectural Digest, The Financial Times, LA Times, Town and Country, 1st Dibs, Departures magazine, Artsy, the Huffington Post, The Robb Report, among others.

== Bibliography ==
- David Wiseman (2020), Rizzoli Electa, ISBN 978-0-8478-6490-4
- Interiors: The Greatest Rooms of the Century (2019), Phaidon Press Limited, ISBN 978-07148-7821-8
- Toromanoff, Agata. Vases: 250 State-of-the-Art Designs (2019), Thames & Hudson, ISBN 978-0-500-02124-8
- Peter Marino: Art and Architecture (2016), Phaidon Press Inc., ISBN 978-0714871288
- David Wiseman (2012), R 20th Century Gallery and Whitehaus Media, ISBN 978-0-9704608-6-8
- Fragiles: Porcelain, Glass and Ceramics (2008), S. Grill, R. Klanten, S. Ehmann
- Wiseman was also featured in the book Wall Design, published by DAAB Books.
