= Gisela Falke von Lilienstein =

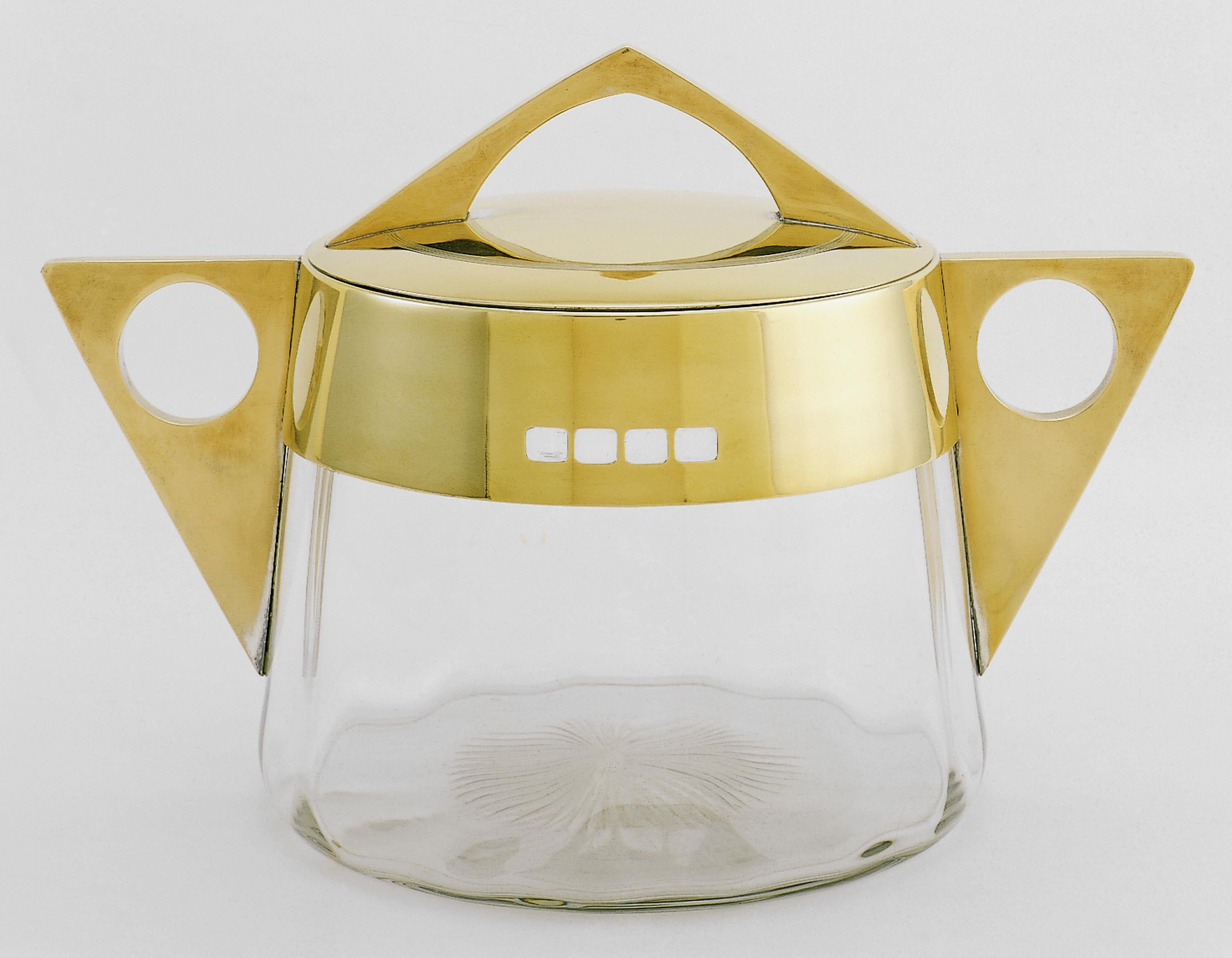
Von Lilienstein Covered Tureen

Gisela Falke Von Lilienstein (born 1871; death date unknown) was an Austrian designer who designed ceramics, glassware, jewelry, lighting, and furniture for the Wiener Werkstätte. Her work was exhibited in Vienna Secessionist exhibitions and international expositions.

== Education ==
Falke von Lilienstein studied at the Vienna Kunstgewerbeschule (School of Applied Art) from 1895-1904 with Josef Hoffman and others.

== Work ==
Falke von Lilienstein's work was shown as part of the Exposition Universelle (1900); her wares — along with those by other artists — were displayed in a room designed by Josef Hoffmann, as if in a private home, rather than a gallery or museum setting.

Falk Von Lilienstein, along with four women (Marietta Peyfuss, Jutta Sika, Therese Trethan and Else Unger) and five male colleagues, founded the exhibiting group Wiener Kunst im Hause (Viennese Art in the Home) in 1901. Her and her colleagues' work in this group was well received by supporters of the modern movement in design. The exhibitions were notes for the "simple practicality of their designs" as well as their "feminine creativity." The exhibitions included porcelain coffee sets and embroidered table linens among other designs, which evoked traditional Austrian Folk art.

Journalists, including Berta Zuckerkandl, praised their designs for ceramics, metalwork, textiles, furnishings and interiors in publications such as Das Interieur, Wiener Mode and Dokumente der Frauen. Falk Von Lilienstein also worked at the E. Bakalovitz & Söhne shop.

== Sources ==
- Die Kunst. München: F. Bruckmann. vol. 10 (1904).
- Louisiana Purchase Exposition. 1904. Official catalogue of exhibitors. Universal exposition, St. Louis, U.S.A. 1904. Division of exhibits ... Department A. Education. St. Louis: for the Committee on Press and Publicity, by the Official Catalogue Co. OCLC 25216592
- Neuwirth, Waltraud. Österreichische Keramik des Jugendstils, München: Prestel, 1973. OCLC 1476848.
- Wien um 1900: Kunst und Kultur. Wien: C. Brandstätter, 1985.
