= Judith Eisler =

American artist

- Born: 1962 (age 63–64); Newark, NJ

Judith Eisler (born 1962, Newark, NJ) is an artist based in Vienna, Austria and Warren, CT.

Movie Lights 3, oil on canvas, 183 x 244 cm, 2014. Original painting by Judith Eisler.

Eisler received her BFA from Cornell University in 1984. She gathers source imagery for her paintings from watching films and photographing stills from the footage. Her works typically have glossy surfaces and feature blurred imagery and light defined as substance. Descended from Pop art and Photorealism, her fluid paint-handling incorporates elements of James Rosenquist’s billboard fuzziness and Marilyn Minter’s bracing aggressiveness. Since 2009, Eisler has been a professor of painting at the University of Applied Arts Vienna (Die Angewandte), Austria.

== Collections ==
- Smithsonian American Art Museum
- The National Museum for Popular Music, Norway

== Awards ==
2002 - John Simon Guggenheim Fellowship

== Literature ==
- Guyton, Wade, "Obscuring the Icon". Interview Magazine, March 4, 2015.
- Zhong, Fan, "Slow Motion". W Magazine, February 19, 2015.
- Steller, Jessica, "Judith Eisler: Elusive Elements of Light and Motion". Flatt Features, February, 2015.
- Garner, Ashley, "Judith Eisler: Interview". Monrowe, November 2, 2015.
- Hofleitner, Johanna, "Judith Eisler: Die Galerie als Kino". Die Presse, December 1, 2012.
