= Stylianos Schicho =

Austrian artist

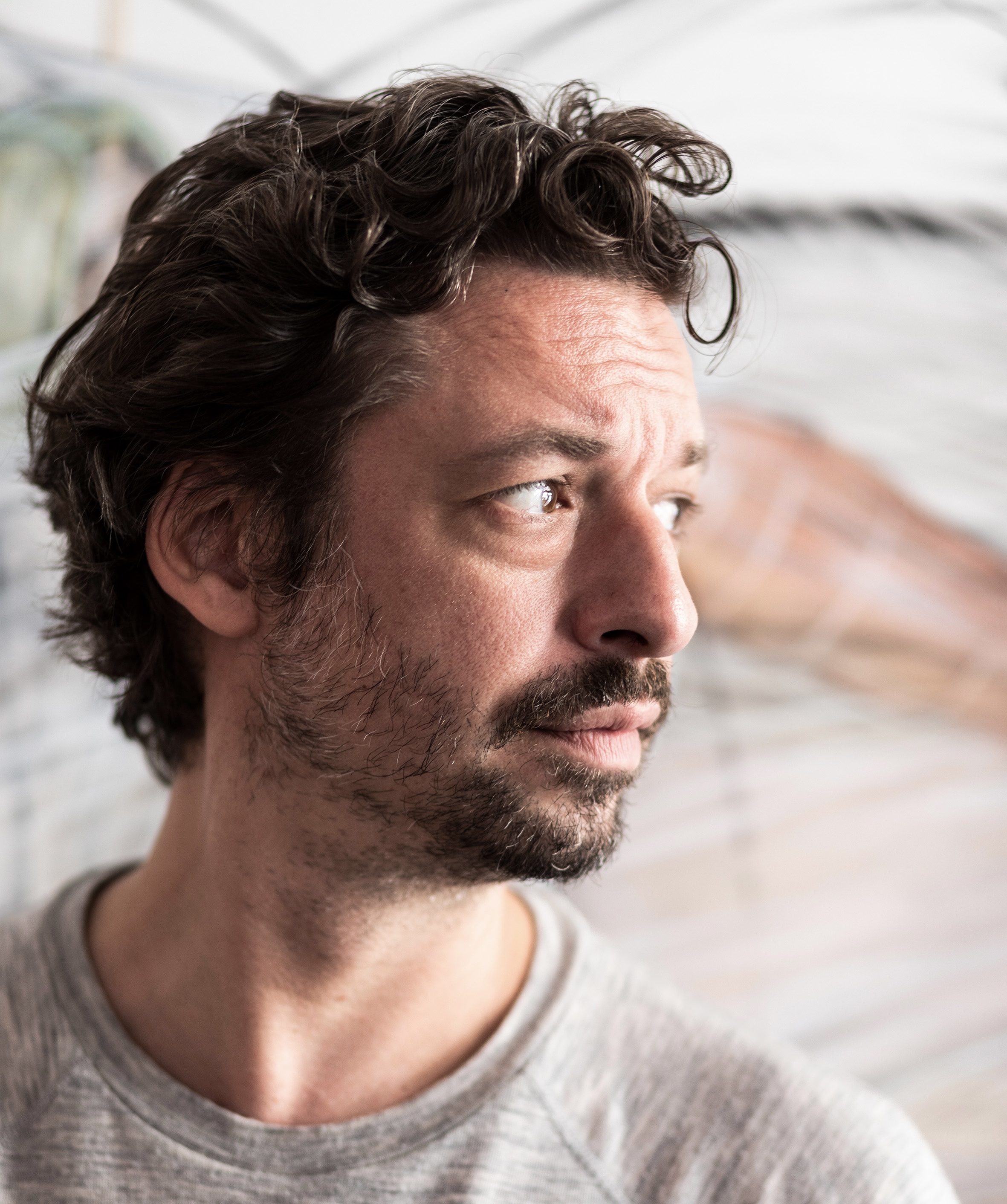
- Stylianos Schicho, photo: Wolfgang Thaler
- Born: 1977 (age 48–49); Vienna, Austria
- Education: University of Applied Arts Vienna, Diploma with Distinction (2005)
- Known for: Large-scale figurative painting
- Movement: Figurative painting
- Website: stylianosschicho.com

Stylianos Schicho (born 1977 in Vienna) is an Austrian painter who lives and works in Vienna. He studied painting and graphic art at the University of Applied Arts Vienna from 1998 to 2005 in the master class of Professor Wolfgang Herzig, graduating with a Diploma with Distinction. His work is held in public collections including the Albertina, Vienna, the Leopold Museum Vienna, and the Wien Museum (MUSA).

== Life ==
In 1996 Schicho completed his Matura at BORG Hegelgasse 14 in Vienna. He subsequently studied law at the University of Vienna for two years before enrolling in 1998 in the painting and graphic art programme at the University of Applied Arts Vienna in the master class of Professor Wolfgang Herzig. He graduated with a Diploma with Distinction in 2005.

In 2008 he undertook a studio residency at the Baumwollspinnerei in Leipzig as part of the Pilotenküche programme. He has also participated in artist symposia in Kazakhstan and the Caucasus region, and completed a three-month working residency in Miami as part of the C-Collection Residency.

== Work ==
Schicho works primarily with charcoal and translucent acrylic paint on canvas, often at large format. His practice also encompasses drawings and ceramic works.

Curator Hartwig Knack, writing for Schicho's 2006 solo exhibition at Kunsthalle Krems, described the work as exploring "observation and surveillance spaces in which cameras are positioned to watch and monitor".

Critic Anina Valle Thiele, writing in the Luxembourg weekly woxx in 2014, described being-observed as running "like a red thread" through Schicho's work, and characterised the paintings as posing the question "Who is spying on whom?".

Critic Luc Caregari, writing in woxx in 2012, placed Schicho's work within a tradition of expressionist-political painting since the 1920s, noting references in the paintings to smartphones and technical devices as symbols of surveillance and information overload.

At the 2016 Dallas Art Fair, art critic Eileen Kinsella writing for Artnet described Schicho's multi-panel work Hopscotch 2 as "arresting".

Schicho described his working process in a 2015 exhibition text as "freezing a seen moment" — taking a moment home, breaking it apart and reassembling it according to his own criteria. In a 2020 interview he stated: "It is alarming for me to see my paintings becoming reality. Modern human life between closeness and distance, communication and interaction — these points were always at the centre of my work and have now become even more omnipresent."

== Awards and grants ==
- 2017: STRABAG Artaward International, Recognition Prize
- 2014: MEGABOARD ART WALLs, 1st Prize
- 2010: Young & Collecting Prize, Art Amsterdam / SNS REAAL Fonds (Stedelijk Museum Schiedam)
- 2009: Grand Prix, 1st Danube Biennale, Danubiana Meulensteen Art Museum, Bratislava
- 2007: Walter Koschatzky Kunstpreis, 2nd Place (mumok, Vienna)
- 2007: Art Prize of the City of Pöchlarn, 1st Prize
- 2004: Sophie and Emanuel Fohn Scholarship
- 2004: Art Prize of the City of Ternitz, 1st Prize

== Public and private collections (selection) ==
- Albertina, Vienna (Graphische Sammlung)
- Leopold Museum Vienna (Leopold Foundation)
- Wien Museum, MUSA
- Art Collection, University of Applied Arts Vienna
- Stedelijk Museum Schiedam (formerly SNS REAAL Fonds NOG Collection), Netherlands
- C-Collection, Liechtenstein
- The Granary – Melva Bucksbaum and Ray Learsy Collection, USA
- Museum Angerlehner, Thalheim/Wels, Austria
- ARTcollection STRABAG, Austria
- Artothek des Bundes (Federal Art Collection), Vienna
- Hilger Collection, Vienna

== Selected exhibitions ==
=== 2025/2026 ===
- The Spectated Spectator – gallery jenseits, Cincinnati, USA (solo)
- Choreography of Thoughts – Projektraum Lucas Cuturi, Vienna (solo)
- Käthe Schoenle / Stylianos Schicho – L.art Vienna (duo)

=== 2024 ===
- paper unlimited – museumkrems, Krems (group, museum)
- DUAL (Marcuse Hafner – Stylianos Schicho) – Boutique Romana, Vienna (duo)

=== 2023 ===
- Monika Kus-Picco / Stylianos Schicho – L.art Galerie, Vienna (duo)
- Freiluftkunst Wien – LED displays in Vienna public space

=== 2022 ===
- Stylianos Schicho: ZUGUNRUHE – Galerie Ernst Hilger, Vienna (solo)
- Stylianos Schicho – galeriekrems / museumkrems, Krems (solo)
- Roland Reiter / Stylianos Schicho – Benjamin Eck Projects, Munich (duo)

=== 2021 ===
- Stylianos Schicho: Waiting Games – Hilger NEXT, Vienna (solo)
- Nestless – Parallel Vienna / Hilger NEXT, Vienna (solo)
- (K)Ein Mensch ist eine Insel – Künstlerhaus Vienna (group, institution)

=== 2020 ===
- Stylianos Schicho – Brotfabrik Wien, Bildraum Studio, Artist-in-Residence (solo)
- Detour – Parallel Vienna (solo)

=== 2019 ===
- Trembling Traces (Stefan Zsaitsits & Stylianos Schicho) – stoerpunkt Gallery, Munich (duo)
- Eden – Loft8 Galerie, Vienna (solo)

=== 2018 ===
- Another Point of You – STRABAG Kunstforum, Vienna (solo)
- Aposematic Appeal – galerie GALERIE, Graz (solo)
- Mirror Mirror Mirror – Galerie Clairefontaine, Luxembourg (solo)

=== 2017 ===
- Aesthetics of Change (150 Years University of Applied Arts Vienna) – MAK (group, museum)
- Excentrifugal (Wendelin Pressl & Stylianos Schicho) – Salzamt Linz / Galerie im Traklhaus, Salzburg (duo)

=== 2016 ===
- Shortcut – Galerie Clairefontaine, Luxembourg (solo)
- Kunstfabrik Groß Sigharts, Austria (solo)
- Dallas Art Fair – 10 Hanover, London
- Option Project – Sotheby's, Vienna

=== 2015 ===
- Elevator Paintings – Loft 8, Vienna (solo)
- Freeze! – Wien Energie, Vienna (solo)
- Baed Art – Projektraum Lucas Cuturi, Vienna (solo)

=== 2014 ===
- In the Mean/Time – Galerie Clairefontaine, Luxembourg (solo)
- Figuration Between Dream and Reality – Museum Angerlehner, Thalheim (group, museum)
- 600 Mio. – Freunde und Komplizen – Künstlerhaus Vienna (group, institution)

=== 2013 ===
- Visual Soliloquies – Galerie Käthe Zwach, Schörfling am Attersee (solo)
- Mensbeeld – Galerie van Krimpen, Amsterdam

=== 2012 ===
- bLISSFULLY bURSTING bUBBLES – Lukas Feichtner Galerie, Vienna (solo)
- Stylianos Schicho Observed – Galerie Clairefontaine, Luxembourg (solo)
- The Monkey on My Back – Künstlerhaus Vienna (solo)

=== 2011 ===
- Public Fears – CAPe, Ettelbruck, Luxembourg (solo)
- schilderijen 2008–2011 van stylianos schicho – Galerie van Krimpen, Amsterdam (solo)
- The Wynwood Paintings – C-Collection Residency, Miami (solo)
- The Excitement Continues – Leopold Museum Vienna (group, museum)

=== 2010 ===
- Perspex People – Lukas Feichtner Galerie, Vienna (solo)
- PULSE Art Fair New York / Lukas Feichtner Galerie

=== 2009 ===
- For Security Reasons – Showroom MAMA, Rotterdam
- Flavors of Austria – TAF The Art Foundation, Athens

=== 2008 ===
- All you can eat – Lukas Feichtner Galerie, Vienna (solo)
- Pilotenküche – Baumwollspinnerei, Leipzig

=== 2007 ===
- Walter Koschatzky Kunstpreis 2007 – mumok, Vienna

=== 2006 ===
- Der beobachtete Beobachter (The Observed Observer) – Kunsthalle Krems (solo)
- Strange Cargo – quartier21 / MuseumsQuartier Vienna (group, institution)
- Nairobi Retour – Kunsthalle Wien project space (group, museum)

=== 2005 ===
- New Perspectives – Galerie Frey, Vienna

== Publications ==
- Stylianos Schicho. Kerber Verlag, Bielefeld/Berlin, 2013. Texts by Peter Bogner, Stylianos Schicho, Markus Hafner, Günther Oberhollenzer, Giulio-Enrico Pisani.
