= Else Unger =

Austrian designer (1873–1936)

Else Unger was an Austrian designer of the decorative arts. Unger was connected to the Vienna Secession movement.

== Education ==
Unger was a student at the Kunstgewerbeschule Wien (School of Applied Arts, Austria).

== Work ==
A member of the Wiener Werkstätte, Unger designed many decorative objects, including fabric, vases, and furniture.

Unger made a splash at the Exposition Universelle (1900) with a secretary desk carved with a hydrangea motif. This piece in particular brought together both a curved style and botanical patterns that were associated with Secessionist designs. Art critic Ludwig Hevesi noted that the piece's motif was "taken from less frequently tread areas of botany." Unger's carved desk fit nicely with the Secession motto "Ver Sacrum" (Sacred Spring). Unger was part of a larger group of Kunstgewerbeschule Wien students participating in the exhibition who gained critical recognition of their skill with objects and fabrics deemed appropriate for the home.

Unger, along with her colleagues Jutta Sicka and Marietta Peyfuss, contributed fabric embroidery designs to the magazine Wiener Mode; their contributions largely worked to elevate such a handicrafts section in a magazine to a higher art form. The magazine published the designs in the "Handarbeit" section, so that at-home readers could reproduce them.

Unger was a founding member, along with Gisela Falke von Lilienstein and Josef Hoffmann, and others, of the Wiener Kunst im Hause (Viennese Art in the Home), an exhibiting group, established in 1901. During the winter of 1901–1902, the group showcased three fully furnished interiors — a bedroom, a men's room, a dining room — to show that rooms could be well-designed on a budget. The group's women artists produced the decorative objects, including the rugs, linens, porcelain, and silver; these objects received more critical attention than the items made by the men of the group. Wiener Kunst im Hause exhibited in other artistically styled rooms in different periodicals like the style magazine Das Interieur and the feminist periodical Dokumente der Frauen (co-founded by Marie Lang.) Examples of Unger's work are held at the Museum of Applied Arts, Vienna.
