= Ernestine Tahedl =

Canadian painter (born 1940)

- Born: 1940 (age 85–86); Vienna, Austria
- Education: University of Applied Arts Vienna (MA)
- Occupation: Painter

Ernestine Tahedl RCA (born 1940) is a Canadian painter.

Born in Vienna, Tahedl studied at the Academy of Applied Arts Vienna, receiving her Master of Arts in graphic arts in 1961. For the next two years she worked with her father, Heinrich Tahedl, on the design and execution of stained glass pieces, before her emigration to Canada. She produced a portfolio of etchings, Circle of Energy, in 1981, and did restoration work on the church of Christ the King in Klagenfurt in 1989. Otherwise she is best known for her abstract landscapes. Her paintings are often inspired by her travels and by classical music; she sometimes paints while listening to symphonies and operas, naming the canvases after the works that accompanied their creation. Reflecting on her practice, she has stated: "I hope that spirituality and serenity are integral to my work, as colour and light are additional factors that guide me."

She has exhibited throughout Canada, the United States, and Europe both in solo shows and group exhibitions, and her work is in numerous public, private, and corporate collections. She is also presented by online art platforms like Singulart, Saatchi, and artsy. In 1967, she received a Canada Council arts award; in 1967, she was the recipient of a purchase award at the Concours Artistiques du Québec, and in 1966 she was awarded the Royal Architectural Institute of Canada's allied arts medal. In 1963 she won a bronze medal at the Vienna International Exhibition of Paintings; she has also received other awards throughout her career.
