= Marian Mahler =

British textile designer

Marianne Mahler (5 January 1908 – 1982), was a British designer, commercial artist, and book illustrator.

Marianne Mahler was born on 5 January 1908 in Wies, Melk, Niederösterreich, Austria, the daughter of Jewish parents Josef Wolf Mahler and Ernestine Penizek.

She grew up in Vienna, and trained there at the Kunstgewerbeschule from 1929 to 1932, followed by the Royal State Academy.

In 1937, Mahler emigrated to the UK and created designs as Marian Mahler for textile manufacturers including Allan Walton, Edinburgh Weavers and Donald Brothers, and is best known for her work in furnishing fabrics for David Whitehouse Ltd in the 1950s.

Her 1982 death registration records her birth as 5 January 1909.

Her work is in the permanent collections of London's Victoria & Albert Museum, the University of Edinburgh, and MoMA, New York.
