= Fritz Waerndorfer =

Austrian entrepreneur (1868–1939)

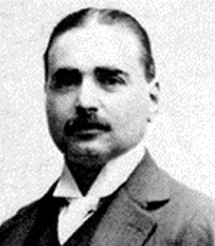
- Waerndorfer in 1903
- Born: Fritz Waerndorfer; 5 May 1868; Vienna, Austria
- Died: 9 August 1939 (aged 71); Bryn Mawr, Pennsylvania, United States

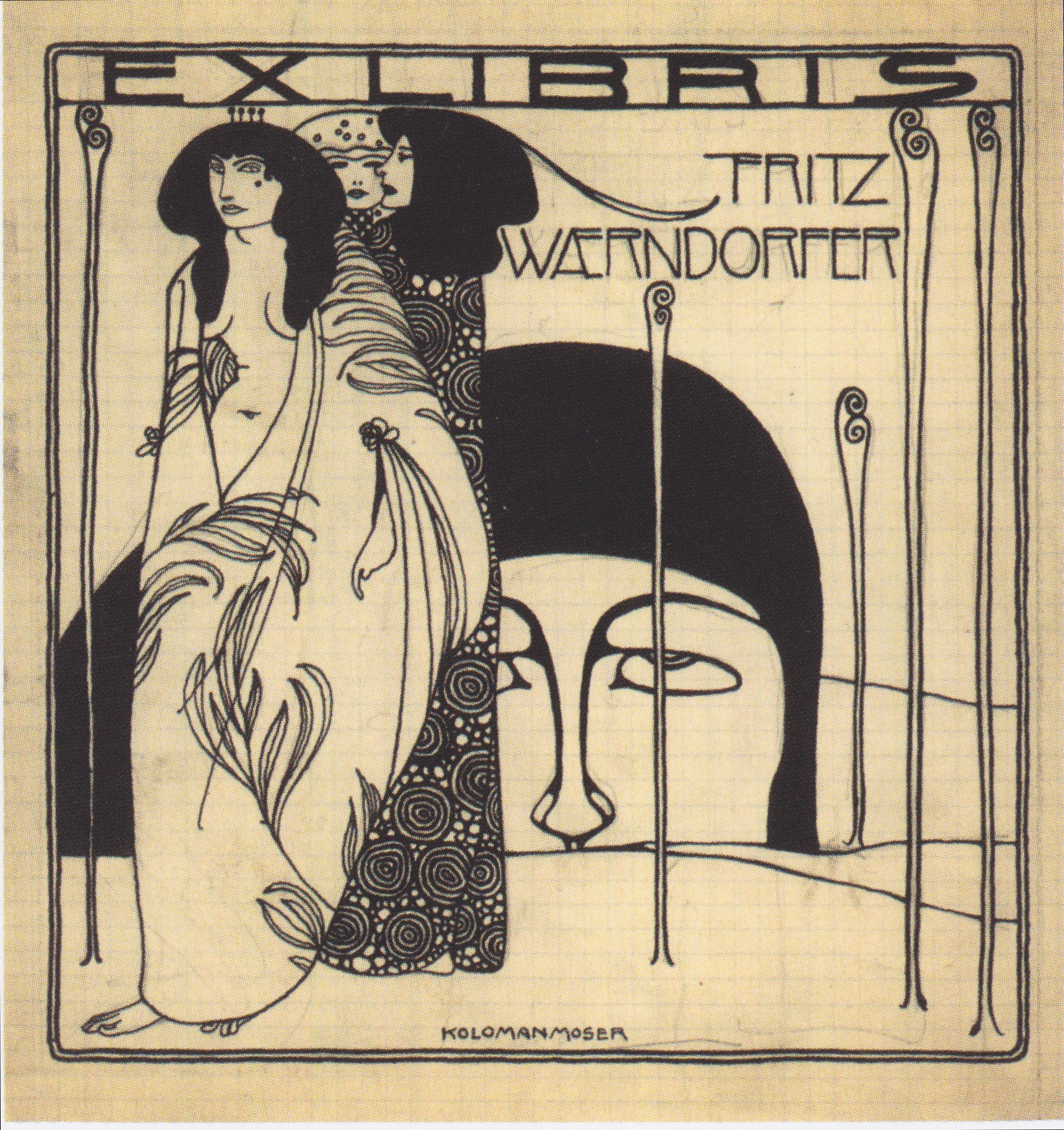
Bookplate for Waerndorfer, designed by Kolo Moser, 1903

Friedrich Waerndorfer, originally Wärndorfer (5 May 1868 – 9 August 1939), was an Austrian entrepreneur, patron of the arts, and founding member of the Wiener Werkstätte. He was also known as Fred Warndorf.

== Early life ==
Wärndorfer was born in Vienna into a Jewish industrialist family, which owned one of the largest cotton processing companies in the Austrian monarchy. He was the son of Samuel Wärndorfer (1842-1912) and his wife Berta née Neumann (1844-1921).

His mother and aunt collected art and from an early age, Waerndorfer was taken to art exhibitions.

In 1895 Waerndorfer married the translator Lili Jeanette (née Hellmann 1874-1952), with whom he had three children: Helene ("Helen") (1897-1938), Karl Richard ("Charles Richard Warndof") (1899-1983) and Herbert (1905- 1924).

Lili Hellmann Waerndorfer was an unconventional woman who was one the first women in Austria to obtain a driver's license and who published at least one mystery novel - The End Of The Honeymoon - in 1914. Like Fritz, Lili was born in Vienna (September 29, 1874) and died in the United States (May 1952, in Nyack, California).

== Patron of the arts ==
Through Hermann Bahr, Waerndorfer came into contact with the Vienna Secession and its leading members such as Josef Hoffmann, Gustav Klimt and Koloman Moser.

Fritz and Lili commissioned Hoffmann and Moser to redecorate their home in the new style. "Just inside their front door opened, the entrance hall displayed the harmonious Hoffmann style, its blend of ideal squares and parallel lines. On a pedestal there was the first of sixteen sculptures by the Belgian sculptor and graphic artist George Minne, a Waerndorfer favorite. Fritz Wearndorfer was the first owner of Minne's most famous work, The Fountain of Five Kneeling Boys (1898), exhibited by the Secession in Vienna 1900 and now in the collection of the Museum of Fine Arts, Ghent. Another work by Minne, the marble Le Macon or The Bricklayer, was displayed in the Waerndorfer's Galerium." Gustav Klimt's Still Water. Park At Schlosskammer hung prominently next to the fireplace in the living room.

In 1902 Fritz Waerndorfer ordered from Charles Rennie Mackintosh of Glasgow the furnishing of a music salon in the villa in Vienna 18th, Carl-Ludwig-Strasse 45 (today Weimarer Strasse 59, corner Colloredogasse 19), where he and his wife lived with his father Samuel (1843-1907) and his brother August (1865-1940). The father and the two brothers were registered in 1902 (in the spelling Wärndorfer) in Lehmann's allgemeiner Wohnungs-Anzeiger für Wien as partners of the Náchoder Baumwollspinnerei Wärndorfer, Benedict, Mautner.

Margaret Macdonald Mackintosh designed a frieze for the salon at the same time based on motifs by the Belgian poet Maurice Maeterlinck's "The Seven Princesses".

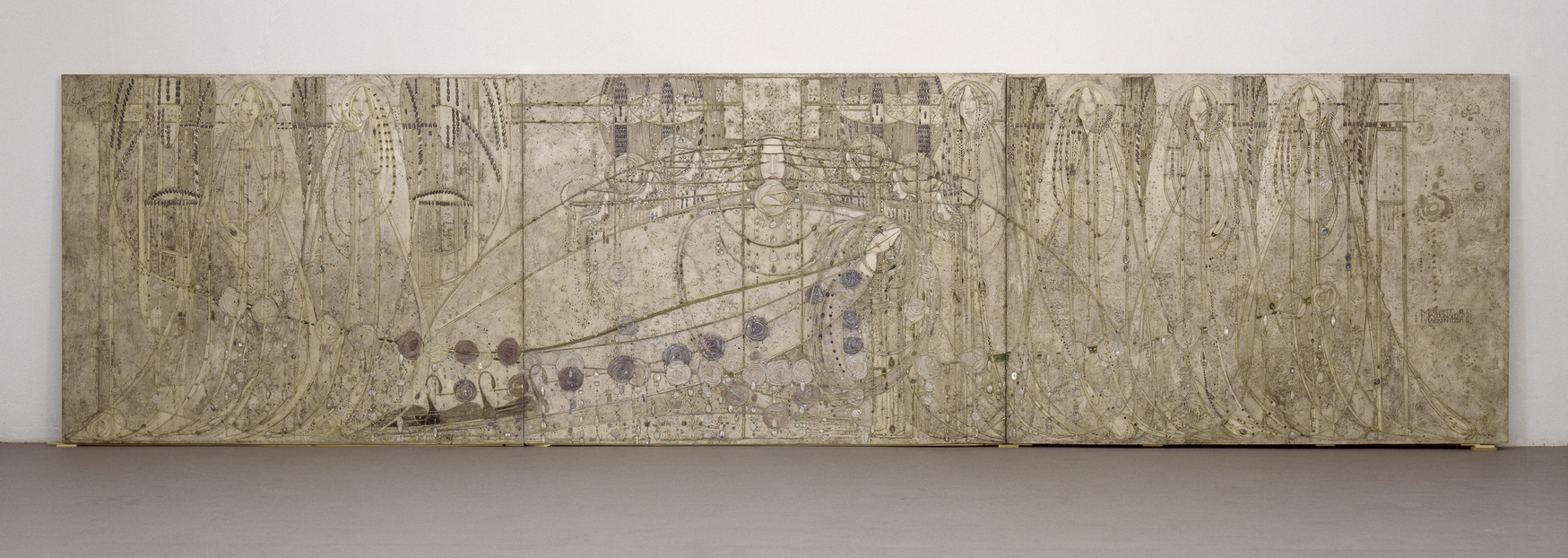
So-called. Waerndorfer frieze from the music salon of the Villa Waerndorfer in Vienna, 1906, exhibited at MAK Vienna.

In 1903 Fritz Waerndorfer financed the founding of the Wiener Werkstätte and became its commercial director. In 1913 he was forced to declare personal bankruptcy, forfeiting 12.5 million crowns according to his son, and under pressure from his family emigrated to the US with his wife and son in 1914. Wiener Werkstätte GmbH, also bankrupt, was rescued by Otto Primavesi, Moritz Gallia and others. In the United States, he first became a farmer, then worked as a designer for a textile company and began painting watercolors, which were shown in 1927 at the Otto Nirenstein Gallery (later known as Otto Kallir) in Vienna.

Fritz Waerndorfer owned a large art collection, which included important works by Gustav Klimt, such as Orchard in the Evening, Pallas Athene and Hope I. Among other things, his collection included about 150 letters by Aubrey Beardsley and works by George Minne, both artists who had been honored by the Secessionists in exhibitions. Another focus was on numerous graphic works by Koloman Moser and Marcus Behmer.

His extensive letters to Carl Otto Czeschka, who was appointed to the Kunstgewerbeschule in Hamburg from Vienna in 1907, document Czeschka's further intensive collaboration with the Wiener Werkstätte.

"Under pressure from his family to avoid the disgrace of economic ruin, Fritz Waerndorfer finally declared bankruptcy in 1913, losing both his and Lili's combined fortunes. The couple then emigrated to the United States in 1914. Waerndorfer worked as a farmer and then, the man who had owned textile factories, became a designer for a textile company."

In the U.S. he called himself "Frederick Warndof" or "Fred Warndof" and worked as a farmer, designer and painter. The marriage between Fritz and Lili ended in 1930.

In 1931 Fritz married the young English-born pianist and composer Fiona McCleary (1900–1986).

Waerndorfer died on August 9, 1939, near Philadelphia in Bryn Mawr, Pennsylvania. His daughter, Helen, married Ernst Bunzl and remained in Vienna.

== Legacy and Claims for Nazi-looted art ==
When the Anschluss merged Austria with Nazi Germany in 1938, Waerndorfer's daughter, Helen and her husband Ernst were persecuted as Jews. Helen died in early 1938, and on 17 September 1938, Dr. Ernst Bunzl fled to France and later to Brazil.

The Bunzl art collection, lost during the Nazi period, has been the object of restitution claims and provenance research by numerous museums. Efforts to recover a Jan van Goyen currently in the Saarland Museum, have been unsuccessful. However around 30 objects that had once belonged to Ernst and Helene Bunzl - including van Goyen's River Landscape - were registered in the "Wanted" section of German Lost Art Foundation's database in August 2017.

The provenance in the database has been updated, "21 months after the announcement, the entry in the BVA database was updated at the end of December 2019: The reference to the Böhler Gallery was dropped, and the statement "probably Dr. Ernst and Helene Bunzl, Vienna" was added. Nevertheless, the BVA continues to describe the provenance as "unresolved."

A watercolor from the Bunzl collection, "Italian Peasant Girl" (1901) by Oskar Kokoschka, which was privately owned in Vienna for decades, was the subject of a private settlement in November 2018. Or a Chinese sculpture once in the Bunzl Collection. The head of a dignitary from the Song Dynasty (960-1279 AD), was restituted to the heiress in January 2019 on the recommendation of the Art Restitution Advisory Board from the holdings of the Museum of Applied Arts in Vienna. Where Hitler's art supplier Almas-Dietrich ultimately got van Goyen's "River Landscape" has not yet been clarified. In response to an inquiry by the Handelsblatt, the BVA has now promised "proactive" research."

The Austrian Advisory Board met on 11 January 2019, and revoked two recommendations by the Advisory Board on the cases of Grünebaum and Bunzl.

== Links ==
- Literature by and about Fritz Waerndorfer in the German National Library catalogue
- Eintrag zu Waerndorfer auf der Website Die Arbeitslosen von Marienthal des AGSÖ, des Archivs für die Geschichte der Soziologie in Österreich
- German Lost Art Foundation objects searched for from the collection of Helen and Ernst Bunzl.
- Kommission für Provenienzforchung
