= University of Applied Arts Vienna =

Arts university in Vienna, Austria

- Universität für angewandte Kunst Wien
- Type: public
- Established: 1867
- Rector: Dr. phil. Dipl.-Ing. Ulrike Kuch
- Administrative staff: 408
- Students: 1704 (Winter semester 2017/18)
- Location: Vienna, Austria; 48°12′27″N 16°22′54″E
- Website: dieangewandte.at

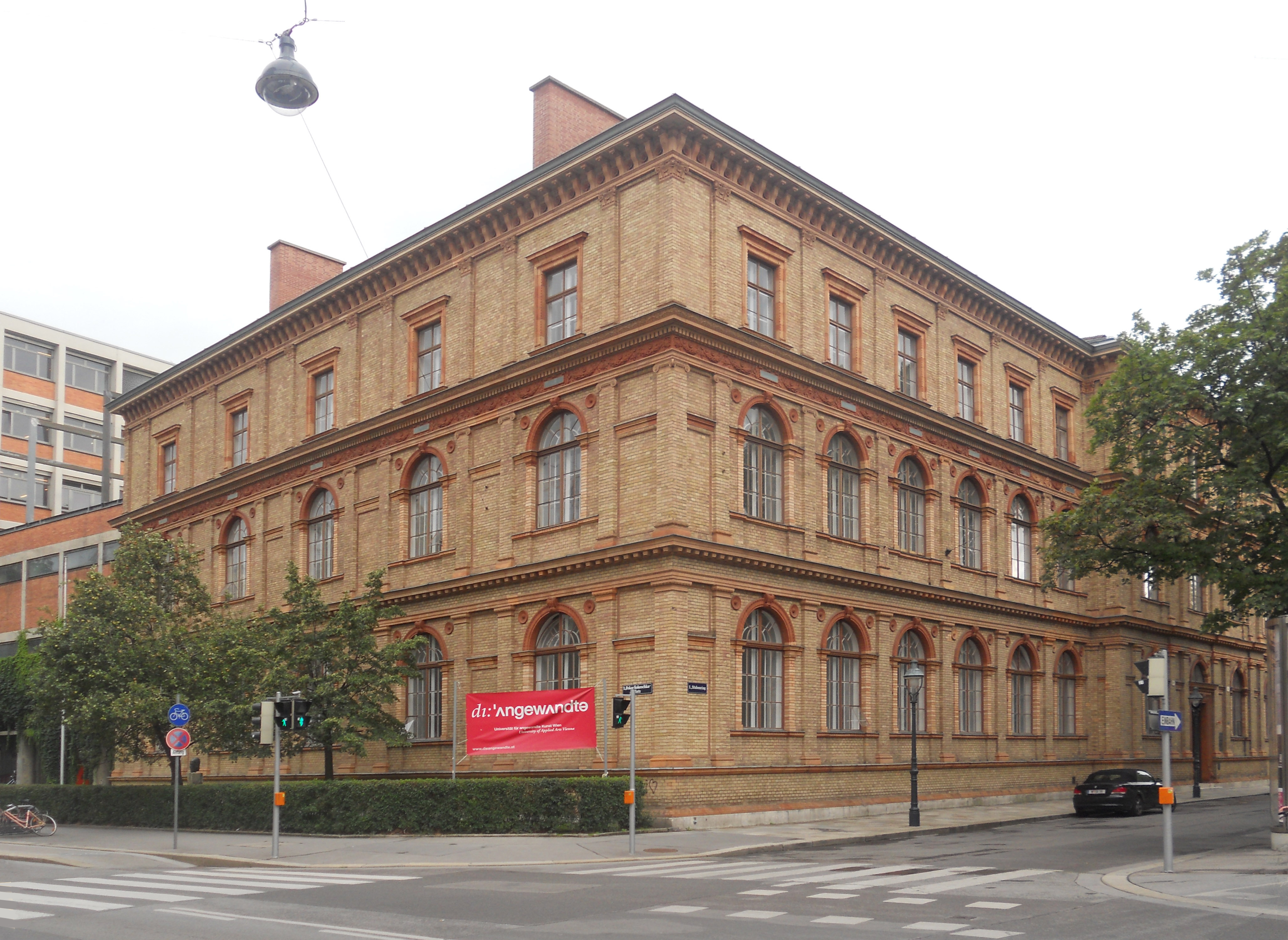
University of Applied Arts Vienna campus

The University of Applied Arts Vienna (German: Universität für angewandte Kunst Wien, or informally just Die Angewandte) is an arts university and institution of higher education in Vienna, the capital of Austria. It has had university status since 1970.

== History ==
The predecessor of the Angewandte was founded in 1863 as the k. k. Kunstgewerbeschule (Vienna School of Arts and Crafts), following the example of the South Kensington Museum in London, now the Victoria & Albert Museum, to set up a place of advanced education for designers and craftsmen with the Arts and Crafts School in Vienna. It was closely associated with the Österreichischen Museums für Kunst und Industrie (Imperial Royal Austrian Museum of Art and Industry, today known as the MAK).

It was the first school of its kind on the continent. In 1941 it became an institution of higher education. 1941–45 it was called "Reichshochschule fuer angewandte Kunst", and in 1948 was taken over by the Austrian state as an academy. In 1998 it was awarded the title of a university and renamed the Universität für angewandte Kunst (University of applied arts).

Famous artists such as Gustav Klimt, Oskar Kokoschka, Koloman Moser, Vivienne Westwood, Karl Lagerfeld, Jean-Charles de Castelbajac, Paul Kirnig, Jil Sander, Pipilotti Rist, Matteo Thun, François Valentiny, Hugo Markl and Stefan Sagmeister were part of the university's staff or student body. Today its faculty includes many distinguished artists and teachers, such as Craig Green, Judith Eisler, Erwin Wurm, Hartmut Esslinger, Hani Rashid (of Asymptote Architecture), Greg Lynn, Wolf D Prix (of Coop Himmelb(l)au), Peter Weibel and the philosopher Burghart Schmidt.

== Present ==
The university has currently ca. 1,800 students and c. 380 faculty. The students come from 70 countries to study in the 29 disciplines of the school, structured in 60% Austrians, 25% Europeans and 15% from other countries. The outcome of their processes is made public in ca. 200 exhibitions a year and a multitude of different events and other public presentations.

== Notable alumni ==
Notable alumni from the university are

- Walter Bosse (1904–1979), modernist brass sculpture
- Edeltrud Becher (1916–2016), Righteous Among the Nations
- Dorrit Dekk (1917–2014), graphic designer, printmaker and artist
- Augusta Kochanowska (1868–1927), Polish painter and illustrator
- Brigitte Kowanz (1957–2022), artist
- Matthias Laurenz Gräff (born 1984), artist
- Wiktoria Goryńska (1902–1945)
- Karl Hagenauer(1898–1956), Austrian designer in the Art Deco style
- Wolfgang Hoffmann (1900–1969), architect and designer
- Gustav Klimt (studied 1876 – 1883)
- Susan Kozma-Orlay (1913–2008), Hungarian–Australian designer
- Andreas Kronthaler (born 1966), designer for, and husband to Vivienne Westwood
- Marian Mahler (1911–1983), British textile designer
- Hugo Markl (born 1964), artist
- Pipilotti Rist (born 1962), visual artist
- Felice Rix-Ueno (1893–1967), textile artist
- Stefan Sagmeister (born 1962), designer
- Stylianos Schicho (born 1977), artist
- Pola Stout (1902–1984), textile designer
- Ernestine Tahedl (born 1940), artist
- Erwin Wurm (born 1954), artist
- Lisbeth Zwerger (born 1954), illustrator
- Thekla Kaischauri (born 1993), professional wrestler

== See also ==
- Vocational universities
- Höhere Graphische Bundes-Lehr- und Versuchsanstalt
