= Felice Rix-Ueno =

Austrian textile designer (1893–1967)

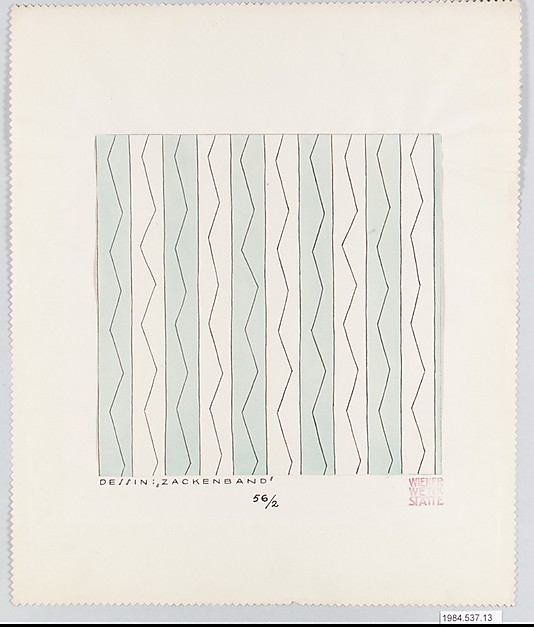
- Zigzag Braid by Felice Rix-Uno, 1922. Metropolitan Museum of Art
- Born: 1893; Vienna
- Died: 1967 (aged 73–74)
- Education: University of Applied Arts Vienna
- Occupations: Textile, wallpaper, and craft designer
- Known for: Influential figure in the Japanese modern art scene

Felice "Lizzie" Rix-Ueno (1893–1967) was an Austrian textile, wallpaper, and craft designer. She lived in Japan, and became an influential figure in the Japanese modern art scene.

== Early life and education ==
Felice Rix was born in Vienna. She studied at University of Applied Arts Vienna and Josef Hoffmann was her teacher.

== Career ==
She worked at Wiener Werkstätte. There, she designed wallpaper and textiles. She married Japanese architect Isaburo Ueno in 1925, who worked at Hoffmann's architecture firm. They moved to Japan. She taught at the Kyoto City University of Arts after World War II.

== Legacy ==
Her work is in held in the collection of the Cooper Hewitt, Smithsonian Design Museum, Metropolitan Museum of Art, Art Institute of Chicago, Los Angeles County Museum of Art, and the National Museum of Modern Art, Kyoto. The National Museum of Modern Art describes her work as "demonstrating the fusion of sensibilities of Vienna and Kyoto."
