= Bertold Löffler =

Austrian painter (1874–1960)

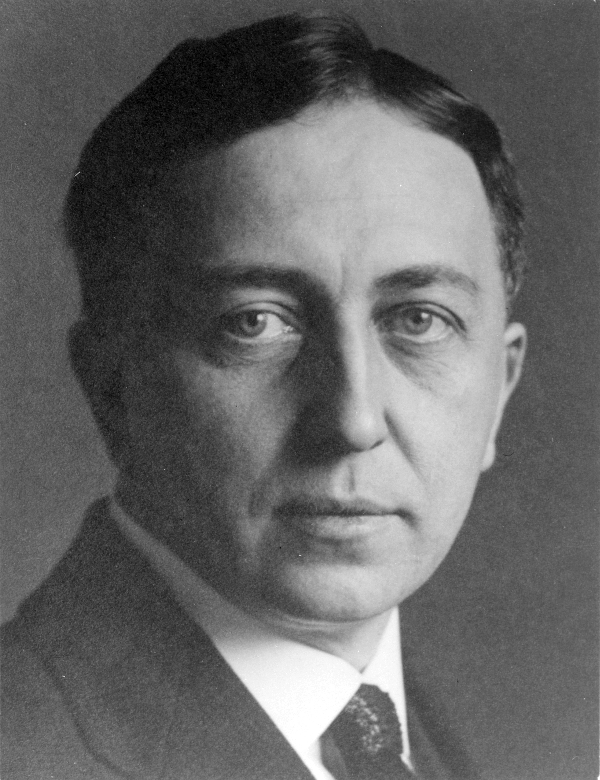
Bertold (Berthold) Loffler

Bertold Löffler (28 September 1874 in Liberec – 23 March 1960 in Vienna) was an Austrian painter, printmaker, and designer. His work was part of the painting event in the art competition at the 1936 Summer Olympics.
