= Dagobert Peche =

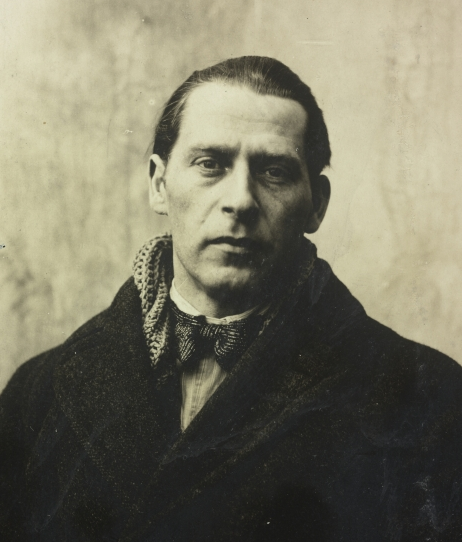
- Dagobert Peche c. 1920
- Born: 3 April 1887; Sankt Michael im Lungau, Austria
- Died: 16 April 1923 (aged 36); Modling, Austria
- Style: Spiky Baroque
- Movement: Wiener Werkstätte

Dagobert Peche (3 April 1887, Sankt Michael/Lungau, Duchy of Salzburg – 16 April 1923, Modling) was an Austrian artist and metalworker designer.

== Career ==
He joined the Wiener Werkstätte in 1915 and exhibited at Deutscher Werkbund Exhibition in Cologne and then became a co-director thereof in 1916. Whilst there in the early 1920s he introduced a 'spiky baroque' style inspired by folk-art, and using flowers, animals and human figures as decorative motifs.

Examples of works by Dagobert Peche

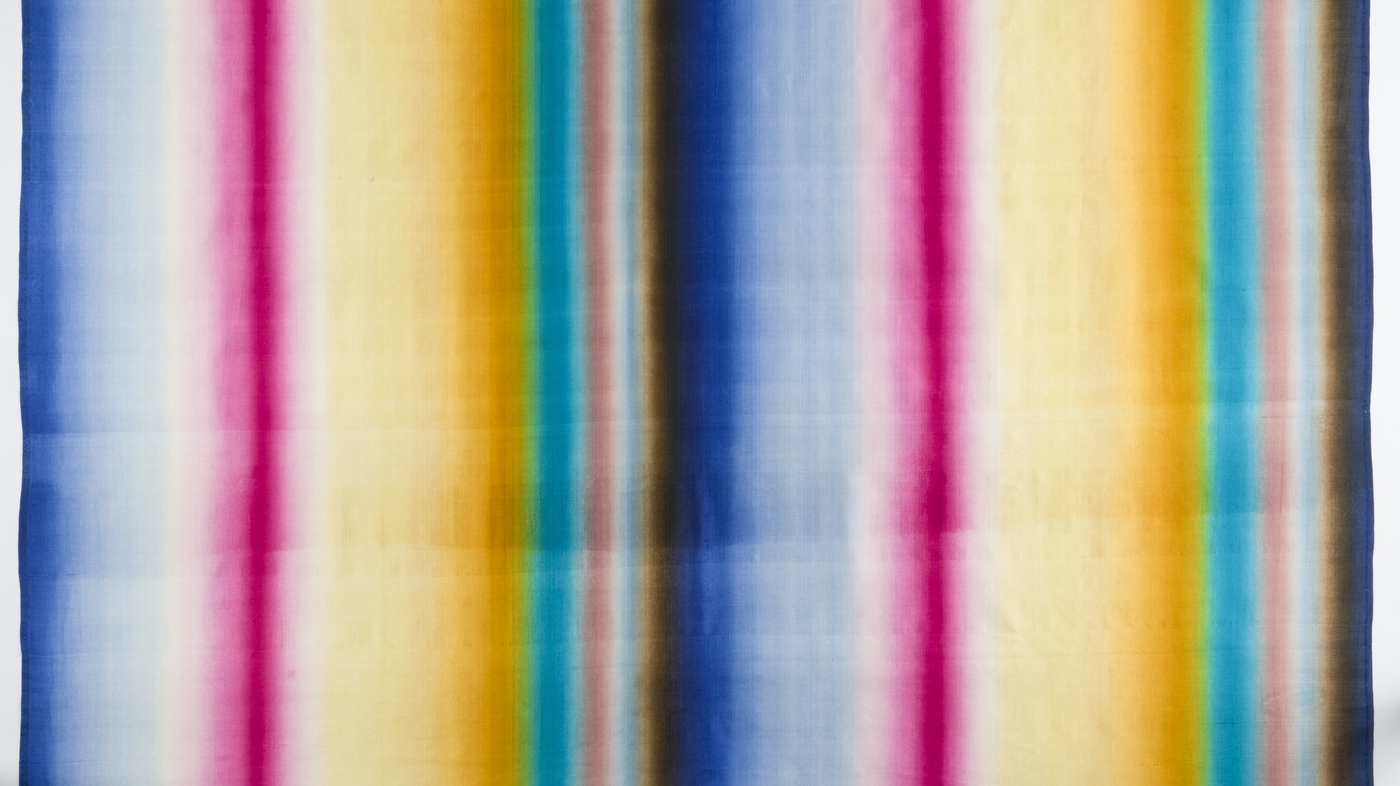
Rainbow (fabric)

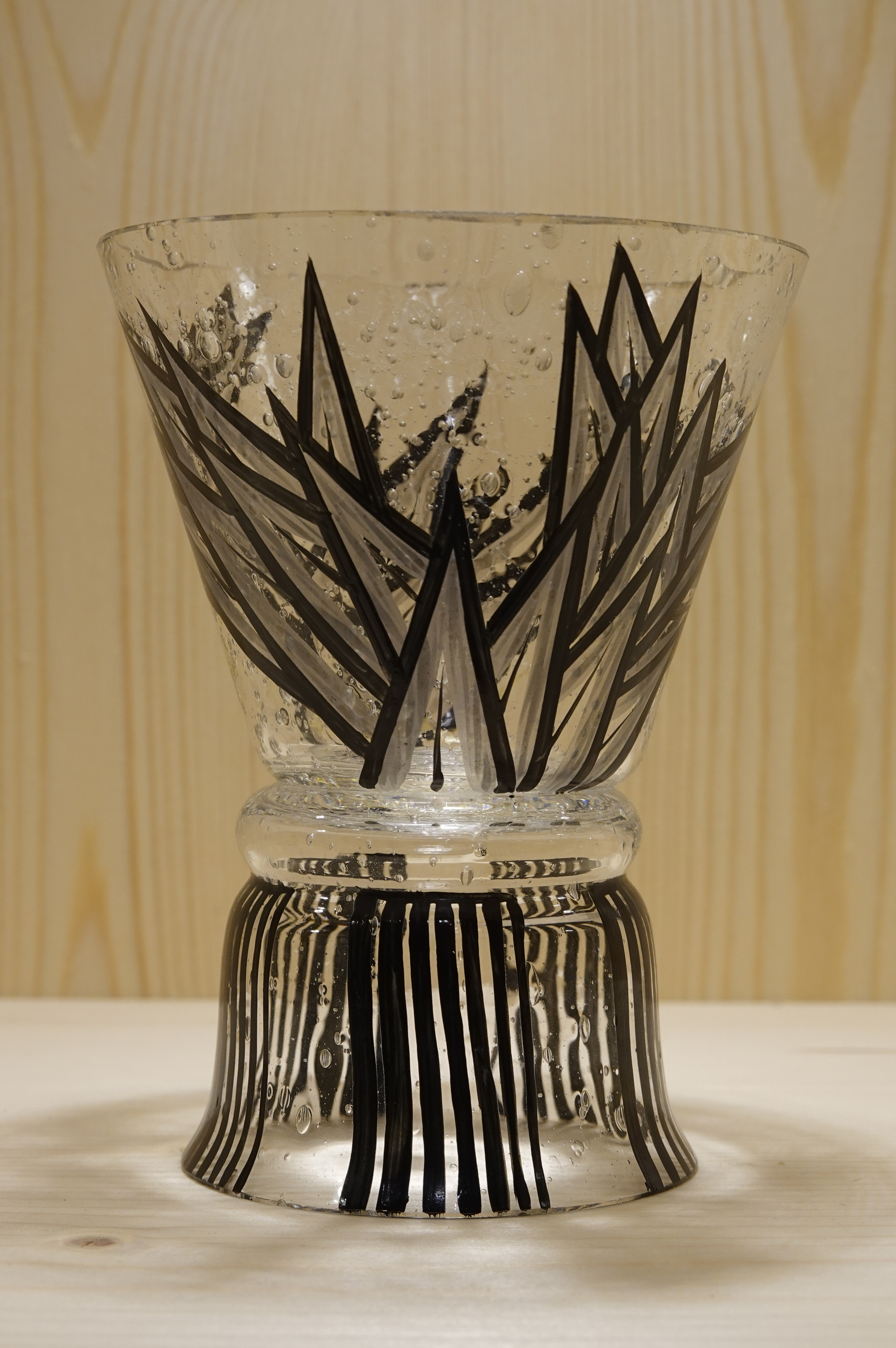
Glass trophy with black enamel decoration

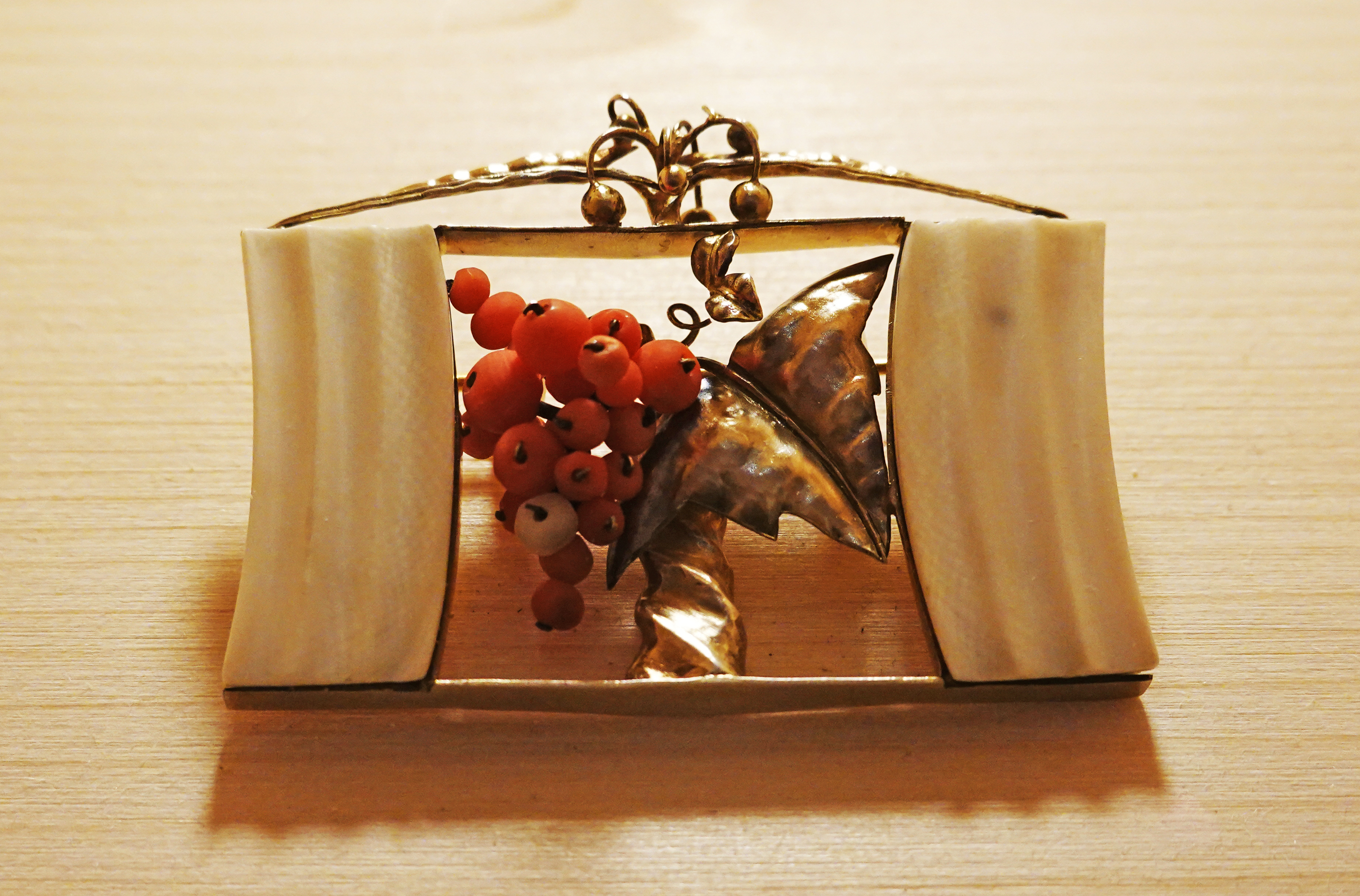
Brooche
