= List of oldest and youngest Academy Award winners and nominees =

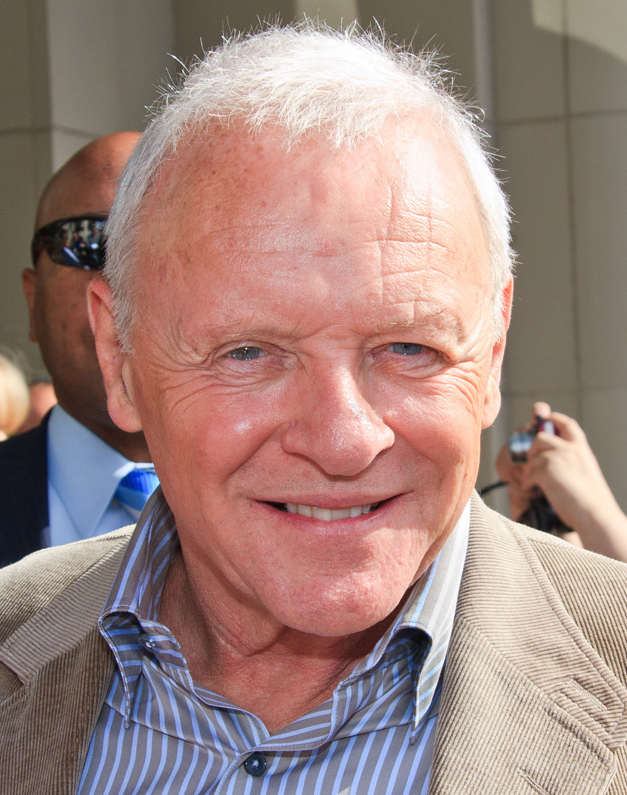
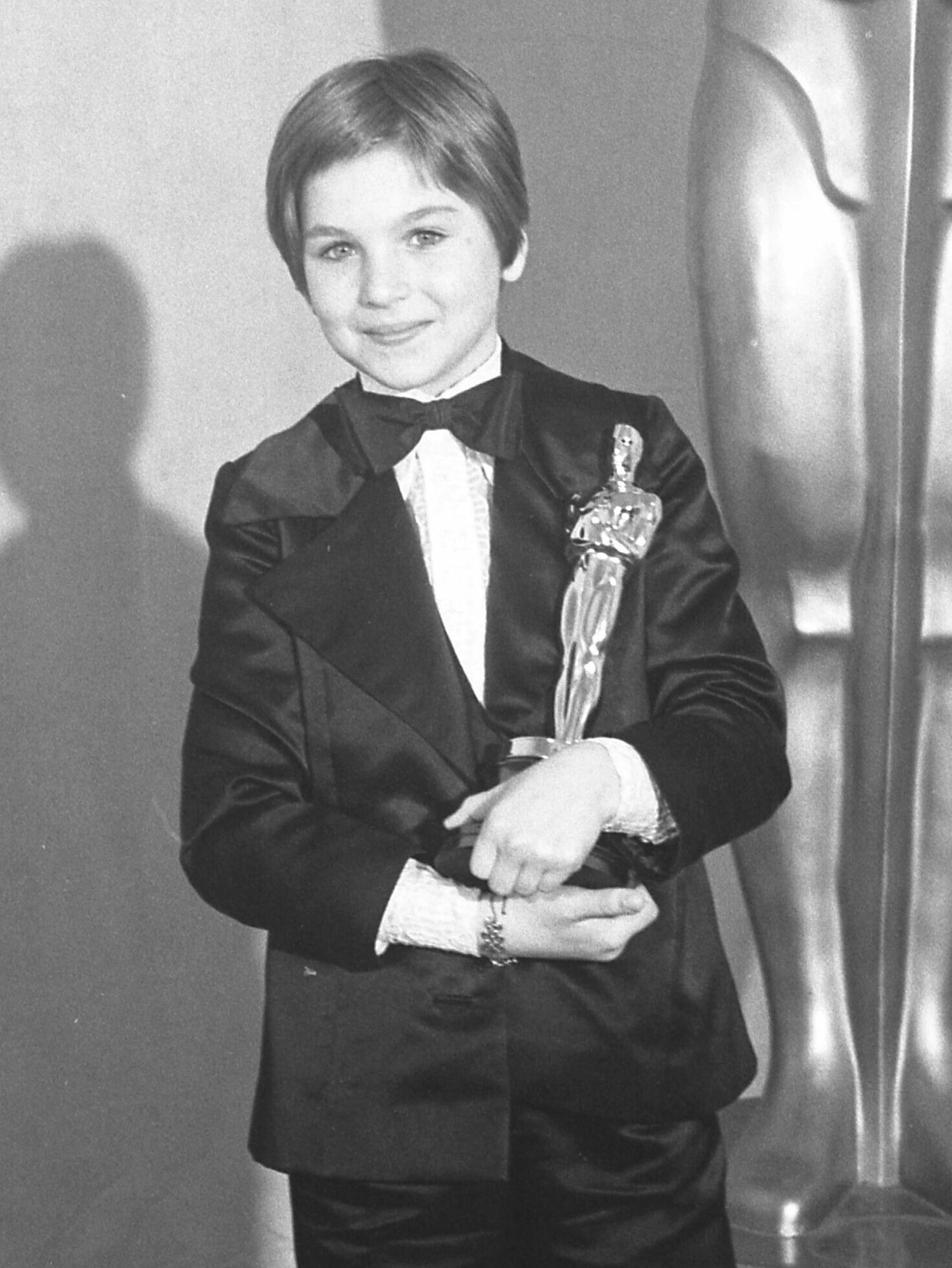
Anthony Hopkins and Tatum O'Neal are the oldest and youngest winners of acting Oscars, winning at age 83 and age 10 respectively.

This article lists the oldest and youngest Academy Award winners and nominees in the directing and acting award categories.

This list is current as of the 98th Academy Awards ceremony held on March 15, 2026, and is based on statistics documented in The Official Academy Awards Database.

== Superlatives ==
Among the oldest and youngest winners and nominees of Academy Awards in standard competitive categories, the following superlatives emerge:

Superlative	Overall		Director		Actor/Supporting Actor		Actress/Supporting Actress	
Oldest Nominee	Christopher Plummer	Age 88	Martin Scorsese	Age 81	Christopher Plummer	Age 88	Gloria Stuart	Age 87
Oldest Winner	Anthony Hopkins	Age 83	Clint Eastwood	Age 74	Anthony Hopkins	Age 83	Jessica Tandy	Age 80
Youngest Nominee	Justin Henry	Age 8	John Singleton	Age 24	Justin Henry	Age 8	Quvenzhané Wallis	Age 9
Youngest Winner	Tatum O'Neal	Age 10	Damien Chazelle	Age 32	Timothy Hutton	Age 20	Tatum O'Neal	Age 10

=== Craft and Technical ===
At the 90th Academy Awards, James Ivory became the oldest Oscar winner in any category, at age 89, after receiving the award for Best Adapted Screenplay for his work on Call Me by Your Name. At the 93rd Academy Awards, Ann Roth became the oldest woman to win an Oscar in any category, at age 89, after receiving the award for Best Costume Design for her work on Ma Rainey's Black Bottom.

At the 95th Academy Awards, John Williams became the oldest Oscar nominee in any category, at age 90, after receiving his 53rd Oscar nomination for Best Original Score for his work on The Fabelmans. At the 96th Academy Awards, he broke the record again, at age 91, after receiving his 54th Oscar nomination for Best Original Score for his work on Indiana Jones and the Dial of Destiny.

== Multiple winners ==
=== Youngest recipients ===
There are six people in Oscar history who have won two Oscars by the age of 30 or younger:

- Bette Davis for Dangerous and Jezebel
- Luise Rainer for The Great Ziegfeld and The Good Earth
- Jodie Foster for The Accused and The Silence of the Lambs
- Hilary Swank for Boys Don't Cry and Million Dollar Baby
- Billie Eilish and Finneas O'Connell for the songs "No Time to Die" from No Time to Die and "What Was I Made For?" from Barbie

Davis, Rainer, Foster, and Swank won their awards in the Best Actress category, while Eilish and O'Connell won theirs in the Best Original Song category. Eilish is the youngest person to have won two Oscars in any category, aged 22 at the time of her second win.

=== Oldest recipients ===
There are fourteen people in Oscar history who have won two or more Oscars at age of 60 or older:

- Joseph Ruttenberg for Somebody Up There Likes Me and Gigi
- Cedric Gibbons and Edwin B. Willis for Julius Caesar and Somebody Up There Likes Me
- Fred Quimby for The Cat Concerto, The Little Orphan, The Two Mouseketeers, and Johann Mouse
- Katharine Hepburn for Guess Who's Coming to Dinner, The Lion in Winter, and On Golden Pond
- Edith Head for The Facts of Life and The Sting
- Melvyn Douglas for Hud and Being There
- Glen Robinson for Earthquake, The Hindenburg, King Kong, and Logan's Run
- Clint Eastwood for Unforgiven and Million Dollar Baby
- Michael Kahn for Schindler's List and Saving Private Ryan
- Thelma Schoonmaker for The Aviator and The Departed
- Roger Deakins for Blade Runner 2049 and 1917
- Frances McDormand for Three Billboards Outside Ebbing, Missouri and Nomadland
- Hayao Miyazaki for Spirited Away and The Boy and the Heron

Ruttenberg, Gibbons and Willis, Quimby, Hepburn, Head, Kahn, Schoonmaker, and McDormand are the only people who have won awards when younger than 60, and also when aged 60 or older.

Hepburn is the only actress who won her awards more than twice after her 60s in the Best Actress category.

== Best Director ==
=== Oldest winners ===
Source: "Academy Award Statistics: Directing: Oldest/Youngest Directing Nominees/Winners", AMPAS Awards Database

Rank	Age	Name	Film	Year in Film	Date of Birth	Date of Award	Notes
1	74 years, 272 days	Clint Eastwood	Million Dollar Baby	2004	May 31, 1930	February 27, 2005	Has held record for 21 years (2005–present)
2	69 years, 217 days	Roman Polanski	The Pianist	2002	August 18, 1933	March 23, 2003	Held record for 2 years (2003–2005)
3	67 years, 331 days	Jane Campion	The Power of the Dog	2021	April 30, 1954	March 27, 2022	
4	65 years, 272 days	George Cukor	My Fair Lady	1964	July 7, 1899	April 5, 1965	Held record for 38 years (1965–2003)
5	64 years, 100 days	Martin Scorsese	The Departed	2006	November 17, 1942	February 25, 2007	
6	62 years, 302 days	Clint Eastwood	Unforgiven	1992	May 31, 1930	March 29, 1993	
7	62 years, 105 days	Carol Reed	Oliver!	1968	December 30, 1906	April 14, 1969	
8	59 years, 346 days	Fred Zinnemann	A Man for All Seasons	1966	April 29, 1907	April 10, 1967	
9	59 years, 225 days	Richard Attenborough	Gandhi	1982	August 29, 1923	April 11, 1983	
10	59 years, 46 days	John Ford	The Quiet Man	1952	February 1, 1894	March 19, 1953	Held record for 12 years (1953–1965)

=== Oldest nominees ===
Rank	Age	Name	Film	Year in Film	Date of Birth	Date of Nomination	Notes
1	81 years, 67 days	Martin Scorsese	Killers of the Flower Moon	2023	November 17, 1942	January 23, 2024	Has held record for 2 years (2024–present)
2	79 years, 184 days	John Huston	Prizzi's Honor	1985	August 5, 1906	February 5, 1986	Held record for 38 years (1986–2024)
3	78 years, 193 days	Charles Crichton	A Fish Called Wanda	1988	August 6, 1910	February 15, 1989	
4	77 years, 57 days	Martin Scorsese	The Irishman	2019	November 17, 1942	January 13, 2020	
5	76 years, 357 days	Robert Altman	Gosford Park	2001	February 20, 1925	February 12, 2002	
6	76 years, 318 days	David Lean	A Passage to India	1984	March 25, 1908	February 6, 1985	Held record for 1 year (1985–1986)
7	76 years, 237 days	Clint Eastwood	Letters from Iwo Jima	2006	May 31, 1930	January 23, 2007	
8	76 years, 55 days	Woody Allen	Midnight in Paris	2011	November 30, 1935	January 24, 2012	
9	76 years, 37 days	Steven Spielberg	The Fabelmans	2022	December 18, 1946	January 24, 2023	
10	75 years, 319 days	Akira Kurosawa	Ran	1985	March 23, 1910	February 5, 1986	

=== Youngest winners ===
Rank	Age	Name	Film	Year in Film	Date of Birth	Date of Award	Notes
1	32 years, 38 days	Damien Chazelle	La La Land	2016	January 19, 1985	February 26, 2017	Has held record for 9 years (2017–present)
2	32 years, 260 days	Norman Taurog	Skippy	1930/31	February 23, 1899	November 10, 1931	Held record for 86 years (1931–2017)
3	33 years, 228 days	Lewis Milestone	Two Arabian Knights	1927/28	September 30, 1895	May 16, 1929	Held record for 2 years (1929–1931)
4	34 years, 238 days	Sam Mendes	American Beauty	1999	August 1, 1965	March 26, 2000	
5	35 years, 23 days	Frank Borzage	7th Heaven	1927/28	April 23, 1894	May 16, 1929	
6	35 years, 30 days	Daniel Kwan	Everything Everywhere All at Once	2022	February 10, 1988	March 12, 2023	
7	35 years, 36 days	Lewis Milestone	All Quiet on the Western Front	1929/30	September 30, 1895	November 5, 1930	
8	35 years, 278 days	Daniel Scheinert	Everything Everywhere All at Once	2022	June 7, 1987	March 12, 2023	
9	35 years, 313 days	Tony Richardson	Tom Jones	1963	June 5, 1928	April 13, 1964	
10	36 years, 1 day	Francis Ford Coppola	The Godfather Part II	1974	April 7, 1939	April 8, 1975	

=== Youngest nominees ===
Rank	Age	Name	Film	Year in Film	Date of Birth	Date of Nomination	Notes
1	24 years, 44 days	John Singleton	Boyz n the Hood	1991	January 6, 1968	February 19, 1992	Has held record for 34 years (1992–present)
2	26 years, 279 days	Orson Welles	Citizen Kane	1941	May 6, 1915	February 9, 1942	Held record for 50 years (1942–1992)
3	29 years, 66 days	Kenneth Branagh	Henry V	1989	December 10, 1960	February 14, 1990	
4	29 years, 113 days	Claude Lelouch	A Man and a Woman	1966	October 30, 1937	February 20, 1967	
5	29 years, 193 days	M. Night Shyamalan	The Sixth Sense	1999	August 6, 1970	February 15, 2000	
6	29 years, 281 days	George Lucas	American Graffiti	1973	May 14, 1944	February 19, 1974	
7	30 years, 88 days	Benh Zeitlin	Beasts of the Southern Wild	2012	October 14, 1982	January 10, 2013	
8	30 years, 95 days	Jason Reitman	Juno	2007	October 19, 1977	January 22, 2008	
9	30 years, 116 days	Spike Jonze	Being John Malkovich	1999	October 22, 1969	February 15, 2000	
10	31 years, 65 days	Steven Spielberg	Close Encounters of the Third Kind	1977	December 18, 1946	February 21, 1978	

== Best Actor in a Leading Role ==
Source: "Academy Award Statistics: Acting: Oldest/Youngest Winners and Nominees for Acting, By Category: Actor [in a Leading Role]", AMPAS Awards Database

=== Oldest winners ===
Rank	Age	Name	Film	Year in Film	Date of Birth	Date of Award	Notes
1	83 years, 115 days	Anthony Hopkins	The Father	2020	December 31, 1937	April 25, 2021	Oldest winner in any acting category Has held record for 5 years (2021–present)
2	76 years, 317 days	Henry Fonda	On Golden Pond	1981	May 16, 1905	March 29, 1982	Held record for 39 years (1982–2021)
3	62 years, 316 days	John Wayne	True Grit	1969	May 26, 1907	April 7, 1970	Held record for 12 years (1970–1982)
4	62 years, 209 days	George Arliss	Disraeli	1929/30	April 10, 1868	November 5, 1930	Held record for 40 years (1930–1970); Earliest born winner of an award in any category
5	62 years, 63 days	Paul Newman	The Color of Money	1986	January 26, 1925	March 30, 1987	
6	60 years, 335 days	Jack Nicholson	As Good as It Gets	1997	April 22, 1937	March 23, 1998	
7	60 years, 181 days	Peter Finch	Network	1976	September 28, 1916	March 28, 1977	Posthumous award
8	60 years, 93 days	Jeff Bridges	Crazy Heart	2009	December 4, 1949	March 7, 2010	
9	59 years, 348 days	Gary Oldman	Darkest Hour	2017	March 21, 1958	March 4, 2018	
10	57 years, 40 days	Ronald Colman	A Double Life	1947	February 9, 1891	March 20, 1948	

=== Oldest nominees ===
Rank	Age	Name	Film	Year in Film	Date of Birth	Date of Nomination	Notes
1	83 years, 74 days	Anthony Hopkins	The Father	2020	December 31, 1937	March 15, 2021	Winner; Has held record for 5 years (2021–present)
2	79 years, 167 days	Richard Farnsworth	The Straight Story	1999	September 1, 1920	February 15, 2000	Held record for 21 years (2000–2021)
3	77 years, 226 days	Bruce Dern	Nebraska	2013	June 6, 1936	January 16, 2014	
4	76 years, 271 days	Henry Fonda	On Golden Pond	1981	May 16, 1905	February 11, 1982	Winner; Held record for 18 years (1982–2000)
5	74 years, 239 days	Clint Eastwood	Million Dollar Baby	2004	May 31, 1930	January 25, 2005	
6	74 years, 174 days	Peter O'Toole	Venus	2006	August 2, 1932	January 23, 2007	
7	73 years, 43 days	Bill Nighy	Living	2022	December 12, 1949	January 24, 2023	
8	72 years, 246 days	Morgan Freeman	Invictus	2009	June 1, 1937	February 2, 2010	
9	72 years, 226 days	Jonathan Pryce	The Two Popes	2019	June 1, 1947	January 13, 2020	
10	71 years, 274 days	Laurence Olivier	The Boys from Brazil	1978	May 22, 1907	February 20, 1979	Held record for 3 years (1979–1982)

=== Youngest winners ===
Rank	Age	Name	Film	Year in Film	Date of Birth	Date of Award	Notes
1	29 years, 343 days	Adrien Brody	The Pianist	2002	April 14, 1973	March 23, 2003	Has held record for 23 years (2003–present)
2	30 years, 156 days	Richard Dreyfuss	The Goodbye Girl	1977	October 29, 1947	April 3, 1978	Held record for 25 years (1978–2003)
3	30 years, 361 days	Marlon Brando	On the Waterfront	1954	April 3, 1924	March 30, 1955	Held record for 23 years (1955–1978)
4	31 years, 122 days	Maximilian Schell	Judgment at Nuremberg	1961	December 8, 1930	April 9, 1962	
5	32 years, 78 days	Nicolas Cage	Leaving Las Vegas	1995	January 7, 1964	March 25, 1996	
6	32 years, 283 days	James Stewart	The Philadelphia Story	1940	May 20, 1908	February 27, 1941	Held record for 14 years (1941–1955)
7	32 years, 331 days	Daniel Day-Lewis	My Left Foot	1989	April 29, 1957	March 26, 1990	
8	33 years, 47 days	Eddie Redmayne	The Theory of Everything	2014	January 6, 1982	February 22, 2015	
9	34 years, 26 days	Clark Gable	It Happened One Night	1934	February 1, 1901	February 27, 1935	Held record for 6 years (1935–1941)
10	34 years, 258 days	Charles Laughton	The Private Life of Henry VIII	1932/33	July 1, 1899	March 16, 1934	Held record for 1 year (1934–1935)

=== Youngest nominees ===
Rank	Age	Name	Film	Year in Film	Date of Birth	Date of Nomination	Notes
1	9 years, 20 days	Jackie Cooper	Skippy	1930/31	September 15, 1922	October 5, 1931	Has held record for 95 years (1931–present)
2	19 years, 142 days	Mickey Rooney	Babes in Arms	1939	September 23, 1920	February 12, 1940	
3	22 years, 27 days	Timothée Chalamet	Call Me by Your Name	2017	December 27, 1995	January 23, 2018	
4	23 years, 137 days	Mickey Rooney	The Human Comedy	1943	September 23, 1920	February 7, 1944	
5	24 years, 3 days	John Travolta	Saturday Night Fever	1977	February 18, 1954	February 21, 1978	
6	25 years, 10 days	James Dean	East of Eden	1955	February 8, 1931	February 18, 1956	Posthumous nomination
7	26 years, 10 days	James Dean	Giant	1956	February 8, 1931	February 18, 1957	Posthumous nomination
8	26 years, 72 days	Ryan Gosling	Half Nelson	2006	November 12, 1980	January 23, 2007	
9	26 years, 279 days	Orson Welles	Citizen Kane	1941	May 6, 1915	February 9, 1942	
10	26 years, 302 days	Heath Ledger	Brokeback Mountain	2005	April 4, 1979	January 31, 2006	

== Best Actress in a Leading Role ==
Source: "Academy Award Statistics: Acting: Oldest/Youngest Winners and Nominees for Acting, By Category: Actress [in a Leading Role]", AMPAS Awards Database

=== Oldest winners ===
Rank	Age	Name	Film	Year in Film	Date of Birth	Date of Award	Notes
1	80 years, 292 days	Jessica Tandy	Driving Miss Daisy	1989	June 7, 1909	March 26, 1990	Has held record for 36 years (1990–present)
2	74 years, 321 days	Katharine Hepburn	On Golden Pond	1981	May 12, 1907	March 29, 1982	Held record for 8 years (1982–1990)
3	63 years, 306 days	Frances McDormand	Nomadland	2020	June 23, 1957	April 25, 2021	
4	63 years, 1 day	Marie Dressler	Min and Bill	1930/31	November 9, 1868	November 10, 1931	Held record for 51 years (1931–1982)
5	62 years, 249 days	Meryl Streep	The Iron Lady	2011	June 22, 1949	February 26, 2012	
6	61 years, 337 days	Katharine Hepburn	The Lion in Winter	1968	May 12, 1907	April 14, 1969	
7	61 years, 214 days	Helen Mirren	The Queen	2006	July 26, 1945	February 25, 2007	
8	61 years, 122 days	Geraldine Page	The Trip to Bountiful	1985	November 22, 1924	March 24, 1986	
9	60 years, 334 days	Katharine Hepburn	Guess Who's Coming to Dinner	1967	May 12, 1907	April 10, 1968	
10	60 years, 254 days	Frances McDormand	Three Billboards Outside Ebbing, Missouri	2017	June 23, 1957	March 4, 2018	

=== Oldest nominees ===
Rank	Age	Name	Film	Year in Film	Date of Birth	Date of Nomination	Notes
1	85 years, 321 days	Emmanuelle Riva	Amour	2012	February 24, 1927	January 10, 2013	Has held record for 13 years (2013–present)
2	80 years, 252 days	Jessica Tandy	Driving Miss Daisy	1989	June 7, 1909	February 14, 1990	Winner; Held record for 23 years (1990–2013)
3	80 years, 11 days	Edith Evans	The Whisperers	1967	February 8, 1888	February 19, 1968	Held record for 22 years (1968–1990)
4	79 years, 38 days	Judi Dench	Philomena	2013	December 9, 1934	January 16, 2014	
5	75 years, 313 days	May Robson	Lady for a Day	1932/33	April 19, 1858	February 26, 1934	Held record for 34 years (1934–1968); Earliest born nominee in any category
6	74 years, 275 days	Katharine Hepburn	On Golden Pond	1981	May 12, 1907	February 11, 1982	Winner
7	72 years, 45 days	Judi Dench	Notes on a Scandal	2006	December 9, 1934	January 23, 2007	
8	71 years, 309 days	Glenn Close	The Wife	2018	March 19, 1947	January 22, 2019	
9	71 years, 53 days	Judi Dench	Mrs Henderson Presents	2005	December 9, 1934	January 31, 2006	
10	69 years, 343 days	Charlotte Rampling	45 Years	2015	February 5, 1946	January 14, 2016	

=== Youngest winners ===
Rank	Age	Name	Film	Year in Film	Date of Birth	Date of Award	Notes
1	21 years, 218 days	Marlee Matlin	Children of a Lesser God	1986	August 24, 1965	March 30, 1987	Has held record for 39 years (1987–present)
2	22 years, 193 days	Jennifer Lawrence	Silver Linings Playbook	2012	August 15, 1990	February 24, 2013	
3	22 years, 222 days	Janet Gaynor	7th Heaven, Street Angel, and Sunrise	1927/28	October 6, 1906	May 16, 1929	Held record for 58 years (1929–1987)
4	24 years, 127 days	Joan Fontaine	Suspicion	1941	October 22, 1917	February 26, 1942	
5	24 years, 325 days	Audrey Hepburn	Roman Holiday	1953	May 4, 1929	March 25, 1954	
6	25 years, 0 days	Jennifer Jones	The Song of Bernadette	1943	March 2, 1919	March 2, 1944	
7	25 years, 138 days	Grace Kelly	The Country Girl	1954	November 12, 1929	March 30, 1955	
8	25 years, 240 days	Hilary Swank	Boys Don't Cry	1999	July 30, 1974	March 26, 2000	
9	25 years, 342 days	Mikey Madison	Anora	2024	March 25, 1999	March 2, 2025	
10	26 years, 4 days	Julie Christie	Darling	1965	April 14, 1940	April 18, 1966	

=== Youngest nominees ===
Rank	Age	Name	Film	Year in Film	Date of Birth	Date of Nomination	Notes
1	9 years, 135 days	Quvenzhané Wallis	Beasts of the Southern Wild	2012	August 28, 2003	January 10, 2013	Has held record for 13 years (2013–present)
2	13 years, 309 days	Keisha Castle-Hughes	Whale Rider	2003	March 24, 1990	January 27, 2004	Held record for 9 years (2004–2013)
3	20 years, 163 days	Jennifer Lawrence	Winter's Bone	2010	August 15, 1990	January 25, 2011	
4	20 years, 235 days	Isabelle Adjani	The Story of Adele H.	1975	June 27, 1955	February 17, 1976	Held record for 28 years (1976–2004)
5	20 years, 311 days	Keira Knightley	Pride & Prejudice	2005	March 26, 1985	January 31, 2006	
6	20 years, 335 days	Elliot Page	Juno	2007	February 21, 1987	January 22, 2008	Page was presenting as female when he received this nomination, prior to his transition as a transmasculine in 2020.
7	21 years, 171 days	Marlee Matlin	Children of a Lesser God	1986	August 24, 1965	February 11, 1987	Winner
8	21 years, 277 days	Saoirse Ronan	Brooklyn	2015	April 12, 1994	January 14, 2016	
9	22 years, 60 days	Elizabeth Hartman	A Patch of Blue	1965	December 23, 1943	February 21, 1966	Held record for 10 years (1966–1976)
10	22 years, 128 days	Kate Winslet	Titanic	1997	October 5, 1975	February 10, 1998	

== Best Actor in a Supporting Role ==
Source: "Academy Award Statistics: Acting: Oldest/Youngest Winners and Nominees for Acting, By Category: Actor [in a Supporting Role]", AMPAS Awards Database

=== Oldest winners ===
Rank	Age	Name	Film	Year in Film	Date of Birth	Date of Award	Notes
1	82 years, 75 days	Christopher Plummer	Beginners	2011	December 13, 1929	February 26, 2012	Has held record for 14 years (2012–present)
2	80 years, 69 days	George Burns	The Sunshine Boys	1975	January 20, 1896	March 29, 1976	Held record for 36 years (1976–2012)
3	79 years, 9 days	Melvyn Douglas	Being There	1979	April 5, 1901	April 14, 1980	
4	77 years, 349 days	John Gielgud	Arthur	1981	April 14, 1904	March 29, 1982	
5	77 years, 297 days	Don Ameche	Cocoon	1985	May 31, 1908	March 24, 1986	
6	73 years, 41 days	Jack Palance	City Slickers	1991	February 18, 1919	March 30, 1992	
7	72 years, 336 days	Alan Arkin	Little Miss Sunshine	2006	March 26, 1934	February 25, 2007	
8	71 years, 192 days	John Houseman	The Paper Chase	1973	September 22, 1902	April 2, 1974	Held record for 2 years (1974–1976)
9	70 years, 202 days	James Coburn	Affliction	1998	August 31, 1928	March 21, 1999	
10	70 years, 176 days	Edmund Gwenn	Miracle on 34th Street	1947	September 26, 1877	March 20, 1948	Held record for 26 years (1948–1974)

=== Oldest nominees ===
Rank	Age	Name	Film	Year in Film	Date of Birth	Date of Nomination	Notes
1	88 years, 41 days	Christopher Plummer	All the Money in the World	2017	December 13, 1929	January 23, 2018	Oldest nominee in any acting category Has held record for 8 years (2018–present)
2	87 years, 315 days	Judd Hirsch	The Fabelmans	2022	March 15, 1935	January 24, 2023	
3	84 years, 10 days	Robert Duvall	The Judge	2014	January 5, 1931	January 15, 2015	Held record for 3 years (2015–2018)
4	82 years, 339 days	Hal Holbrook	Into the Wild	2007	February 17, 1925	January 22, 2008	Held record for 7 years (2008–2015)
5	82 years, 289 days	Max von Sydow	Extremely Loud & Incredibly Close	2011	April 10, 1929	January 24, 2012	
6	82 years, 49 days	Ralph Richardson	Greystoke: The Legend of Tarzan, Lord of the Apes	1984	December 19, 1902	February 6, 1985	Posthumous nomination Held record for 23 years (1985–2008)
7	82 years, 42 days	Christopher Plummer	Beginners	2011	December 13, 1929	January 24, 2012	Winner
8	82 years, 13 days	Anthony Hopkins	The Two Popes	2019	December 31, 1937	January 13, 2020	
9	80 years, 159 days	Robert De Niro	Killers of the Flower Moon	2023	August 17, 1943	January 23, 2024	
10	80 years, 51 days	Christopher Plummer	The Last Station	2009	December 13, 1929	February 2, 2010	

=== Youngest winners ===
Rank	Age	Name	Film	Year in Film	Date of Birth	Date of Award	Notes
1	20 years, 227 days	Timothy Hutton	Ordinary People	1980	August 16, 1960	March 31, 1981	Has held record for 45 years (1981–present)
2	29 years, 81 days	Cuba Gooding Jr.	Jerry Maguire	1996	January 2, 1968	March 24, 1997	
3	29 years, 205 days	George Chakiris	West Side Story	1961	September 16, 1932	April 9, 1962	Held record for 19 years (1962–1981)
4	29 years, 324 days	Heath Ledger	The Dark Knight	2008	April 4, 1979	February 22, 2009	Posthumous award
5	31 years, 42 days	Jack Lemmon	Mister Roberts	1955	February 8, 1925	March 21, 1956	Held record for 6 years (1956–1962)
6	31 years, 234 days	Robert De Niro	The Godfather Part II	1974	August 17, 1943	April 8, 1975	
7	32 years, 60 days	Daniel Kaluuya	Judas and the Black Messiah	2020	February 24, 1989	April 25, 2021	
8	33 years, 58 days	Harold Russell	The Best Years of Our Lives	1946	January 14, 1914	March 13, 1947	Held record for 9 years (1947–1956)
9	34 years, 34 days	Benicio del Toro	Traffic	2000	February 19, 1967	March 25, 2001	
10	34 years, 81 days	Van Heflin	Johnny Eager	1942	December 13, 1908	March 4, 1943	Held record for 4 years (1943–1947)

=== Youngest nominees ===
Rank	Age	Name	Film	Year in Film	Date of Birth	Date of Nomination	Notes
1	8 years, 276 days	Justin Henry	Kramer vs. Kramer	1979	May 25, 1971	February 25, 1980	Youngest nominee in any category Has held record for 46 years (1980–present)
2	11 years, 311 days	Haley Joel Osment	The Sixth Sense	1999	April 10, 1988	February 15, 2000	
3	11 years, 312 days	Brandon deWilde	Shane	1953	April 9, 1942	February 15, 1954	Held record for 26 years (1954–1980)
4	16 years, 147 days	Jack Wild	Oliver!	1968	September 30, 1952	February 24, 1969	
5	17 years, 39 days	Sal Mineo	Rebel Without a Cause	1955	January 10, 1939	February 18, 1956	
6	18 years, 176 days	River Phoenix	Running on Empty	1988	August 23, 1970	February 15, 1989	
7	19 years, 90 days	Leonardo DiCaprio	What's Eating Gilbert Grape	1993	November 11, 1974	February 9, 1994	
8	20 years, 43 days	Lucas Hedges	Manchester by the Sea	2016	December 12, 1996	January 24, 2017	
9	20 years, 185 days	Timothy Hutton	Ordinary People	1980	August 16, 1960	February 17, 1981	Winner
10	22 years, 48 days	Sal Mineo	Exodus	1960	January 10, 1939	February 27, 1961	

== Best Actress in a Supporting Role ==
Source: "Academy Award Statistics: Acting: Oldest/Youngest Winners and Nominees for Acting, By Category: Actress [in a Supporting Role]", AMPAS Awards Database

=== Oldest winners ===
Rank	Age	Name	Film	Year in Film	Date of Birth	Date of Award	Notes
1	77 years, 93 days	Peggy Ashcroft	A Passage to India	1984	December 22, 1907	March 25, 1985	Has held record for 41 years (1985–present)
2	75 years, 185 days	Amy Madigan	Weapons	2025	September 11, 1950	March 15, 2026	
3	74 years, 85 days	Josephine Hull	Harvey	1950	January 3, 1877	March 29, 1951	Held record for 34 years (1951–1985)
4	73 years, 310 days	Youn Yuh-jung	Minari	2020	June 19, 1947	April 25, 2021	
5	72 years, 166 days	Ruth Gordon	Rosemary's Baby	1968	October 30, 1896	April 14, 1969	
6	71 years, 338 days	Margaret Rutherford	The V.I.P.s	1963	May 11, 1892	April 13, 1964	
7	70 years, 187 days	Helen Hayes	Airport	1970	October 10, 1900	April 15, 1971	
8	65 years, 212 days	Ethel Barrymore	None But the Lonely Heart	1944	August 15, 1879	March 15, 1945	Held record for 6 years (1945–1951)
9	64 years, 110 days	Jamie Lee Curtis	Everything Everywhere All at Once	2022	November 22, 1958	March 12, 2023	
10	64 years, 102 days	Judi Dench	Shakespeare in Love	1998	December 9, 1934	March 21, 1999	

=== Oldest nominees ===
Rank	Age	Name	Film	Year in Film	Date of Birth	Date of Nomination	Notes
1	87 years, 221 days	Gloria Stuart	Titanic	1997	July 4, 1910	February 10, 1998	Has held record for 28 years (1998–present)
2	87 years, 61 days	Judi Dench	Belfast	2021	December 9, 1934	February 8, 2022	
3	85 years, 87 days	Ruby Dee	American Gangster	2007	October 27, 1922	January 22, 2008	
4	84 years, 71 days	June Squibb	Nebraska	2013	November 6, 1929	January 16, 2014	
5	82 years, 257 days	Jessica Tandy	Fried Green Tomatoes	1991	June 7, 1909	February 19, 1992	Held record for 6 years (1992–1998)
6	82 years, 37 days	Eva Le Gallienne	Resurrection	1980	January 11, 1899	February 17, 1981	Held record for 11 years (1981–1992)
7	79 years, 26 days	Ann Sothern	The Whales of August	1987	January 22, 1909	February 17, 1988	
8	77 years, 234 days	May Whitty	Mrs. Miniver	1942	June 19, 1865	February 8, 1943	Held record for 38 years (1943–1981)
9	77 years, 46 days	Peggy Ashcroft	A Passage to India	1984	December 22, 1907	February 6, 1985	Winner
10	77 years, 15 days	Edith Evans	The Chalk Garden	1964	February 8, 1888	February 23, 1965	

=== Youngest winners ===
Rank	Age	Name	Film	Year in Film	Date of Birth	Date of Award	Notes
1	10 years, 148 days	Tatum O'Neal	Paper Moon	1973	November 5, 1963	April 2, 1974	Youngest winner in any competitive category Has held record for 52 years (1974–present)
2	11 years, 240 days	Anna Paquin	The Piano	1993	July 24, 1982	March 21, 1994	
3	16 years, 115 days	Patty Duke	The Miracle Worker	1962	December 14, 1946	April 8, 1963	Held record for 11 years (1963–1974)
4	23 years, 310 days	Anne Baxter	The Razor's Edge	1946	May 7, 1923	March 13, 1947	Held record for 16 years (1947–1963)
5	24 years, 128 days	Teresa Wright	Mrs. Miniver	1942	October 27, 1918	March 4, 1943	Held record for 4 years (1943–1947)
6	24 years, 137 days	Goldie Hawn	Cactus Flower	1969	November 21, 1945	April 7, 1970	
7	24 years, 296 days	Angelina Jolie	Girl, Interrupted	1999	June 4, 1975	March 26, 2000	
8	25 years, 166 days	Jennifer Hudson	Dreamgirls	2006	September 12, 1981	February 25, 2007	
9	27 years, 17 days	Shirley Jones	Elmer Gantry	1960	March 31, 1934	April 17, 1961	
10	27 years, 148 days	Alicia Vikander	The Danish Girl	2015	October 3, 1988	February 28, 2016	

=== Youngest nominees ===
Rank	Age	Name	Film	Year in Film	Date of Birth	Date of Nomination	Notes
1	10 years, 106 days	Tatum O'Neal	Paper Moon	1973	November 5, 1963	February 19, 1974	Winner; Has held record for 52 years (1974–present)
2	10 years, 141 days	Mary Badham	To Kill a Mockingbird	1962	October 7, 1952	February 25, 1963	Held record for 11 years (1963–1974)
3	10 years, 192 days	Quinn Cummings	The Goodbye Girl	1977	August 13, 1967	February 21, 1978	
4	10 years, 284 days	Abigail Breslin	Little Miss Sunshine	2006	April 14, 1996	January 23, 2007	
5	11 years, 181 days	Patty McCormack	The Bad Seed	1956	August 21, 1945	February 18, 1957	Held record for 6 years (1957–1963)
6	11 years, 200 days	Anna Paquin	The Piano	1993	July 24, 1982	February 9, 1994	Winner
7	13 years, 285 days	Saoirse Ronan	Atonement	2007	April 12, 1994	January 22, 2008	
8	14 years, 5 days	Bonita Granville	These Three	1936	February 2, 1923	February 7, 1937	Held record for 20 years (1937–1957)
9	14 years, 45 days	Hailee Steinfeld	True Grit	2010	December 11, 1996	January 25, 2011	
10	14 years, 83 days	Jodie Foster	Taxi Driver	1976	November 19, 1962	February 10, 1977	

== Honorary Awards ==
Source: "Academy Award Statistics: Acting: Oldest/Youngest Winners and Nominees for Acting, By Category: Acting Honorary Award Winners", AMPAS Awards Database

=== Academy Honorary Award ===
==== Oldest honorees ====
Rank	Age	Name	Film	Year in Film	Date of Birth	Date of Award	Notes
1	98 years, 137 days	Robert F. Boyle		2007	October 10, 1909	February 24, 2008	Has held record for 18 years (2008–present)
2	97 years, 195 days	Mel Brooks		2023	June 28, 1926	January 9, 2024	
3	94 years, 341 days	Eli Wallach		2010	December 7, 1915	November 13, 2010	
4	94 years, 83 days	Maureen O'Hara		2014	August 17, 1920	November 8, 2014	
5	93 years, 334 days	Cicely Tyson		2018	December 19, 1924	November 18, 2018	
6	92 years, 86 days	Hal Roach		1983	January 14, 1892	April 9, 1984	Held record for 24 years (1984–2008)
7	91 years, 248 days	Quincy Jones		2024	March 14, 1933	November 17, 2024	Posthumous award
8	91 years, 74 days	Lina Wertmüller		2019	August 14, 1928	October 27, 2019	
9	90 years, 336 days	Anne V. Coates		2016	December 12, 1925	November 12, 2016	
10	89 years, 338 days	Elaine May		2021	April 21, 1932	March 25, 2022	

==== Oldest acting honorees ====
Rank	Age	Name	Film	Year in Film	Date of Birth	Date of Award	Notes
1	94 years, 341 days	Eli Wallach		2010	December 7, 1915	November 13, 2010	Has held record for 16 years (2010–present)
2	94 years, 83 days	Maureen O'Hara		2014	August 17, 1920	November 8, 2014	
3	93 years, 334 days	Cicely Tyson		2018	December 19, 1924	November 18, 2018	
4	88 years, 31 days	Angela Lansbury		2013	October 16, 1925	November 16, 2013	
5	85 years, 235 days	Myrna Loy		1990	August 2, 1905	March 25, 1991	Held record for 19 years (1991–2010)
6	85 years, 148 days	Gena Rowlands		2015	June 19, 1930	November 14, 2015	
7	85 years, 59 days	Lauren Bacall		2009	September 16, 1924	November 14, 2009	
8	83 years, 356 days	Mary Pickford		1975	April 8, 1892	March 29, 1976	Held record for 15 years (1976–1991)
9	83 years, 182 days	Groucho Marx		1973	October 2, 1890	April 2, 1974	Held record for 2 years (1974–1976)
10	83 years, 99 days	Liv Ullmann		2021	December 16, 1938	March 25, 2022	

=== Honorary Juvenile Award ===
==== Youngest honorees ====
Rank	Age	Name	Film	Year in Film	Date of Birth	Date of Award	Notes
1	6 years, 310 days	Shirley Temple		1934	April 23, 1928	February 27, 1935	Has held record for 91 years (1935–present)
2	7 years, 91 days	Vincent Winter	The Little Kidnappers	1954	December 29, 1947	March 30, 1955	
3	8 years, 59 days	Margaret O'Brien	Meet Me in St. Louis	1944	January 15, 1937	March 15, 1945	
4	10 years, 39 days	Jon Whiteley	The Little Kidnappers	1954	February 19, 1945	March 30, 1955	
5	12 years, 59 days	Ivan Jandl	The Search	1948	January 24, 1937	March 24, 1949	
6	12 years, 167 days	Claude Jarman Jr.	The Yearling	1946	September 27, 1934	March 13, 1947	
7	13 years, 20 days	Bobby Driscoll		1949	March 3, 1937	March 23, 1950	
8	14 years, 32 days	Peggy Ann Garner	A Tree Grows in Brooklyn	1945	February 3, 1932	March 7, 1946	
9	14 years, 364 days	Hayley Mills	Pollyanna	1960	April 18, 1946	April 17, 1961	
10	17 years, 81 days	Deanna Durbin		1938	December 4, 1921	February 23, 1939	

== See also ==
- Academy Juvenile Award
- Academy of Motion Picture Arts and Sciences (AMPAS)
- List of Academy Award records
- List of actors with Academy Award nominations
- List of actors with more than one Academy Award nomination in the acting categories
- List of actors with two or more Academy Awards in acting categories
- List of people who have won multiple Academy Awards in a single year
- List of posthumous Academy Award winners and nominees
- List of superlative Academy Award winners and nominees
- List of Millennial Academy Award winners and nominees
- List of Generation Z Academy Award winners and nominees
