= The Spanish Gardener =

The Spanish Gardener may refer to:

- The Spanish Gardener (novel), 1950 novel
- The Spanish Gardener (film), 1956 film based on the novel
