= National Theatre School of Canada =

College located in Montreal, Quebec, Canada

Coordinates: 45.5091°N 73.5625°W

- École nationale de théâtre du Canada
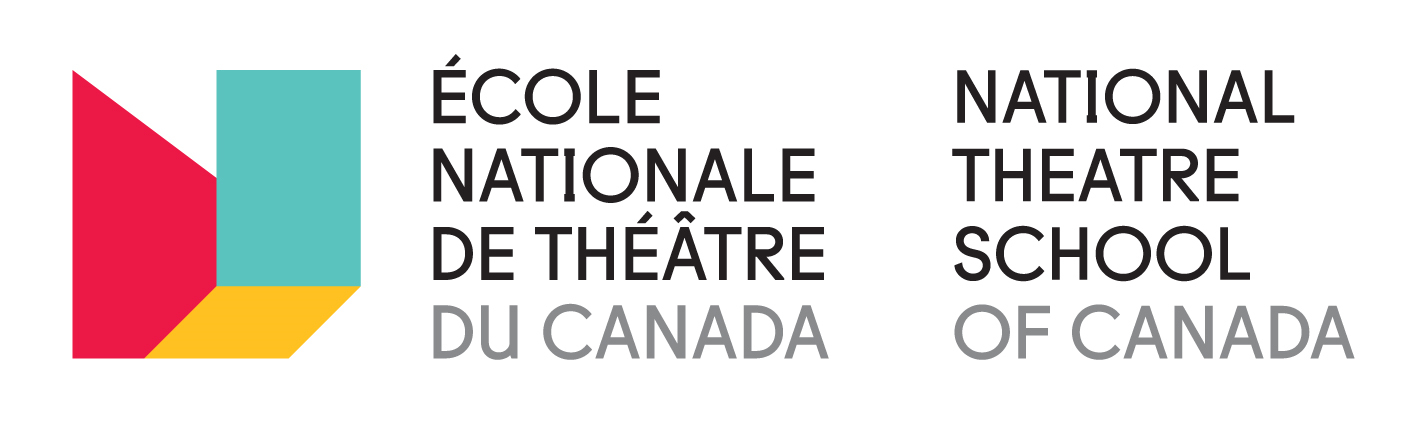
- Type: Theatre school
- Established: 1960
- Affiliations: Colleges and Institutes Canada
- CEO: Fanny Pagé
- Students: 169 (in 2016-17 year)
- Location: Montreal, Quebec, Canada
- Campus: Urban
- Website: www.ent-nts.ca

The National Theatre School of Canada (NTS, French: École nationale de théâtre du Canada) is a private institution of professional theatre studies in Montreal, Quebec. Established in 1960, the NTS receives its principal funding from grants awarded by the Government of Canada and cultural ministries in each province, with added financial support from private and corporate donors. It offers training to actors, directors, playwrights, set and costume designers and production specialists to work in the professional theatre industry.

== Buildings and features ==
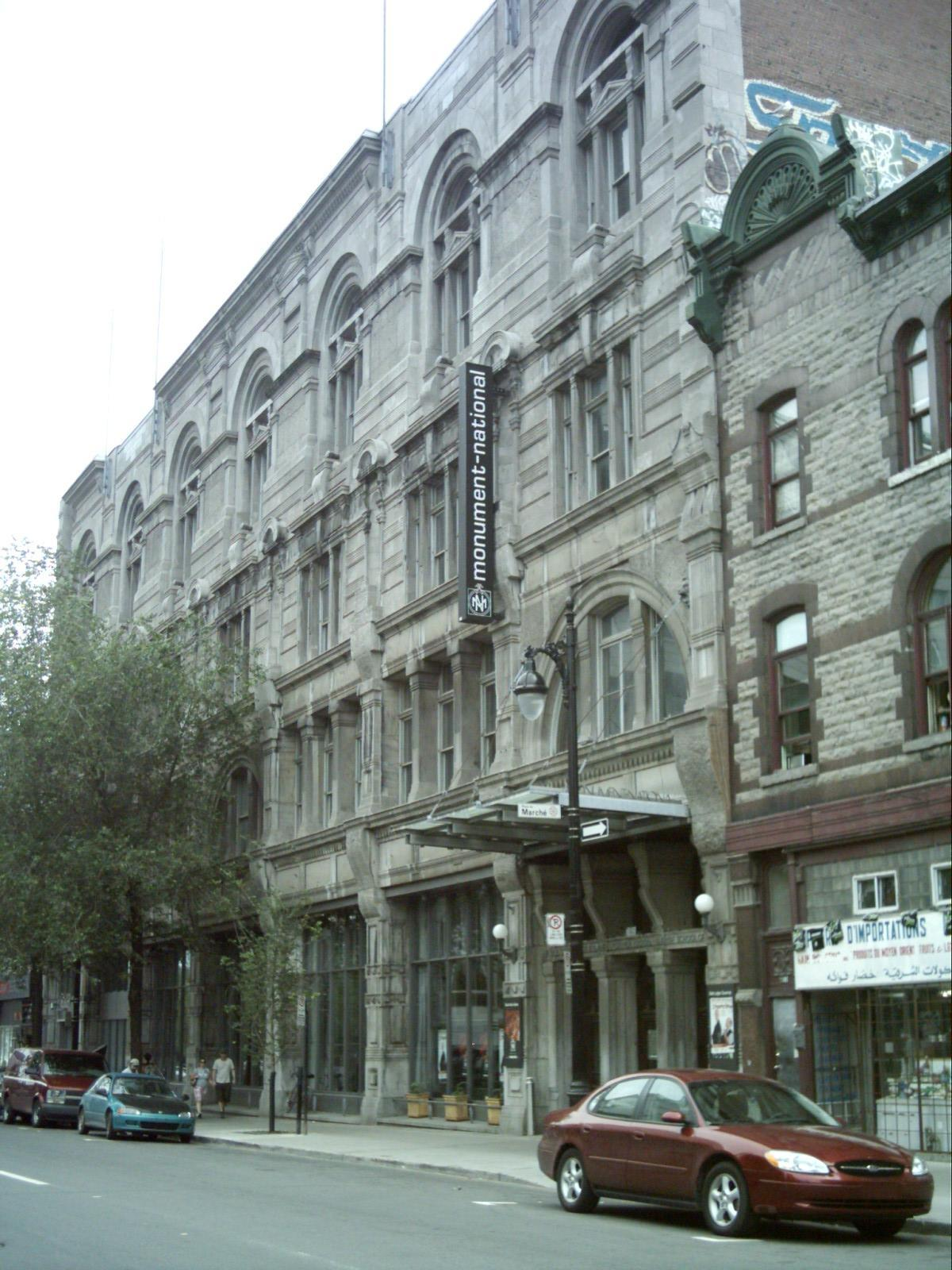
The Monument-National in 2008

The National Theatre School occupies a historic landmark in Montreal, the Monument-National on Boulevard Saint-Laurent, and a building in Le Plateau district at the corner of Rue Saint-Denis and Avenue Laurier.

=== Monument-National ===
The campus of the National Theatre School stretches all the way to the Monument-National in the core of downtown Montreal. This hundred-year-old theatre, owned and operated by the NTS, has been classified as a heritage building. Recently restored and renovated, the Monument-National is composed of three performance halls.

=== Michel and Suria Saint-Denis Pavilion ===
Once a juvenile courthouse, the school's main home, the Michel and Suria Saint-Denis Pavilion, sits on the border between the Plateau Mont-Royal and Mile End neighbourhoods.

The Pavilion houses rehearsal halls, classrooms (including specially converted spaces for voice, dance, movement, set and costume design and writing), the André-Pagé Studio (a flexible studio space with a 150-seat capacity), the Pauline McGibbon Studio (80-seat capacity), a small costume shop, a sound studio, a lighting laboratory, a projection room, a computer room, a school supplies store, a cafeteria, and a common space equipped with refrigerators and microwaves for the students.

==== The Bleviss Family Library ====
The Pavilion also houses Canada's largest collection of theatre related books and manuscripts, both published and unpublished, and audio visual materials available in both official languages. This outstanding collection was founded by Alan Bleviss, a graduate of NTS.

== History ==
The notion of a national theatre school first received focused attention as an indirect result of the "Massey Report" (the report of the Massey-Levesque Royal Commission on National Development in the Arts, Letters and Sciences of 1951). Robertson Davies, writing the section of the report devoted to theatre, complained that "facilities for advanced training in the arts of the theatre are non-existent in Canada," and that, consequently, "young actors, producers and technicians [...] must leave the country for advanced training, and only rarely return." Notwithstanding widespread acknowledgement of the validity of Davies' complaint, not until 1958-59 was a committee of 16 of the leading members of the Canadian theatrical community formed through the Canadian Theatre Centre / Centre du théâtre Canadien (CTC). Actor and CBC television producer, David Gardner chaired the committee that included Colonel Yves Bourassa, Donald Davis, Jean Gascon, Gratien Gélinas, Michael Langham, Pauline McGibbon, Mavor Moore, David Onley, Tom Patterson, Jean Pelletier, Jean-Louis Roux, Roy Stewart, Powys Thomas, Vincent Tovell and Herbert Whittaker. Director-teacher Michel Saint-Denis was brought in from Britain to act as senior advisor. He was a leading authority on theatre training who had created the Bristol Old Vic Theatre School and later co-founded the Juilliard School Drama Division in New York City.

In fact, French-born Saint-Denis had what many regarded as an ideal background to offer guidance to Canada's national co-lingual theatre school project (he gives details of his employment as a consultant for this project, and the involvement of his wife Suria, in their co-authored book "Training for the Theatre: Premises and Promises"). In the 1920s, he worked closely with his uncle, the remarkable French theatre director Jacques Copeau, to revolutionize theatrical practice and training in France through the Vieux-Colombier troupe. In the 1930s, Saint-Denis moved to London, England, where he became one of the most highly regarded stage directors of the decade, being responsible for a series of landmark productions featuring such stars of the British stage as John Gielgud, Laurence Olivier and Alec Guinness.

The CTC committee had been formed with a mandate to create a "truly bilingual school, located in Toronto." The committee decided that Montréal, as a more "truly bilingual" city, was a better location and the National Theatre School of Canada / École nationale de théâtre du Canada officially opened on 2 Nov 1960 in premises owned by the Canadian Legion at 1191 rue Mountain in Montréal. The school changed locations several times over the next decade until in 1970 it settled at 5030 rue Saint-Denis. Beginning in 1965, it also rented performing space in the Monument-National, which it purchased outright in 1978. This historic theatre (built 1891-94) was then in a dilapidated state; a major renovation in the early 1990s restored the beauty of the old Monument-National and introduced many modernizations, resulting in 2 theatres- the 804-seat Ludger-Duvernay theatre and a smaller flexible Studio theatre, which seats as many as 180 spectators.

Founding principals, Jean Gascon was the first Director-General (Principal) at the NTS and head of the school's Francophone programs while Powys Thomas headed up the English programming section. James de Beaujeu Domville took over the role of Director-General from 1964 until 1968.

In 1960, the first year of its operation, the National Theatre School only offered classes in acting for its Francophone and English students. They had been selected from hundreds of auditions conducted in every province and territory across the country to participate in thirty months of rigorous training conducted over three years, with eight months annually spent in Montreal and the two summer months in Stratford, Ontario, where students were afforded access to the facilities and professional influences of the Stratford Shakespeare Festival. In 1961, a bilingual production program was inaugurated. In 1978, a French program in playwriting was added to the French acting section of the school and in 1980, an equivalent English playwriting program was added to its English acting section. Directing has been the most changeable program at the school. Beginning in the early 1980s, various attempts were made to create programs in English and French for the instruction of directing; but for both financial and pedagogical reasons, these programs have not always succeeded, and the English and French sections of the school have apparently abandoned the pursuit of synchronized objectives in this area. Indeed, while the integration of anglophone and francophone students has been fairly thorough in the production program, in other programs it has been more usual to see the English and French sections of the school operating autonomously.

While the history of the National Theatre School has generally been prestigious, the institution has not been without controversy. For example, in 1968, which was dubbed "the year of the barricades" because of the many student protests that swept across Europe and North America, the National Theatre School experienced its own uprising. The 8 graduating acting students in the French section resigned en masse in protest against the school's disregard of Québécois playwrights, particularly as exemplified in statements made by the director of the French acting section, André Muller. As a result of the protest, the school pointedly reversed its neglect of Québécois plays. In 1971, Muller's successor, André Pagé, had the students perform a selection of work from various Québécois writers and began a program of commissioning work for the school from prominent Québécois playwrights. In 1998, the 8 students who had resigned were sent a letter from the school declaring that they had been reinstated as alumni and recognizing that their protest had resulted in progressive change in school policy.

== Programs ==
It offers professional training in all the major theatre arts in both English and French, making it one of the only co-lingual theatre schools in the world. The programs include Acting, Directing, Production, Playwriting and Scenography.

== Intake ==
Students are auditioned and/or interviewed from all across the country, and NTS accepts international students as well. Placements at the school are highly competitive. The Acting program auditions around six hundred students annually but they only accept 10-12, while the Playwriting program accepts only 2 students per year.

== Notable alumni ==
The National Theatre School typically graduates approx. 60 students a year from its combined programs and English and French sections, and its alumni include Canada's prominent theatre artists with an influence that extends deep into the US and European worlds of theatre, television and film.

The following is a list of notable students and the year they graduated.

- Salvatore Antonio (1998) - Actor, playwright
- Marc Bendavid (2004) - Actor
- Alan Bleviss (1966) - Actor, director, founder Bleviss Family Library
- Ishan Davé (2011) - Actor
- Blair Brown (1969) - Actress (Altered States, The Days and Nights of Molly Dodd, Fringe)
- Marilyn Castonguay - Actor
- Peter Cullen (1963) - Actor
- Sean Devine (1992) - Actor, playwright, and politician
- Roy Dupuis (1986) - Actor
- Jesse Aaron Dwyre (2003) - Actor
- Jake Epstein (2008) - Actor
- Colm Feore (1980) - Actor
- Gary Files (1964) Actor, Writer, Director
- Colin Fox - Actor
- Jonathan Goad - Actor, Director (Stratford Shakespeare Festival, Republic of Doyle)
- Humberly González, actress
- Luba Goy (1969) - Comedian (Royal Canadian Air Farce)
- Suzanne Grossmann (1963) - Actress, Writer
- Lori Hallier (1980) - Actress
- Elizabeth Hanna (1977) - Voice Actor and speech-language pathologist
- Paul Hecht (1963) - Actor
- Martha Henry (1962) - Actress and director, first graduate
- Allan Hawco (2000) - Actor/Writer/Producer (Republic of Doyle) (Gascon Thomas Award winner)
- Sheila Heti (1997) - Writer
- Michael Hogan (1947) - Actor
- Stephen Joffe (2012) - Actor, singer
- John Juliani (1964) - Director, actor
- Luke Kirby (2000) - Actor (The Marvelous Mrs. Maisel)
- Heath Lamberts (1963) - Actor
- Stephen Lawson (2003) - Actor (2boys.tv)
- Diana Leblanc (1963) - Actress and director
- Ann-Marie MacDonald (1980) - Actress, playwright, novelist, teacher and broadcast hostess
- Anita Majumdar (2004) - Actress and playwright
- Kari Matchett (1993) - Actress (Power Play)
- William "Bill" Millerd (1968) - Director, producer, Artistic Director of The Arts Club Theatre Company, Vancouver
- Hannah Moscovitch (2001) - Playwright (East of Berlin)
- Wajdi Mouawad (1991) Actor, writer, director; artistic director of National Arts Centre French Theatre
- Sandra Oh (1993) - Actress (Grey's Anatomy, Killing Eve) (Golden Globe and Gascon Thomas Award winner)
- Peter Oldring (1996) - Actor (Blue Collar TV, The Joe Blow Show)
- David Paquet (1978) - Playwright
- Lucy Peacock (1983) - Actress (Stratford Shakespeare Festival)
- Cara Pifko (1994) - Actress (This is Wonderland)
- Sean Power (1992) - Actor (Lead Balloon)
- Amy Price-Francis (1988) - Actress
- Francine Racette (1966) - actress
- Noah Reid (2008) - Actor (Schitt's Creek)
- Donnelly Rhodes (1963) - Actor
- August Schellenberg - Actor
- Coralee Elliott Testar (1963) - Screenwriter (The Little Kidnappers, City Boy, Caddie Woodlawn, A Girl of the Limberlost and other works)
- Judith Thompson (1979) - Playwright (Perfect Pie)
- Alicia Thorgrimsson (1996) - Actor
- Darrell Wasyk (1979) - Director, filmmaker (H)
- Gina Wilkinson (1979) - Actress
- Kari-Lynn Winters (1994) - Children's author (Jeffrey and Sloth), literacy researcher

== See also ==
- Ontario National Theatre School DramaFest
