= The Little Kidnappers =

The Little Kidnappers may refer to:

- The Kidnappers, a 1953 British film known as The Little Kidnappers on its 1954 American release
- The Little Kidnappers (1990 film), a Canadian/American television film remake of the above
