= Nicholas (TV series) =

- Nicolas
- Directed by: Julio Gouveia
- Starring: Ricardinho; Roberto de Cleto; Rafael Golombeck
- Country of origin: Brazil

Original release
- Network: TV Tupi
- Release: 1958

Nicholas is a 1958 Brazilian telenovela adapted from A. J. Cronin's 1950 novel, The Spanish Gardener. The series was directed by Julio Gouveia, the head of The Theatre School of São Paulo. It starred Ricardinho as Nicholas, and Roberto de Cleto as the gardener. The British film adaptation was released in 1956, and TV Tupi broadcast another Brazilian adaptation of Cronin's novel in 1967.
