= O Jardineiro Espanhol =

1967 Brazilian telenovela

- Directed by: Fabio Sabag
- Starring: Ednei Giovenazzi; Osmano Cardoso
- Country of origin: Brazil

Original release
- Network: TV Tupi
- Release: 3 April – 3 May 1967

O Jardineiro Espanhol is a 1967 Brazilian telenovela that is based on A. J. Cronin's 1950 novel The Spanish Gardener. The series was written by Tatiana Belinky and directed by Fabio Sabag. It starred Ednei Giovenazzi as Nicholas, and Osmano Cardoso as the gardener. Other actors included Ana Rosa, João José Pompeo, Marcus Toledo, and Paulo Villaça. The British film adaptation was released in 1956, and TV Tupi originally broadcast another Brazilian adaptation of Cronin's novel in 1958.
