= Steve Lawson =

Steve Lawson may refer to:

- Steven F. Lawson (born 1945), American historian of the civil rights movement
- Steve Lawson (musician) (born 1972), British bass guitarist
- Steve Lawson (American football) (born 1949), American football guard
- Steve Lawson (baseball) (born 1950), Major League Baseball pitcher
- Steve Lawson (footballer) (born 1994) Togolese footballer
- Stephen Lawson (born 1968), Zimbabwean cricketer
- Steve Lawson (speedway rider) (born 1957), English speedway rider
- Stephen Lawson, Canadian artist
