= Alicia Thorgrimsson =

Canadian actress

Alicia Thorgrimsson is a Canadian actress. Born to a Canadian father and a Guyanese mother. A graduate of the National Theatre School of Canada's Acting program (1996), Alicia has appeared in Fantastic Four: Rise of the Silver Surfer, Stargate SG-1, Da Vinci's Inquest, Three Moons Over Milford, Jeremiah, Exes & Ohs, The 4400, The L Word, the NBC pilot Bionic Woman, and Continuum. Other credits include Cold Squad, Nightman, and Millennium.

Thorgrimsson completed courses in screenwriting at The College of Marin in Marin County, California. In 2011, she received an honorable mention from the 2011 Expo Screenplay Competition for her feature-length screenplay Who Shot Hinkus, and in 2019 Alicia was an Austin Film Festival Script Competition Second Rounder for her feature-length screenplay The Good Star.

Thorgrimsson was a boarding student at The Bishop Strachan School from 1981 to 1983.

== Filmography ==
Year	Title	Role	Notes
2007	Fantastic Four: Rise of the Silver Surfer	New York Pedestrian	
