= Alan Bleviss =

Canadian–American voice actor (1941–2017)

Alan David Bleviss (August 6, 1941 – December 30, 2017) was a Canadian born voice actor who had been a resident of the United States since 1976. In 1991, he was described as one of the "top names" in the business. His voice over career spanned nearly four decades. He was a past president of the Civil War Token Society.

== Life and career ==
Bleviss was born and raised in Edmonton, where his father owned several theaters and a cigar store. He was educated at the University of Alberta and the National Theatre School of Canada. He lived in the New York City area at the height of his career from the late 1970s to the early 1990s, and died at his home in New York City on December 30, 2017.

Bleviss did voice over work for the coming attraction trailers for hundreds of Hollywood movies, especially those made by Miramax His corporate clients included American Express, AT&T, Canada Dry, Enterprise Rent-a-Car and Kodak. He did political work for the National Abortion Rights Action League and many Democratic Party campaigns, including the 1988 campaign of Michael Dukakis for president.

Bleviss won six Clio awards. Among the earliest was a 1971 TV ad for Heinz Tomato Juice, which used a celery stick to emphasize how thick the product is.

In 1992, Bleviss developed Chronic inflammatory demyelinating polyneuropathy, which led to partial paralysis and damage to his voice. He barely worked for 20 years, although therapy eventually allowed him to regain professional use of his voice.

Bleviss served on the board of directors of the National Theatre School of Canada, and funded scholarships and a student theatre facility at the University of Alberta.

Bleviss is the inspiration for a sandwich called "The Edmonton" at Shopsins, a diner in Manhattan. It is a tuna and avocado sandwich on garlic bread. He is a well-known collector of Civil War tokens, unofficial currency of the early 1860s. In 2009, he auctioned off 500 items from his collection, described by the auctioneer as "one of the most extensive holdings ever assembled".
