= Ivan Jandl =

Czech child actor (1937–1987)

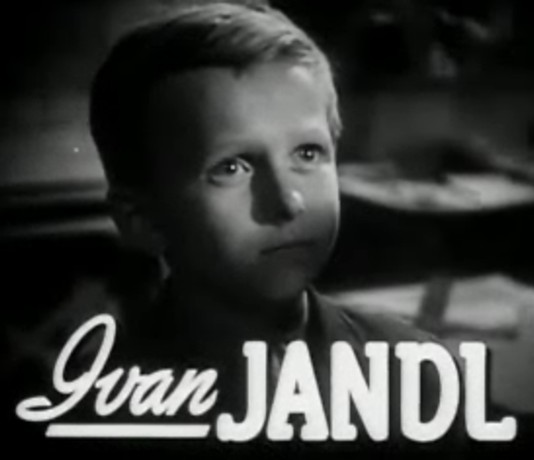
- Trailer for The Search (1948)
- Born: 24 January 1937; Prague, Czechoslovakia
- Died: 21 November 1987 (aged 50); Prague, Czechoslovakia
- Resting place: Vyšehrad Cemetery
- Occupation: Actor
- Years active: 1946–1950

Ivan Jandl (24 January 1937 – 21 November 1987) was a Czech child actor.

== Career ==
He appeared in the 1948 film The Search as a nine-year-old Czechoslovak boy who had survived Auschwitz and was searching for his mother in post-war Germany. The movie was filmed on location in Germany and at a studio in Zurich, Switzerland, from June to November, 1947. The boy spoke no English and had to learn his lines phonetically. He was awarded an Academy Juvenile Award for his work, but was not permitted by the then communist government of Czechoslovakia to travel to the USA to accept it. At the Academy Awards ceremony in 1949, his Oscar was accepted on stage on his behalf by the director of The Search, Fred Zinnemann. He was also awarded a Golden Globe for his performance in the film and both statuettes are now preserved in the Czech National Film Archive. He appeared in some Czech films in 1949 and 1950, then left acting to continue his studies. He tried unsuccessfully to continue his acting career in his late teens, and eventually found work in radio.

== Death ==
Jandl died from complications of diabetes in Prague in 1987, aged 50. The minor planet 37736 Jandl is named after him. Thirty years after his death, on 9 January 2017, the ashes of Jandl were transferred to the Vyšehrad Cemetery, the final resting place of many Czechoslovak personalities, thanks to the efforts of the Actors' Life Foundation (Život umělce) with the support of the Czech Actors' Association (Herecká asociace).

== Filmography ==
| Year | Film | Role | Other notes |
|---|---|---|---|
| 1946 | Varúj...! | A boy reciting the Lord's Prayer in Hungarian. | Czechoslovak film |
| 1948 | The Search | Karel Malik | Winner, Academy Juvenile Award; Winner, Golden Globe Award for Best Juvenile Actor |
| 1948 | Zelená knížka | Jarek | Czechoslovak film |
| 1948 | Svědomí | Lojzek | Czechoslovak film |
| 1950 | Vítězná křídla | Boy | Czechoslovak film |
