= Coralee Elliott Testar =

Canadian producer and screenwriter

Coralee Elliott Testar UE (born February 1942 in Prince Edward Island; died September 2023 in Vancouver British Columbia) was a Vancouver based producer and screenwriter. She was a graduate of the National Theatre School of Canada. Her many credits include the award-winning The Little Kidnappers (Disney), "City Boy" (Bonneville/PBS) based on the novel Freckles, and the television adaptation of Girl of the Limberlost (PBS).

Testar was a past president of the British Columbia Motion Picture Industry Association and a lifetime member of the Writers Guild of Canada.
