= Leopold Borkowski =

Polish actor

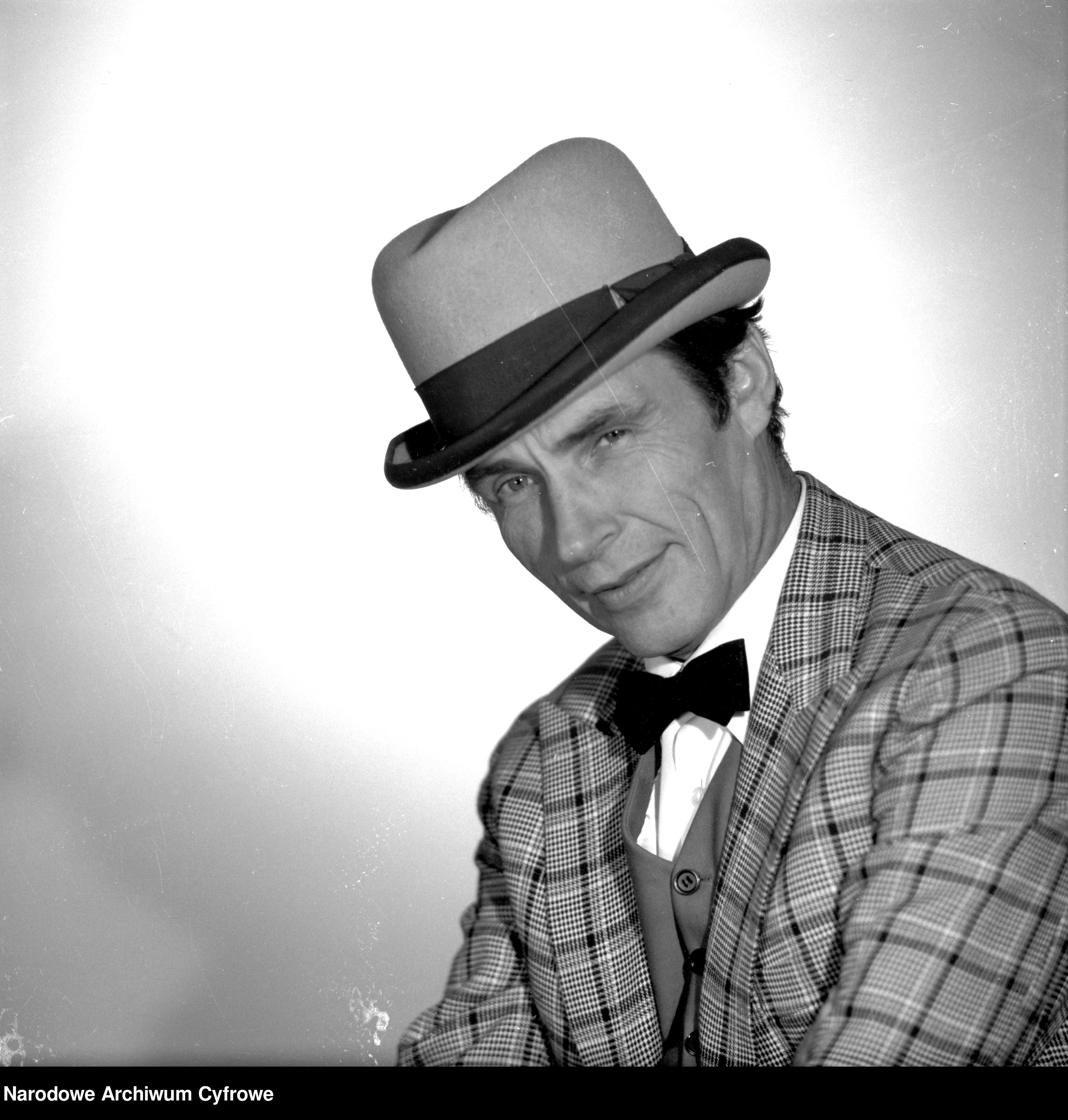
- Born: 15 August 1919; Lublin, Second Polish Republic
- Died: 15 December 2001 (aged 82); Warsaw, Poland

Leopold Borkowski (15 August 1919 – 15 December 2001) was a Polish actor.

== Filmography ==
Year	Title	Role
1979	Racławice. 1794	
1981	The longest war of modern Europe	(episode 4-5)

== Theater ==
- 1948: The Marriage of Figaro (author: Pierre Beaumarchais, directed by Czesław Strzelecki) as Bazyli
- 1949: Cottage behind the village (author: Zygmunt Noskowski, directed by Czesław Strzelecki) as Tumry
- 1949: Beautiful Helena (author: Jacques Offenbach, directed by: Kazimierz Dembowski) as Achilles
- 1949: Romance with vaudeville (author: Władysław Krzemiński, directed by: Kazimierz Dembowski) as Witold
- 1950: Gypsy Baron (author: Johann Strauss (son), directed by: Kazimierz Dembowski) as General Piotr Homonay
- 1950: The New Year begins (by: Jan Brzechwa, directed by: Klima Krymkowa) as Murarz I
- 1951: Cheerful duel (author: Joanna Gorczycka, directed by Zbigniew Sawan) as Jędrek
- 1951: Szapmostwa Skapena (author: Molier, directed by Zbigniew Sawan) as Leander
- 1952: Wachlarz (author: Carlo Goldoni, directed by Maryna Broniewska) as Tonino
- 1960: Barberyna (author: Alfred de Musset, directed by Stanisław Kwaskowski) as the Marshall of the Court
- 1961: Resurrection (author: Leo Tolstoy, directed by Adam Hanuszkiewicz) as Peasant II, Prisoner in prison, Judge II
- 1966: Nocna tale (author: Krzysztof Choiński, directed by Zbigniew Stok) as Inspector
- 1966: Egzamin (author: Jan Paweł Gawlik, directed by Zbigniew Mak) as Inspector
- 1967: Liar (author: Maurice Hannequin, directed by Zbigniew Mak) as a policeman
- 1967: Wassa Żelezowna (author: Maksim Gorki, directed by: Jolanta Zielińska) as Piatiorkin
- 1967: Ali Baba and 40 bandits (author: Janusz Kłosiński and Janusz Słowikowski, directed by: Przemysław Zieliński) as Herszt
- 1968: Born in a bonnet (author: Zdzisław Skowroński, directed by Stefania Domańska) as a Soviet director
- 1968: I ran away from the quail (author: Stefan Żeromski, director: Jolanta Ziemińska) as Wilkosz
- 1969: Szubrawc scrapbook (author: Aleksandr Ostrowski, directed by Stefania Domańska) as Mamajew, Mamajewo Servant
- 1969: A miracle of love, or Cracovians and highlanders (author: Wojciech Bogusławski, directed by Bohdan Głuszczak) as Wawrzyniec
- 1969: Świętoszek (author: Molier, directed by Stefania Domańska) as a Guard Officer
- 1970: Edward II (author: Christopher Marlowe, directed by Jan Błeszyński) as Lancaster, Matrevis
- 1973: Ferdynand Wspaniały (author: Ludwik Jerzy Kern, directed by Zbigniew Czeski) as the father
- 1975: Born in a bonnet (author: Zdzisław Skowroński, directed by Krystyna Sznerr) as a Soviet director
- 1976: Cafe pod Minogą (written by Stefan Wiechecki, directed by Tadeusz Cygler) as a German
- 1977: Snow White (by Jerzy Wittlin and Jerzy Rakowiecki, directed by Romuald Szejd) as Papluś
- 1978: Rape, what's going on! (author: Aleksander Fredro, directed by: Olga Lipińska)
