= Jon Whiteley =

Scottish child actor and art historian (1945–2020)

Jon James Lamont Whiteley
- Born: 19 February 1945; Monymusk, Scotland
- Died: 16 May 2020 (aged 75)
- Occupations: actor; art historian
- Years active: 1952-1957
- Spouse: Linda Whiteley
- Children: 2
- Awards: Academy Juvenile Award; Chevaliers of the Ordre des Arts et des Lettres

Jon James Lamont Whiteley (19 February 1945 – 16 May 2020) was a Scottish child film actor and in adult life a distinguished art historian.

== Life and career ==
The Monymusk-born Whiteley appeared in five films during his brief acting career, and it was for the second of these, The Kidnappers (US: The Little Kidnappers, 1953), that he, along with co-star Vincent Winter, was awarded an Academy Juvenile Award. He appeared in only three more films, including The Spanish Gardener (1956), before his film acting career was effectively put on hold when his mother insisted on him passing the eleven-plus exam. After appearing twice more for TV credits, his acting career ended.

Whiteley was educated at Pembroke College, Oxford, whereafter he became a respected art historian at the Ashmolean Museum in Oxford. He wrote his doctorate on the revival in painting of themes inspired by antiquity in mid-nineteenth-century France. He catalogued all the French Drawings in the Ashmolean, and authored and co-authored several books on artists including Ingres, Puvis de Chavannes and Claude Lorrain. He published a book on the Ashmolean's Stringed Instruments in 2009, and was working on a catalogue of the later French paintings in the Museum.

His wife was art historian Linda Whiteley; the couple had two children. He was made a chevalier (knight) of the French Order of Arts and Letters in May 2009. The cause of his death was Glioblastoma (also known as glioblastoma multiforme or GBM). This is the most aggressive type of cancerous brain tumour in adults. The date or location of his funeral is not known. He is buried in Botley cemetery, Oxford.

== Filmography ==
Year	Title	Role	Notes
1952	Hunted	Robbie	aka The Stranger in Between (USA)
1953	The Kidnappers (US: The Little Kidnappers)	Harry	Academy Juvenile Award
1955	Moonfleet	John Mohune	
1956	The Spanish Gardener	Nicholas Brande	
1956	The Weapon	Erik Jenner	
1957	The Adventures of Robin Hood	Davey	Episode - The Christmas Goose

== Works ==
- Jon Whiteley (1 March 2004), The Ashmolean Museum: Complete Illustrated Catalogue of Paintings, Ashmolean Museum, ISBN 978-1854441874
- Jon Whiteley (1 January 1989), Oxford and the Pre-Raphaelites, Ashmolean Handbooks (second ed.), Ashmolean Museum, ISBN 978-0907849940
- Jon Whiteley (July 1979), 19th Century European Drawings in the Ashmolean Museum, Ashmolean Museum, ISBN 978-0900090622
- Jon Whiteley (31 January 2011), Lucien Pissarro in England: The Eragny Press 1895-1914, Ashmolean Museum, ISBN 978-1854442536
- Jon Whiteley (28 December 2011), Claude Lorrain and the Poetry of Landscape, Lund Humphries Publishers Ltd
- Jon Whiteley (June 1977), Ingres, Hippocrene Books, ISBN 978-0846702498
