= The Kidnappers =

1953 film

The Little Kidnappers
- American poster
- Directed by: Philip Leacock
- Written by: Neil Paterson
- Produced by: Sergei Nolbandov; Leslie Parkyn
- Starring: Duncan Macrae; Jon Whiteley; Vincent Winter
- Cinematography: Eric Cross
- Edited by: John Trumper
- Music by: Bruce Montgomery
- Production company: Group Film Productions
- Distributed by: General Film Distributors
- Release date: 17 December 1953
- Running time: 93 minutes
- Country: United Kingdom
- Language: English

The Kidnappers (US: The Little Kidnappers) is a 1953 British film, directed by Philip Leacock and written by Neil Paterson.

The movie was financed by the Rank Organisation. According to producer Frank Godwin, J. Arthur Rank, chairman of Rank, "rarely expressed any feelings about individual films, but there was one film that he absolutely loved, The Kidnappers." He said John Davis, managing director of Rank, "would always refer to it as 'your movie, Arthur'."

"It was certainly the film I enjoyed the most," said director Leacock.

The Little Kidnappers has been called the best movie from Group Film Productions, Rank's main production arm in the 1950s.

== Plot ==
In the early 1900s, two young orphaned brothers, eight-year-old Harry and five-year-old Davy Mackenzie are sent to live at a Scottish settlement in Nova Scotia, Canada with their stern grandfather and grandmother after their father's death in the Boer War. The boys would love to have a dog but are not allowed, Grandaddy holding that "ye canna eat a dog". Then they find an abandoned baby. Living in fear of Grandaddy, who beats Harry for disobeying him, they conceal it from the adults. They view the baby as a kind of substitute for the dog that they have been denied; Davy asks his brother: "Shall we call the baby Rover, Harry?”

Grandaddy is having problems with the Dutch settlers who have arrived at the settlement in increasing numbers after leaving South Africa at the end of the Boer War. He has had a long-running dispute with Afrikaner Jan Hooft over ownership of a hill and refuses to accept a legal ruling that the land belongs to Hooft. He also keeps a close rein on his adult daughter Kirsty and is reluctant for her to make a life for herself. She is in love with the local doctor Willem Bloem, who left Holland for Canada for reasons he will not disclose. He does not seem to return her affections, but it transpires that this is because he thinks himself too old for her.

To make matters worse, it turns out that the "kidnapped" baby is Hooft's younger daughter. When found out, Harry is tried at a court set up in the local trading store. He is suspected of taking the baby as a result of the tensions between the two families but states that he did not know her identity. Surprisingly, Hooft speaks up in his defence, stating that no harm had come to her and his older daughter should have been looking after her, but also says that it was his and his wife's fault for putting too much responsibility on the older daughter. The court official suggests that Harry be sent to a corrective school, and is immediately threatened with shooting by Grandaddy. The clerk climbs down, merely suggesting an investigation into the location of these schools in case a further kidnapping should occur. Afterwards, Grandaddy thanks Hooft for speaking up for Harry.

The film ends with Grandaddy, who had never learned to read or write, instructing Harry to write to a mail order company to order the red setter they had set their hearts on. He had found the flyer for the dog in one of his best boots, where the boys had hidden it. They had noticed that he sometimes walked without these boots, slinging them over his shoulder, to save wear and tear. To pay for the dog, Grandaddy had sold them – a prized item among his few possessions. Davy is now able to say, "I think we'll call him Rover, Harry."

== Cast ==
- Duncan Macrae as Jim MacKenzie
- Jean Anderson as Grandma MacKenzie
- Adrienne Corri as Kirsty
- Theodore Bikel as Dr. Willem Bloem
- Jon Whiteley as Harry, Jim's grandson
- Vincent Winter as Davy, another grandson
- Francis de Wolff as Jan Hooft Sr.
- James Sutherland as Arron McNab
- John Rae as Andrew McCleod
- Jack Stewart as Dominie
- Jameson Clark as Tom Cameron
- Eric Woodburn as Sam Howie
- Christopher Beeny as Jan Hooft Jr.

== Production ==
The film was based on Neil Paterson's short story "Scotch Settlement". Paterson wrote the movie script in collaboration with director Philip Leacock, who had a seven year contract with Rank. The script added a love story involving a woman and a Boer doctor.

The film was made through Rank's main production arm at the time, Group Film Productions. All movies made by Group had to be approved by a board of directors, chaired by Michael Balcon. Leacock says the board initially turned down the script for the film. "At that time there was a strange relationship between Balcon and Rank," said Leacock. "Balcon was still at Ealing, he was head of a committee which vetted all Rank projects." The director claimed, "Balcon said they all liked it [the script], but they didn't think there was a possibility of its being successful. We were absolutely devastated." Leacock then received a phone call asking to see J. Arthur Rank in person. The director recalled:

I had a strange interview with this big man with a North Country accent who said he was about to do something he had never done before, and that was to go against the advice of his Board. He said he liked The Kidnappers and believed I would do a good job of it. Then he said he had one thing to ask me, and my heart sank; but he only asked me if I would bring in ‘the name of the Good Lord’ — I think that was the phrase he used.

Leacock added, "So it was made over Balcon's head and Balcon was very nice about it, I mean, he called up and said he was delighted that they had made an honest decision based on financial considerations and both he and Rank said, "Please do it as cheaply as possible," which we did."

The film's working title was Scotch Settlement. In August 1952 Earl St John, head of production at Rank, announced that the company would be making a series of films overseas, including Campbell's Kingdom and Scotch Settlement in Canada, Desperate Moment in Germany, and The Malta Story in Malta.

Leacock says Rank was willing to finance shooting in Canada and he spend several weeks scouting locations in Nova Scotia but "it was a period picture and there were very few buildings which we could have made use of over there" so it was decided to film in Scotland instead. The film was shot in Glen Affric outside Inverness, and at Pinewood Studios in London.

=== Casting ===
Leacock said he was "lucky" to cast Jean Anderson as the grandmother, although she was thirty years younger than her character. "The brass wanted a bigger name," he said. "In the event, there was some sort of a conflict just before we started shooting; Jean was available so I was able to have her."

The two lead actors were John Whiteley and Vincent Winter. Whiteley had already done a film, Hunted. Winter was from Aberdeen and discovered by casting agent Margaret Thompson. Leacock recalled, "We brought the children in to test for the parts; we did play situations, as we did with the film itself. Vincent couldn't read so he had to be firmly taught lines — he had a memory like a computer. He would do his own lines aloud and then silently mouth everyone else's words!"

Anderson recalled Winter "was enchantment, he won the hearts of everybody, he was so funny. You couldn't turn the camera on him, without getting something quite remarkable."

=== Shooting ===
Leacock said that during filming "Margaret Thomson worked with the children as much as I did."

During filming the stepson of Jim Sutherland died in a drowning accident.

== Release ==
The film was released in the US as The Little Kidnappers due to United Artists' fear that audiences would be turned off a film about kidnapping.

== Reception ==
=== Critical ===
Variety wrote "the main asset of this British production rests in two outstanding moppet performances by Vincent Winter and Jon Whiteley which lift the film from a conventional rut to make it enchanting... The two juvenile performers, one of whom is without previous stage or film experience, completely dominate the yarn. Rarely, if ever, have there. been such moppet portrayals without a trace of precociousness. They act like vets, speak their lines audibly and with understanding, and completely capture the spirit of the story. Their handling is a tribute to director Philip Leacock."

=== Box office ===
The film was the eighth most popular movie at the British box office in 1954.

According to Kinematograph Weekly the film was a "money maker" at the British box office in 1954.

Leacock said the film "made its money back in Canada alone."

=== Awards ===
Both Whiteley and Winter were presented with Honorary Juvenile Acting Oscars for their performances, which had been coached by director Margaret Thomson. In addition, the film was nominated for three BAFTA Film Awards and was entered into the 1954 Cannes Film Festival.

== Remake ==
A second film based on the same Patterson short story was released in 1990, under the original film's American title (The Little Kidnappers). Starring Charlton Heston in the role of Granddaddy, the film was written by Coralee Elliott Testar and shot entirely on location in Nova Scotia.
