= Svědomí =

1948 film

Svědomí is a Czech drama film. It was released in 1948.
