= The Spanish Gardener (film) =

- Directed by: Philip Leacock
- Written by: Lesley Storm
- Based on: The Spanish Gardener by A. J. Cronin
- Produced by: Earl St. John
- Starring: Dirk Bogarde; Jon Whiteley; Michael Hordern; Cyril Cusack
- Cinematography: Christopher Challis
- Edited by: Reginald Mills
- Music by: John Veale
- Distributed by: The Rank Organisation
- Release date: 25 December 1956
- Running time: 97 minutes
- Country: United Kingdom
- Language: English

The Spanish Gardener is a 1956 VistaVision and Technicolor film based on the 1950 eponymous novel by A. J. Cronin. The film, which stars Dirk Bogarde and Jon Whiteley, was directed by Philip Leacock.

The adaptation was filmed both at Pinewood Studios near London and in Palamós nearby Mas Juny estate, as well as in S'Agaro, on the Costa Brava, Catalonia. There were also two other adaptations of the story for Brazilian television: Nicholas (1958) and O Jardineiro Espanhol (1967). The film was entered into the 7th Berlin International Film Festival.

The ending of the film differs from that of the book.

Dirk Bogarde later called it "a travesty of what it should have been... a perfectly straightforward novel... ruined as a movie. Some of it’s quite good, I suppose, but I saw it and was heartbroken because it just wasn’t true."

== Plot ==
British diplomat Harrington Brande takes up a minor provincial consular post in Spain. The appointment is a disappointment to Harrington, who was hoping for a more senior position. His abandonment by his wife may have adversely affected his career, as might his brusque manner. He is accompanied by his eleven-year-old son, Nicholas, whom he teaches at home, contrary to his friend's advice that the boy would benefit from the social engagement with other boys at a boarding school. Harrington prefers to monopolise his company.

Nicholas sees it as an adventure, and soon becomes friends with the teenage gardener, José, spending time every day helping him with the plants and relaxing together. The exercise he is getting is much better for him than his father's mollycoddling of the perfectly healthy boy. However, the middle-aged Harrington is jealous of his son's enthusiasm for and friendship with the much younger man. He rebukes his son for taking him to watch Jose play pelota and refuses Jose's gift of fish that he had caught. Similarly, he refuses to let Nicholas join a youth group organized by a junior colleague. He later bans Nicholas and Jose from speaking on pain of Jose's dismissal. He also sets Jose to clear a large rockery as punishment.

While Harrington is away on a business trip, the drunken Garcia, the butler/ chauffeur, threatens Nicholas with a knife and tries to break into his bedroom and the terrified boy takes refuge overnight with Jose with whom he has again been spending time. His father discovers this and is furious. Garcia then frames José by convincing the father that Jose has stolen Nicholas' wristwatch, that Garcia himself had stolen, to cover up his own thieving behaviour.

Jose is arrested and is taken in handcuffs on a train with two armed soldiers guarding him. Brande is on the same train and suddenly realises his fault, but at the same time, Jose jumps from the train. It is initially unclear if he survived the jump.

Brande goes home and discovers his son has run away. He goes to Jose's family, but they have little sympathy, but the old father thinks he knows where they have gone.

On a stormy night Nicholas finds Jose in a derelict old mill, then Brande finds both and tells Jose that he knows he is innocent. Brande and Nicholas move on to another posting, and as they leave Brande apologises again to Jose, who does not see them to the station but instead says he must stay, as "there's much to do".

== Cast ==
- Dirk Bogarde as Jose
- Jon Whiteley as Nicholas Brande
- Michael Hordern as Harrington Brande
- Cyril Cusack as Garcia
- Maureen Swanson as Maria
- Lyndon Brook as Robert Burton
- Josephine Griffin as Carol Burton
- Bernard Lee as Leighton Bailey
- Rosalie Crutchley as Magdalena
- Ina De La Haye as Jose's Mother
- Geoffrey Keen as Dr. Harvey
- Harold Scott as Pedro
- Jack Stewart as a police escort
- Richard Molinas as a police escort
- Susan Lyall Grant as the maid
- John Adderley as the taxi driver
- David Lander as the policeman

== Production ==
The novel was published in 1950 and has its origins in the friendship between AJ Cronin's son Andrew and an Italian American gardener. The novel contains discussion of whether the boy has a gay attachment to the gardener - these were toned down for the film.

The film was one of a number of movies Rank was making overseas at the time to combat the threat of television. It was announced in February 1956.

According to director Philip Leacock, Dirk Bogarde originally turned down the film. "I was so upset because we had become good friends during Appointment in London," said the director. "I suggested we get together and talk it through, and eventually it worked out all right. John Bryan was a very good producer; he had been an art director and was one of the few who really dominated the visual look of a picture." Female lead Maureen Swanson was under contract to Rank at the time.

The movie was shot at Pinewood and on location just north of Barcelona in Spain. The house featured was the house of a millionaire. Michael Hordern recalled "Dirk was a great draw and a star, yet his part didn’t really weight the film, so it was thought to be a bit of a disappointment to his fans. I found Philip Leacock a very sympathetic director, particularly with children... I was proud of that film. It was certainly my best film part to that date."

== Reception ==
=== Critical ===
Variety called it "absorbing entertainment" where "Leacock has directed with a sincere, sensitive approach. He’s avoided the mistake of making this another psychological drama while giving the, necessary emphasis to the unhealthy father and child relationship."

Sight and Sound called it "very competently written and directed, and from the opening sequence its approach reveals an unusual sensitivity."

Filmink argued "The movie has some fame today because its clear gay subtext (where Michael Hordern – who has the role of his life – has a crush on Bogarde)."

=== Box office ===
The film was one of the most popular at the British box office in 1957. According to Kinematograph Weekly the film was "in the money" at the British box office in 1957.
