= The Spanish Gardener (novel) =

1950 novel by A. J. Cronin

- First edition (UK)
- Author: A. J. Cronin
- Language: English
- Publisher: Gollancz (UK); Little, Brown (US)
- Publication date: 1950
- Publication place: United Kingdom
- Media type: Print (hardback and paperback)
- Pages: 256 pp. (UK hardback edition)
- ISBN: 0-450-01108-9

The Spanish Gardener is a 1950 novel by A. J. Cronin that tells the story of an American consul, Harrington Brande, who is posted to San Jorge on the Costa Brava, Spain with his young son Nicholas. The novel relates how Nicholas's innocent love for his father is destroyed by the latter's jealousy and vindictiveness when Nicholas forms a friendship with the young Spanish gardener, José Santero.

The novel was adapted for both film and television.

== Synopsis ==
A restrained, precise man, Brande has an elevated sense of his own importance, believing his qualities have been overlooked in a series of postings around Europe which have failed to result in promotion. His other abiding resentment is the failure of his marriage to his wife Marion, who left him when his dispassionate and obsessively controlling nature overwhelmed her.

Brande's paranoid need to be admired and respected are focused on his hobby, a manuscript on Malebranche, a French philosopher, and on his 9-year-old son Nicholas. Nicholas is a delicate child who has been reduced to a state of invalidism by his father's overprotective and restrictive regime.

At San Jorge, the Brandes take a villa for which the couple Garcia and Magdalena have been engaged to act as butler/chauffeur and cook/housekeeper. Nicholas takes an instinctive dislike to Garcia, fearing his dead fish eyes and his tendency to appear unannounced, but Brande sees the man's obsequious servility as recognition of his own superior qualities. At Nicholas's suggestion, a gardener, the 19-year-old José, is hired to tend the neglected garden. José's amiable and ingenuous nature, despite his poverty and the responsibility of providing for his family members, soon attract Nicholas's curiosity and the pair start a friendship. Nicholas helps José in the garden, and his health improves.

Garcia, to ingratiate himself with Brande and plant suspicion on José, informs Brande of the friendship between Nicholas and José, and intensely jealous of Nicholas's affection, Brande forbids the boy to speak to the gardener again. He has no justifiable cause to dismiss José, so he sets out to punish him and break his spirit by ordering him to build a rockery from boulders, but without any helpers or special tools that José said were needed. Nicholas, however, realizes that he only promised not to speak to José, and this promise does not preclude writing and exchanging secret notes with each other.

Brande then receives a letter summoning him to Madrid and informing him that his predecessor at San Jorge, who was promoted to First Consul, has suffered a stroke. Elated and assuming that he will be appointed to the vacant post, Brande hurries to Madrid.

José takes advantage of Brande's absence to take Nicholas by train into the mountains on a fishing trip. Their enforced silence is broken, and the day is the idyllic highlight of Nicholas's life so far. However, Nicholas returns to find a drunken Garcia wielding a knife and abusing Magdalena. He spends a terrified night in his room, and when José learns of it the following day, rather than leave the defenceless boy alone for another night, takes him home with him.

A distraught Brande returns early from Madrid. He had merely been summoned to Madrid to temporarily fill the vacancy until a permanent appointment could be made, and upon telling his superior that he expected to be appointed permanently, he effectively is ridiculed and told he has no hope. He refused the temporary posting and writes to summon his friend, the psychiatrist Eugene Halevy, from Paris.

On returning to his villa, he finds Nicholas missing, and Garcia informs him that Nicholas has spent the night with José. He shows Brande a scrap of Nicholas's correspondence to José saying how much he loves to spend time with José. When Nicholas returns, Garcia and Magdalena deny his version of events, and he is confined to his room where Professor Halevy "examines" him, intent upon reading something perverse into his relationship with José.

Garcia then informs Brande that he is missing sums of money and suggests that Brande check his jewellery, all of which has gone. A pair of Brande's cufflinks is found in the lining of José's jacket, and he is arrested.

José is to be sent for trial in Barcelona, and Nicholas learns from José's grandfather Pedro that José will attempt to escape from the train and hide in the old mill where they went fishing. Nicholas sets off to meet him, and his father accompanies José and the police to act as witness in the trial. He has received a letter from the employment agency stating that Garcia is very likely to be the criminal Rodrigo Espantago whom the police are seeking; and though Brande has slowly come to believe in Garcia's guilt and thus José's innocence, has decided to do nothing about it until after José's trial. On the train, José makes his escape attempt, but Brande, anticipating his action, catches his sleeve, spoiling his jump so that José falls onto the track and is killed. Returning home, shaken, Brande learns that Garcia was indeed the criminal Rodrigo, had beaten Magdalena, who is not his wife, had stolen Brande's car, destroyed the completed manuscript on Malebranche that had been Brande's life's work, and fled. In a violent storm, Brande then has to find the missing Nicholas.

Seven months later, Brande is posted to Halversholm, a port town in Sweden, but his relationship with Nicholas is irretrievably broken. In the aftermath of the tragedy, Nicholas would not speak to his father other than to repeatedly tell him that he hated him. He asked for his mother's photo and her address and has been writing to her. In Stockholm, Nicholas, now recovered from a serious illness resulting from his misadventure in the storm, informs his father that he wishes to spend time with her in America—that it is "only fair ... to all of us."

== Review ==
Information on The Spanish Gardener from the fly leaf of Beyond This Place (published 1953 in Australia and NZ):

Dr Cronin has portrayed a man at the mercy of his own vanity. This man's son is the victim of his doting parent until the Spanish gardener shows the boy the way to a freer, healthier, happier life.

This is a haunting book with overtones of both beauty and tragedy. Among its characters – the frail, confined and sensitive little boy Nicholas; the father who was afraid to face himself; the criminal servant; the Consul's assistant upon whom at the moment of crisis he was reluctantly forced to rely; the fraudulent psychiatrist who would twist words spoken under mental torture; and above all the lovable character of the Spanish gardener himself – these are among Dr Cronin's most memorable characters.
