= Stephen Lawson =

Zimbabwean cricketer (born 1968)

Personal information
- Full name: Stephen Paul Lawson
- Born: 17 December 1968 (age 57); Umtali, Manicaland, Rhodesia
- Batting: Right-handed
- Bowling: Right-arm off break

Domestic team information
- Years: Team
- 1999/2000: Manicaland

Career statistics
Competition	FC
Matches	5
Runs scored	76
Batting average	10.85
100s/50s	0/0
Top score	24
Balls bowled	851
Wickets	10
Bowling average	48.30
5 wickets in innings	0
10 wickets in match	0
Best bowling	3/14
Catches/stumpings	2/–
- Source: ESPNcricinfo, 12 July 2021

Stephen Paul Lawson (born 17 December 1968) is a former Zimbabwean cricketer. Born in Umtali (now Mutare), he played five first-class matches for Manicaland during the 1999–2000 Logan Cup.
