= The Little Kidnappers (1990 film) =

- Genre: Crime; Drama
- Written by: Coralee Elliott Testar
- Directed by: Donald Shebib
- Starring: Charlton Heston; Patricia Gage; Bruce Greenwood; Leah Pinsent
- Music by: Mark Snow
- Country of origin: Canada
- Original language: English

Production
- Executive producers: Philip D. Fehrle; Glenn R. Jones; Noel Resnick
- Producer: James Margellos
- Cinematography: Miklós Lente
- Editor: Ron Wisman
- Running time: 92 minutes

Original release
- Network: Canadian Broadcasting Corporation; Disney Channel
- Release: August 17, 1990

The Little Kidnappers is a 1990 Canadian drama television film made by Testar Productions, Margellos-Resnick and Jones 21st Century for the Canadian Broadcasting Corporation and the Disney Channel. It tells the story of orphans Harry and Davy MacKenzie (Leo Wheatley and Charles Miller), who are sent to live with their stern grandfather, James MacKenzie (Charlton Heston).

Based on the short story "Scotch Settlement" by Neil Paterson (previously filmed in 1953), set in Nova Scotia in 1903, the film was shot in several locations throughout Nova Scotia with dockside scenes being filmed aboard the CSS Acadia at the Maritime Museum of the Atlantic in Halifax.

== Plot ==
Coralee Elliott Testar's version of the story revolves around letters written by James' son to his wife and children. Harry and Davy have brought them in a box James had carved for his son many years before. Through these letters, James begins to find healing from his grief over the death of his son at the hands of Dutch soldiers in the Second Boer War in South Africa, deliverance from the hatred in his heart for neighboring Dutch farmers, and acceptance of his daughter's love for the village doctor who is also of Dutch heritage.

The movie's title refers to the discovery and rescue by Harry and Davy of the neighbor's baby briefly left unattended on a beach and their decision to hide and care for it themselves rather than risk their grandfather's harsh and unmerciful reaction to it.

== Awards ==
The 1990 film received broad international distribution and has been nominated for numerous awards, winning the prestigious Banff World Media Rockie Award.
