= Karl Mediz =

Austrian painter

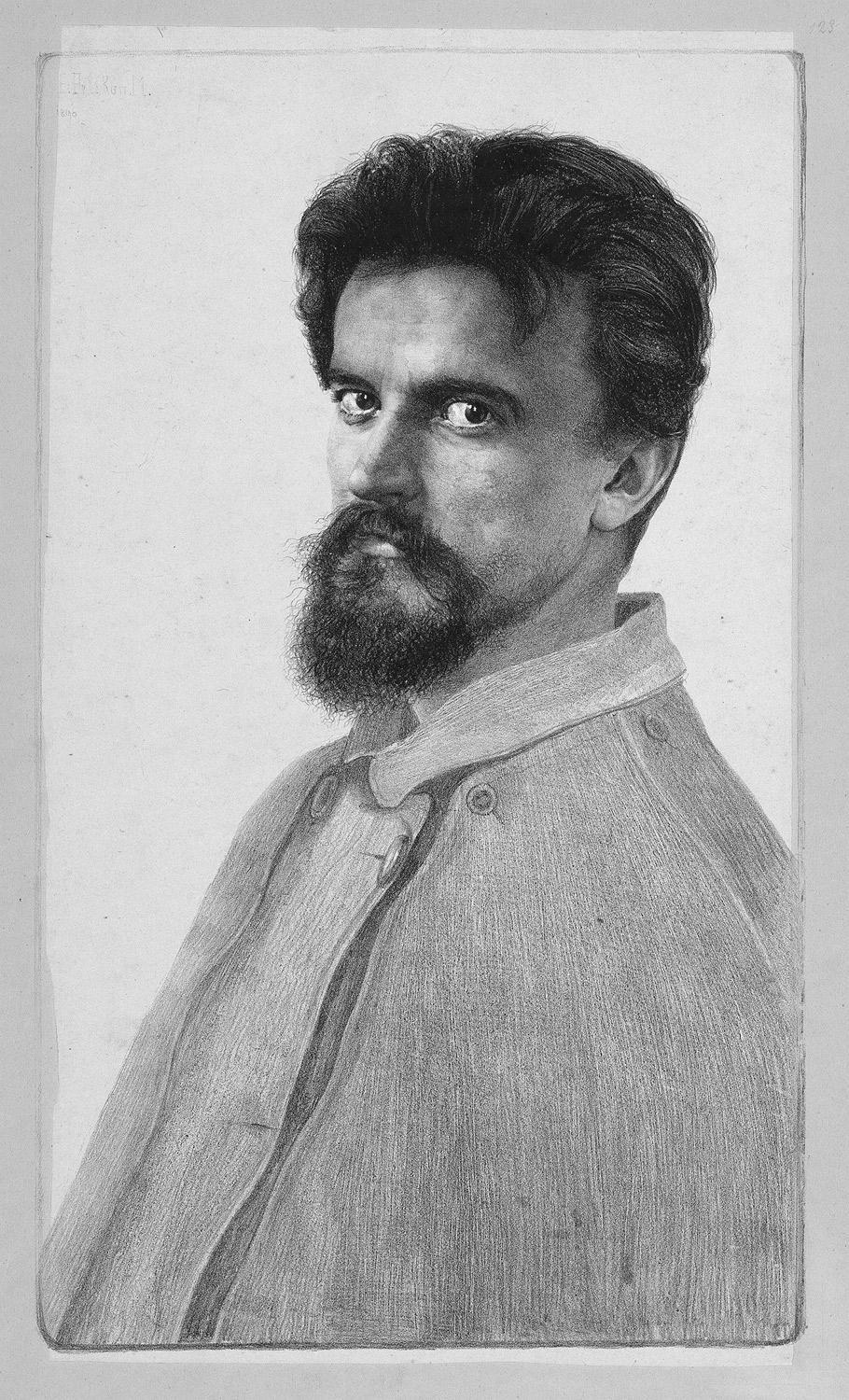
Karl Mediz by his wife, Emilie Mediz-Pelikan (1896)

Karl Mediz (4 June 1868, in Vienna – 11 January 1945, in Dresden) was an Austrian landscape and portrait painter. Many of his works are in the Symbolist style.

== Biography ==
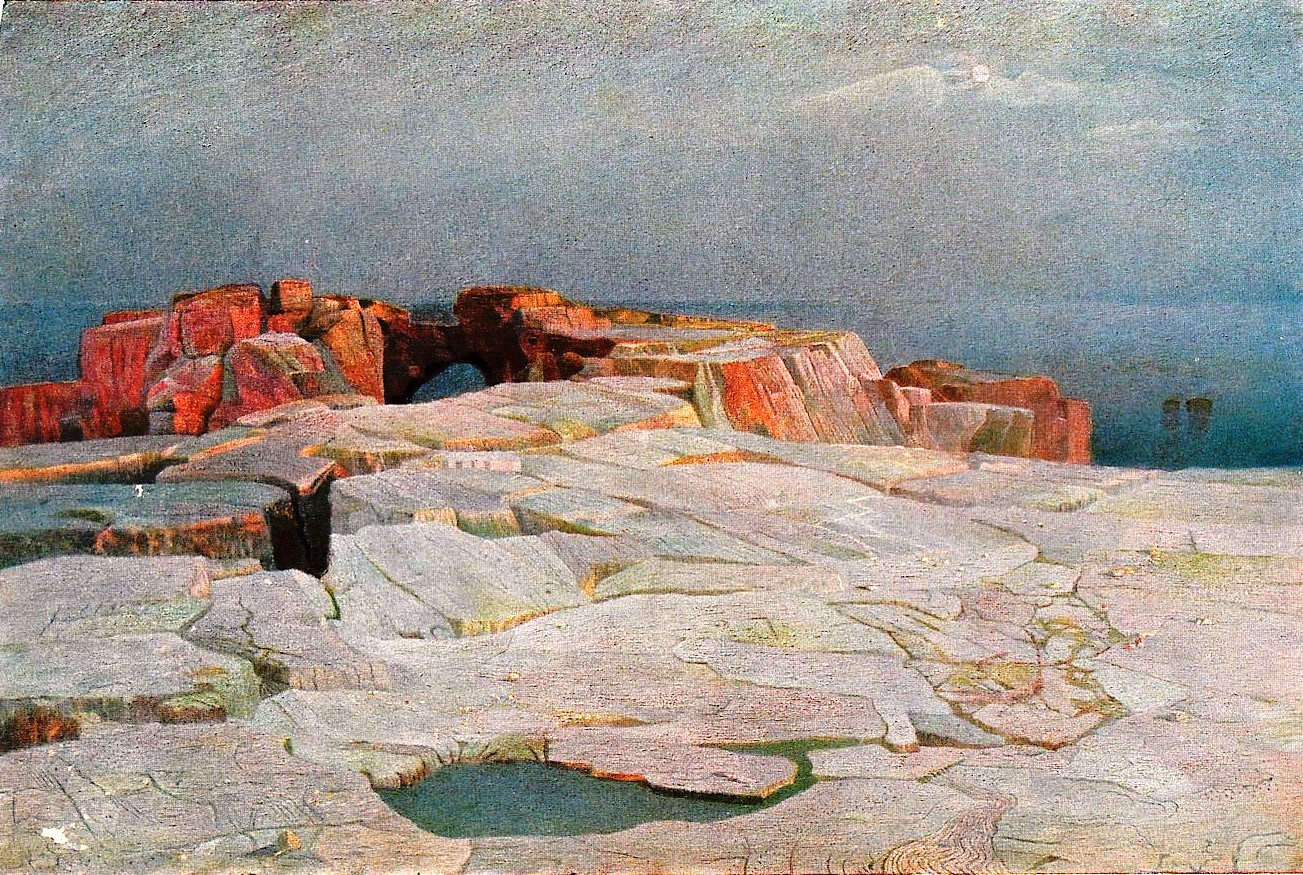
Coastal Landscape

He was born into a family of merchants and was raised by his aunt in Znaim. Later, he worked at his uncle's general store in Retz. After his artistic talents were discovered and favorably commented upon by Friedrich von Amerling, he was sent to study at the Academy of Fine Arts, Vienna, under Christian Griepenkerl and Fritz L’Allemand. This was followed by studies in Munich with Paul Hermann Wagner (1852–1937) and Alexander Demetrius Goltz. He finished at the Académie Julian in Paris.

In 1888, at the artists' colony in Dachau, he met the painter, Emilie Pelikan, whom he married in 1891. Despite his acquaintance with Theodor von Hörmann and recommendations from Fritz von Uhde, Franz von Lenbach and Ludwig Hevesi, he and Emilie could not make any progress and lived in poverty. First, they moved to Krems an der Donau and, with the financial assistance of friends, he was able to study in Italy. In 1894, they settled in Dresden.

From 1902 to 1912, he was a member of the Hagenbund, who sponsored a joint exhibition for Mediz and Emilie 1903. He also exhibited in Vienna in 1904 and Berlin in 1905 and 1906.

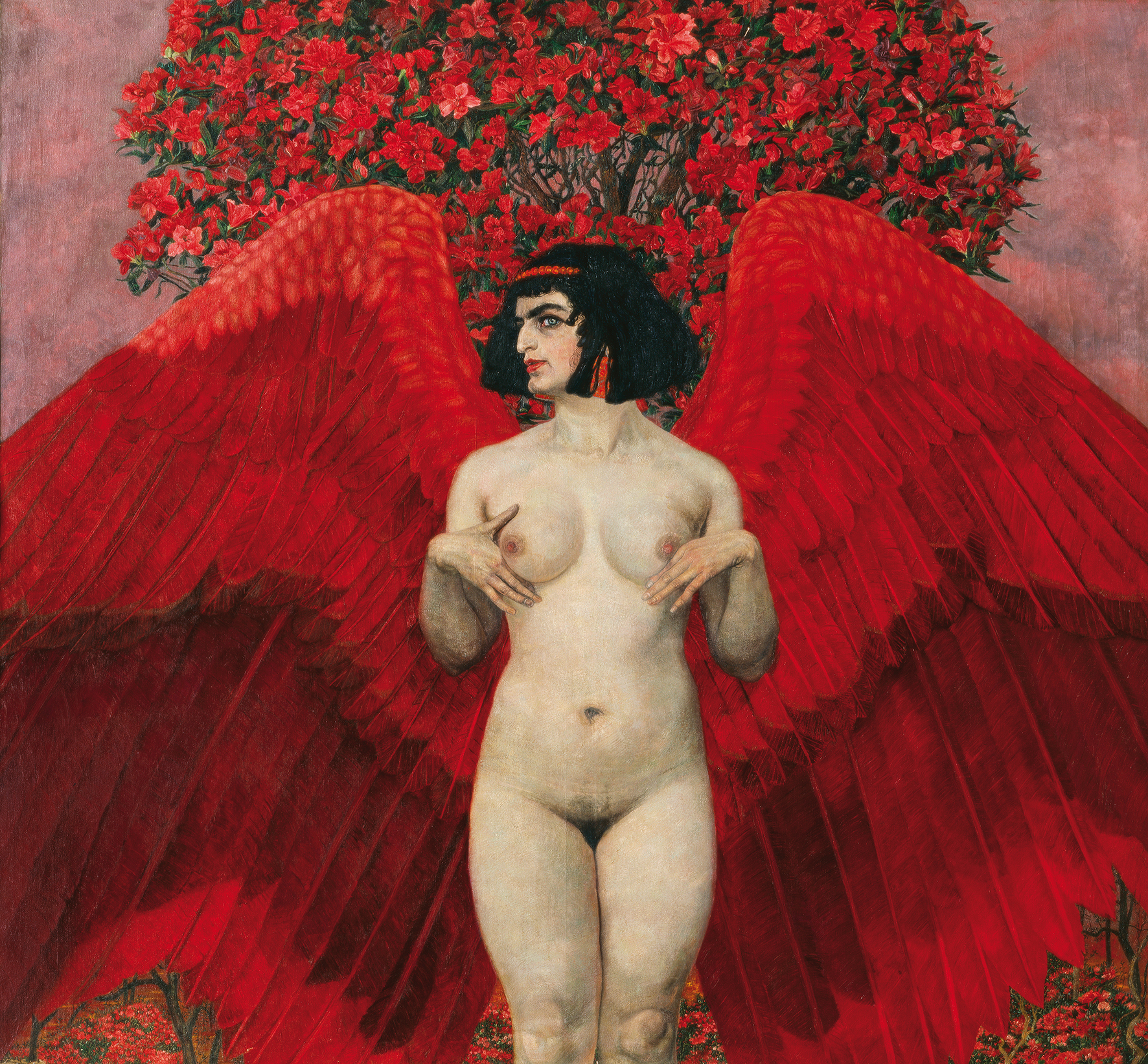
Red Angel (1902)

After Emilie's sudden death from heart failure in 1908, he was grief-stricken and never fully recovered. He held only one more showing, in Rome in 1911, then withdrew from public life and concentrated on drawing. He died just before the bombing of Dresden.

His estate soon passed into the hands of the new East German Communist régime and his works were forgotten until 1986, when an exhibition of his and Emilie's paintings was given at the Oberösterreichische Landesmuseen in Linz.
