= Emilie Mediz-Pelikan =

Austrian painter (1861–1908)

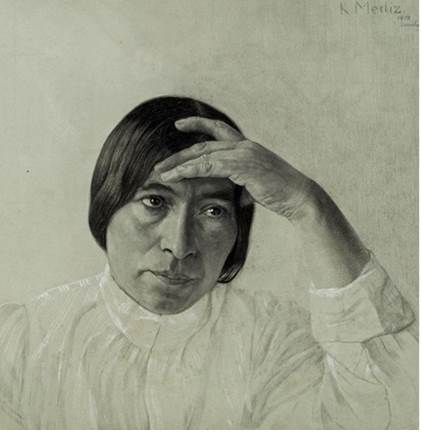
- Portrait of Emilie Mediz-Pelikan (The Meditative Emilie), by her husband, Karl Mediz, 1902, graphite on paper, heightened with white, The Jack Daulton Collection
- Born: Emilie Pelikan; 2 December 1861; Vöcklabruck, Austrian Empire
- Died: 19 March 1908 (aged 46); Dresden, German Empire
- Known for: Painting
- Spouse: Karl Mediz (m. 1891)

Emilie Mediz-Pelikan (2 December 1861 – 19 March 1908) was an Austrian landscape painter. Many of her works show some Symbolist influence.

== Biography ==
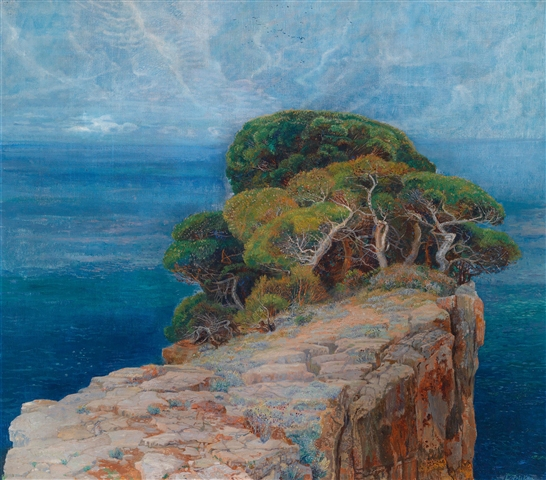
View from Lokrum

Emilie Pelikan was born in Vöcklabruck, Austrian Empire in 1861. Her father was a government financial officer. In 1883, she became the last private student of the landscape painter, Albert Zimmermann, who she had earlier assisted in Salzburg. Two years later, she accompanied him to Munich, where he died in 1888. She also lived at the artists' colony in Dachau, where she worked with Adolf Hölzel and Fritz von Uhde. Later, she spent time in Paris and the artists' colony in Knokke.

In Dachau, she had made the acquaintance of a Viennese painter named Karl Mediz and met him again at Knokke. In 1891, they went to Vienna and were married, but had little success there. At first, they moved to Krems an der Donau, where their daughter was born. In 1894, they decided to settle in Dresden.

They made numerous trips to Tyrolia, Italy and the Adriatic coast. In 1898, she finally had a major showing at the first exhibition of the Vienna Secession. In 1901, this was followed by a showing at the Internationale Kunstausstellung in Dresden. She and Karl had a joint exhibition in 1903, sponsored by the Hagenbund. She also had two major exhibitions at the Berlin Künstlerhaus.

In 1908, aged only forty-seven, she died suddenly of heart failure. The collaboration with her husband had been very intense; he and his work never fully recovered. Although much of her work was in the hands of the Staatliche Kunstsammlungen Dresden, he refused to allow any exhibitions. After his death, her paintings passed into the possession of the East German government and were forgotten. In 1986, a small exhibition was held at the Oberösterreichische Landesmuseen in Linz, but it is only since 2000 that her work has been rediscovered.

Her work was included in the 2019 exhibition City Of Women: Female artists in Vienna from 1900 to 1938 at the Österreichische Galerie Belvedere.

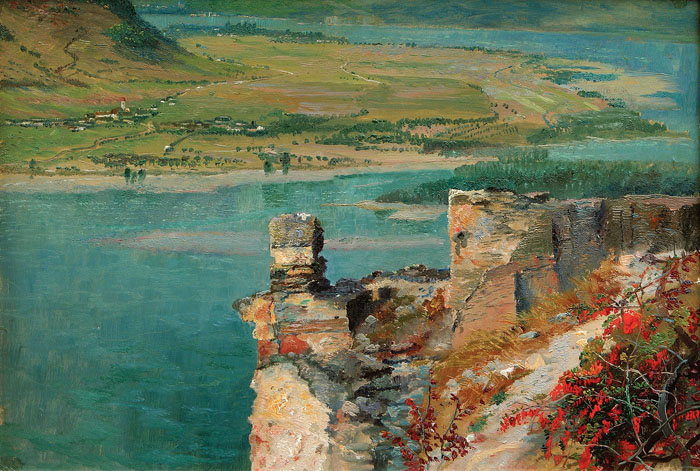
View from the Ruins of Dürnstein Castle
