= Schnackenberg =

Schnackenberg is a surname of German origin, being a variant of the surname Schnackenburg. Notable people with the surname include:

- Annie Schnackenberg (1835–1905), New Zealand missionary, temperance and welfare worker, and suffragist
- Elmer Jacob Schnackenberg (1889–1968), American judge
- Gjertrud Schnackenberg (born 1953), American poet
- Tom Schnackenberg (born 1945), New Zealand sailor and yacht designer
- Walter Schnackenberg (1880–1961), German painter and illustrator

== See also ==
- Schnackenburg, a town in Lower Saxony, Germany
- Schnackenburg (surname)
