= Hörmann (surname) =

Hörmann is a German surname. Notable people with the surname include:

- Judith Hörmann (born 1983), German sprint canoeist
- Ludwig Hörmann (1918–2001), German cyclist
- Raimund Hörmann (born 1957), German rower
- Silke Hörmann (born 1986), German sprint canoeist
- Theodor von Hörmann (1840–1895), Austrian landscape painter
- Walter Hörmann (born 1961), Austrian footballer and manager
- Xaver Hörmann (1910–1943), German sprint canoeist
