= Fritz Schwarz-Waldegg =

Austrian Expressionist and Cubist painter of Jewish ancestry

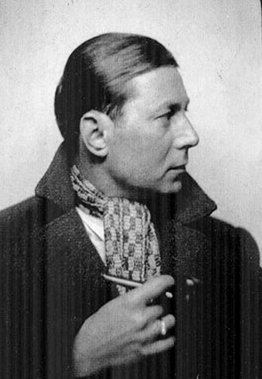
Fritz Schwarz-Waldegg (1930s)

Fritz Schwarz-Waldegg, originally Friedrich Schwarz (1 March 1889, Vienna - 14 October 1943, Sobibor) was an Austrian Expressionist and Cubist painter of Jewish ancestry. He was murdered in the Holocaust.

== Biography ==
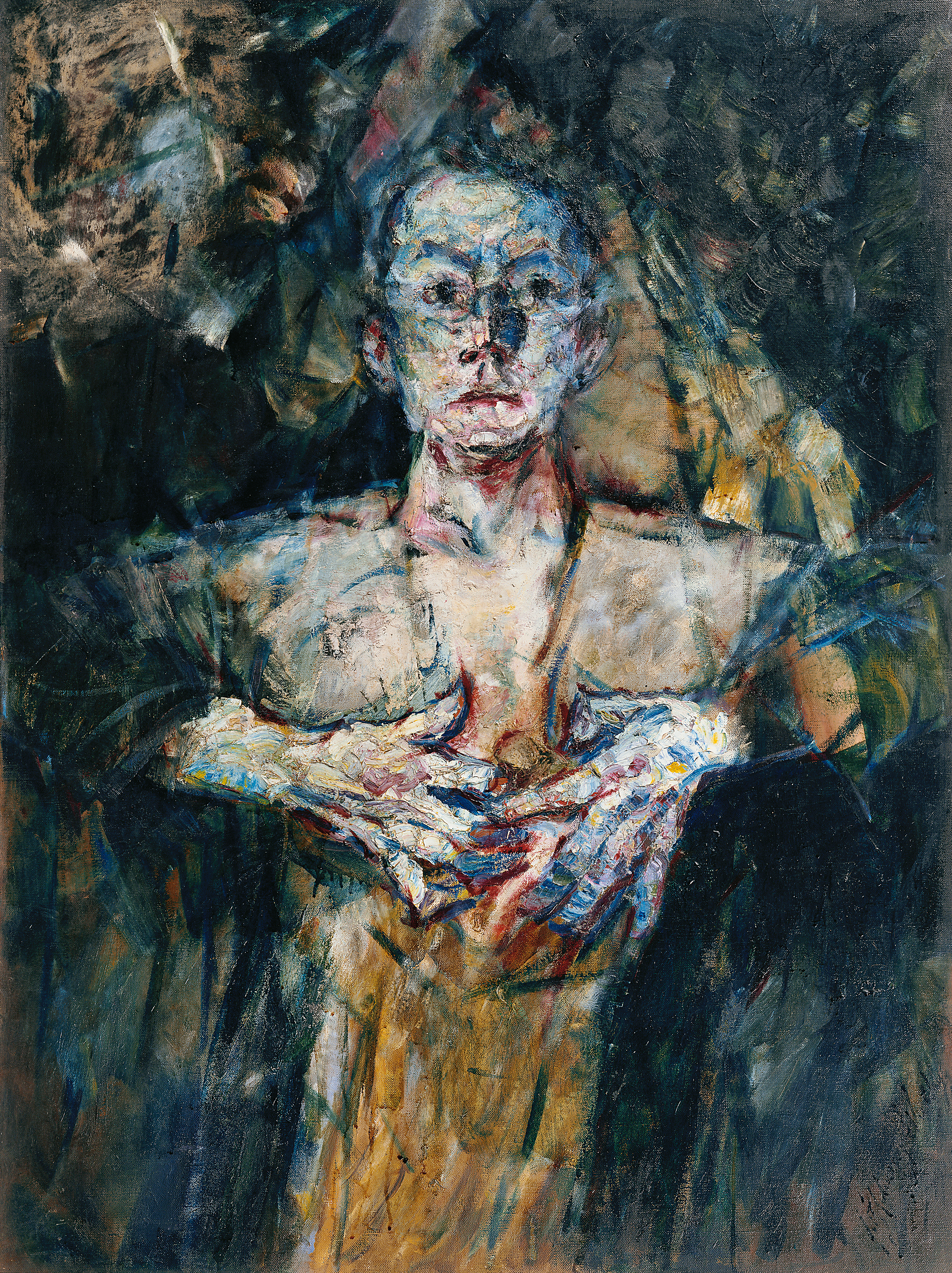
Avowal

His father was a magistrate's clerk. He showed an early interest in art and his parents were supportive. At the age of seventeen, he began attending the private art school of David Kohn (1861-1922), a portrait and genre painter. He received further training at the Academy of Fine Arts under Christian Griepenkerl and Rudolf Bacher.

At the outbreak of World War I, he volunteered and served with the infantry in Italy, where he painted battle scenes. During his service, in 1916, he converted to Catholicism, with the approval of his family. After completing his tour of duty, he traveled extensively; staying briefly in Copenhagen, Rome and Paris.

When he returned to Vienna, he made the acquaintance of Egon Schiele and Oskar Kokoschka. As a result, he joined the Hagenbund, a liberal artists' association. From 1925 to 1927, he served as its President. Later, he traveled to Spain and Bosnia with his companion, the art dealer Leah Járay-Bondi (1880-1968).

After the Anschluss, despite his conversion and good military record, he was forbidden to exhibit or accept commissions. Seven months later, he was suddenly forced to vacate his studio and many of his works were lost. He lived with his sister Melanie until August 1942, when he was taken away by the Gestapo. He was transported to the extermination camp at Maly Trostenets, but presumably transported further to Sobibor, as he is mentioned in the testimony of Kurt Ticho (Thomas) as an inmate he was befriended with., although earlier sources believe he was transported to Maly Trostinez and murdered upon arrival on 4 September 1942.

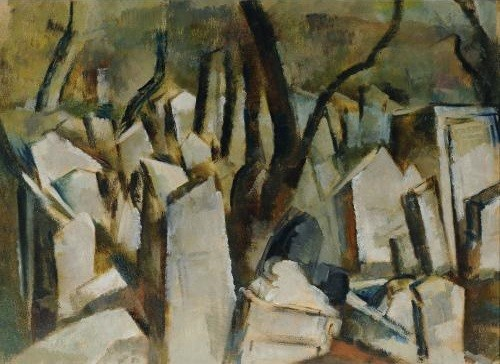
Old Jewish Cemetery, Prague

His surviving works remained in the care of his sister, who escaped death by virtue of being married to an "Aryan". They have since been widely scattered. In 2009, the Jüdisches Museum Wien gathered together 25 oil paintings and 70 watercolor drawings for a major retrospective.
