= Ernst Stöhr =

Austrian painter, graphic artist and writer

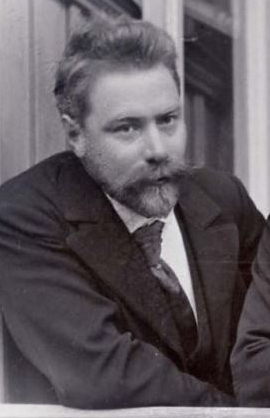
Ernst Stöhr (1890s)

Ernst Stöhr (1 November 1860, Sankt Pölten – 17 June 1917, Sankt Pölten) was an Austrian painter, graphic artist, writer and amateur musician; one of the founding members of the Vienna Secession.

== Biography ==
His father, Karl (1825–1909), was a violin maker and his uncle, Ludwig Stöhr (1836–1902), who lived with his family, was a music teacher, composer and Director of the Sankt Pölten Musikvereins. As a child, he showed an aptitude for painting, poetry and music and was uncertain which one to pursue.

He eventually chose painting and began his studies in 1877, at the University of Applied Arts Vienna. His multiple talents made him a popular guest in local society. He was displeased with the stiffly formal training at the University, however, and in 1879, switched to the Academy of Fine Arts, where he studied with Carl Rudolf Huber and August Eisenmenger.

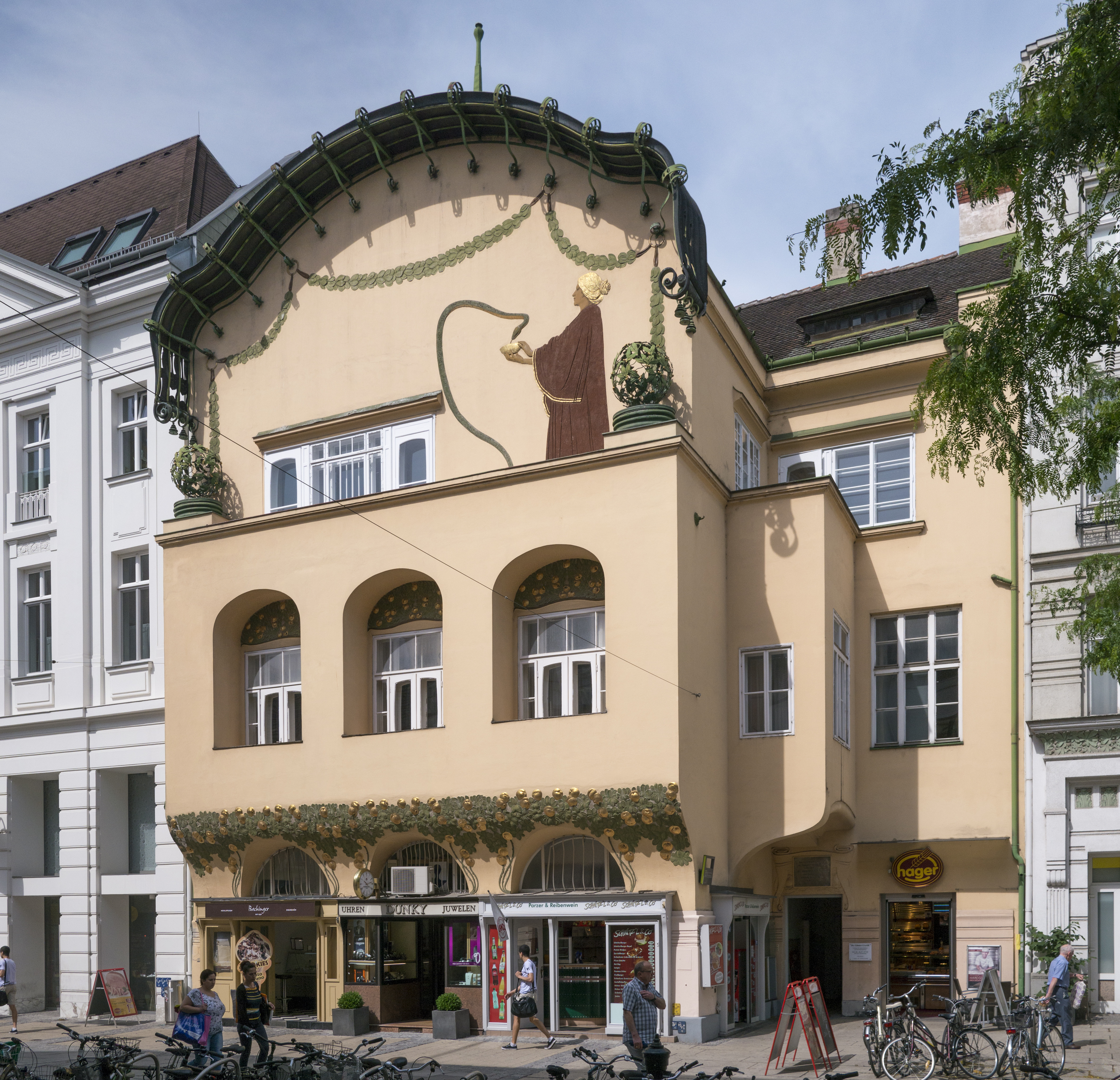
The Stöhr-Haus in Sankt Pölten

Once again, he found himself at odds with his teachers, who were too wedded to the Romantic style. He persevered until 1887, when he began travelling between Sankt Pölten, Melk and Bohinj, where his cousin, Friederike, ran a hotel. Eventually, financial problems forced him to return to Vienna.

In 1895, he organized a successful exhibition of works by the recently deceased Theodor von Hörmann, an early critic of the Academy. The following year, he became a member of the Künstlerhaus Wien. There, he joined the circle of young artists known as "Die Jungen", centered around Gustav Klimt. In 1897, he and seventeen other artists left the Künstlerhaus to form the Vienna Secession. Over the years, he was a regular contributor to Ver Sacrum, the group's official publication.

=== Later career and the loss of his family ===
In 1898, he married Friederike and opened a studio in Bohinj (Slo). That same year, he designed the façade for a house his brother Hermann (a doctor) was building in Sankt Pölten; now preserved as the Stöhr-Haus. Later, he bought his own printing press to experiment with printing techniques. The 12th issue of Ver Sacrum was entirely his work. In 1902, he wrote the preface for the catalog accompanying the Secession's "Beethovenausstellung (1902)". During this time, he was invited to become a guest member of the Hagenbund.

Shortly after that exhibition, his beloved uncle, Ludwig, died and he went through a period of severe depression. In 1904, his mother became seriously ill and he returned to Sankt Pölten to help care for her. After she died, his father suffered through a long illness and died in 1909. Both events were followed by worsening episodes of depression, prompting him to seek relief in religion and philosophy.

In 1915, Italy entered World War I, which placed Bohinj / Wochein within the war zone. His paintings, always rather melancholy, began to reflect his increasing despair; dealing largely with hopeless situations and death. In early 1917, he was taken to a hospital in Tulln an der Donau, but was released in a few weeks. Upon his release, he returned to Sankt Pölten, went to the family home, and hanged himself in the kitchen.

== Selected works ==
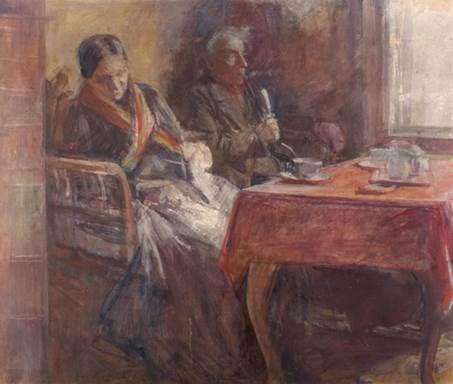
An Elderly Couple at Home

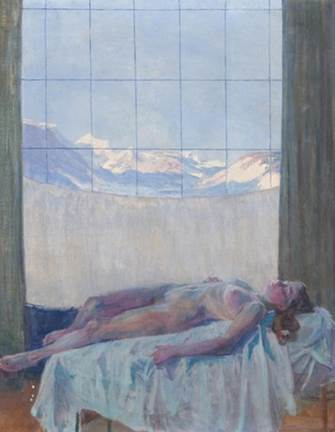
Reclining Nude
by a Window

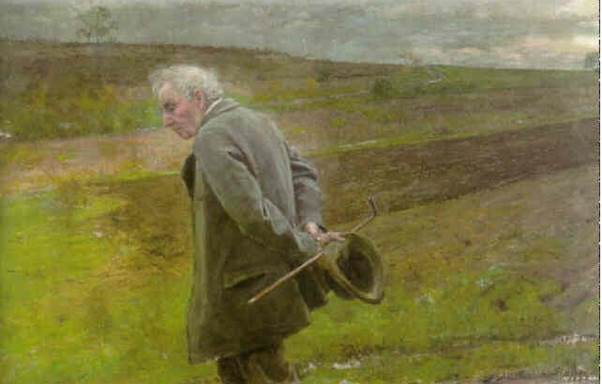
The Stroller

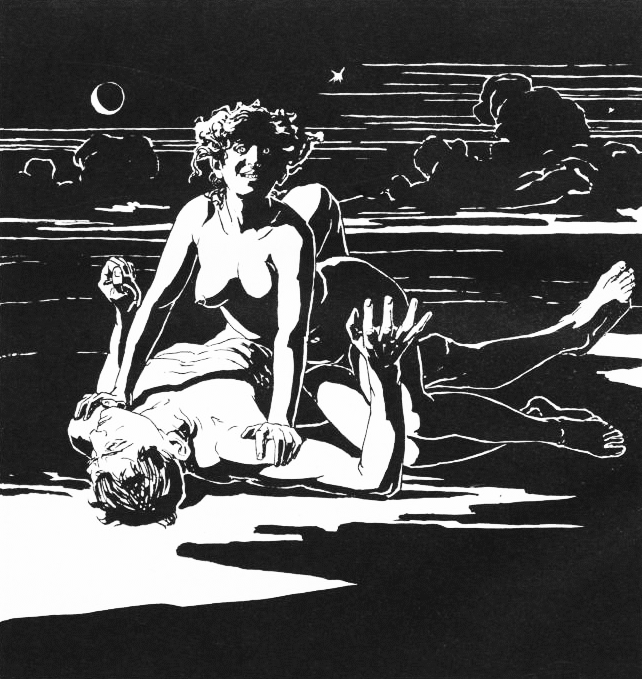
Vampire, from
Ver Sacrum
