= Eugen Sturm-Skrla =

Austrian painter (1894–1943)

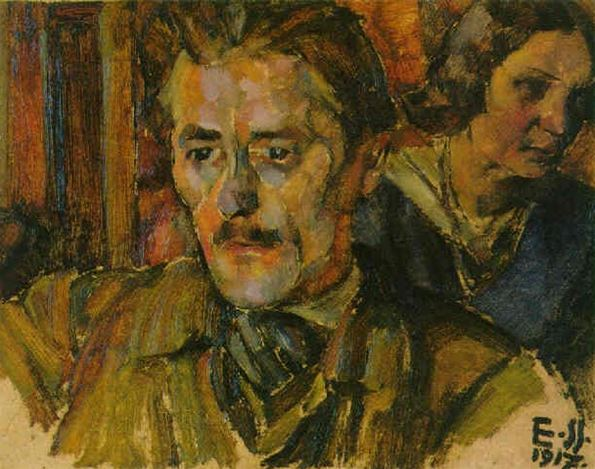
Self-portrait with Woman (1917)

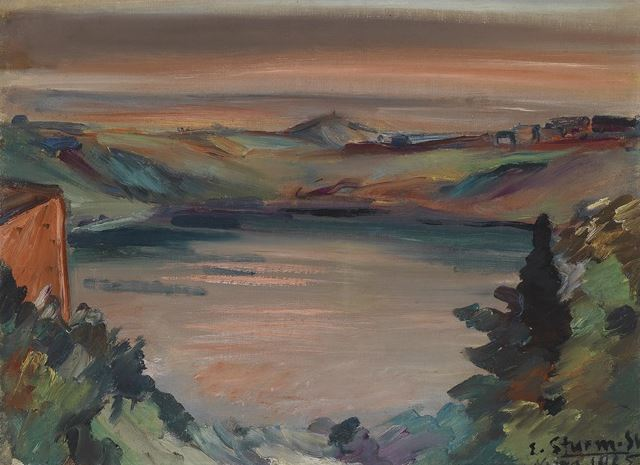
Landscape with Lake

Egge or Eugen Sturm-Skrla (9 April 1894 – 25 January 1943) was a Hungarian-born Austrian painter.

== Biography ==
Sturm-Skrla was born in Komárom. His father was a military bandmaster. From 1907 to 1909, he studied privately with Carl Haunold, who was a landscape painter and librettist. He completed his studies at the Academy of Fine Arts, Vienna from 1911 to 1914. His primary instructors there were Rudolf Bacher, who was also a sculptor, and Rudolf Jettmar. Later, he toured Italy and learned the techniques of fresco painting.

After returning from military service in 1919, he became a member of the Hagenbund. Two years later, he joined the Vienna Künstlerhaus and, together with Viktor Tischler (1890–1951), helped create the "Neuen Vereinigung" (New Association), an offshoot of the Hagenbund.

After that time, he concentrated on frescoes. His best known project in that medium was executed in 1926 at the Kleines Festspielhaus in Salzburg; in conjunction with Anton Faistauer. He also designed tapestries. From 1929 to 1935, he operated a fresco painting school in Ronco sopra Ascona, Switzerland; near the Italian border in Ticino. He returned to Vienna when the Swiss government failed to express interest in his work.

He made his living largely from portraits, but still suffered financial difficulties and became seriously ill in his final years.

His works may be seen at the Belvedere and several other galleries in Vienna.
