= Paula Deppe =

German painter

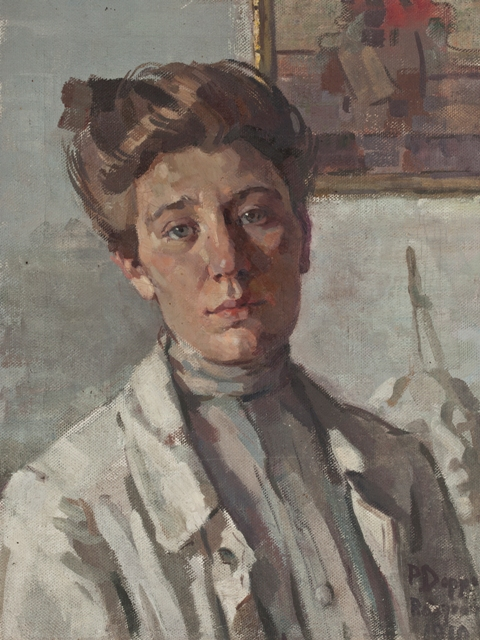
Self-portrait (1910)

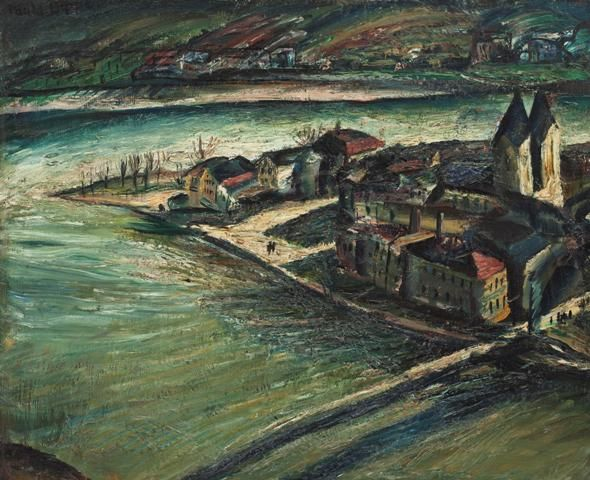
The Ortspitze in Passau

Paula Deppe (12 October 1886 – 4 October 1922) was a Bohemian German painter, engraver and illustrator. She was known for landscapes, portraits and still-lifes.

== Biography ==
Deppe was born on 12 October 1886 in Rokycany. Her father was the manager of a leather factory. She began her artistic education at the Akademischer Malerschule in Plzeň, an art school exclusively for women, under the direction of the Czech painter, Jindřich Duchoslav Krajíček.

In 1907, she transferred to the "Ladies' Academy" of the Münchner Künstlerinnenverein (A women's art association), although the classes were actually held at the Academy of Fine Arts. There, she studied with Heinrich Knirr and Ferdinand Götz (1874–1941). She also supplemented her formal lessons with classes at a private academy operated by Julius Seyler.

Her major showings include one in 1914, at the "International Exhibition of Book and Graphic Arts" (BUGRA) in Leipzig, and exhibitions of the Münchener Neue Secession in 1919 (at the Glaspalast) and 1921. The latter came about after her intimate friend, the landscape painter Gerta Springer, introduced her to Maria Caspar-Filser and her husband, Karl Caspar, two of the Secession's founders.

For most of her life, she lived with her parents or siblings. After World War I, when her father's leather factory was given to the new government of Czechoslovakia, the family moved to Seestetten, near Passau, where he opened a sawmill. Shortly after, Paula moved into a house with her sister Frieda in nearby Laufenbach.

She died on 4 October 1922 of blood poisoning at a clinic in Passau, following an operation to treat abdominal tuberculosis.

== Sources ==
- Max Brunner, Petra Gruber, Sandra Gabert (eds.): Paula Deppe – Lebensskizzen einer Künstlerin. (exhibition catalog) OberhausMuseum Passau, 2011 ISBN 978-3-86328-106-9
- Herbert Schindler: Paula Deppe – Wege und Umwege zu einer Künstlerin. Einhell, 1982
- Paula Deppe 1886–1922 – Graphik und Arbeiten auf Papier. Landstritch, 1992 ISBN 978-3-88849-993-7
- Aus den Tagebüchern der Paula Deppe. (personal diaries), Neuauflage, Hamburg-Harburg, 1942
