= Johanna Kampmann-Freund =

Austrian artist

- Born: Johanna Freund; 25 March 1888; Vienna, Austria
- Died: 1 July 1940 (aged 52); Vienna, Austria
- Known for: Painting
- Spouse: K. Kampmann (m. 1916; died in 1923)

Johanna Kampmann-Freund (1888-1940) was an Austrian painter and in 1927 was the first woman to win the Austrian State Prize.

== Biography ==
Kampmann-Freund née Freund was born on 25 March 1888 in Vienna, Austria. She studied at the Vienna Women's Academy. She was married to K. Kampmann from 1916 until his death in 1923.

In 1927 Kampmann-Freund was the first woman to win the Austrian State Prize, which was for her painting Hagar. She was a member of the Austrian Association of Women Artists (VBKÖ) and the Hagenbund.

Kampmann-Freund died on 1 July 1940 in Vienna. Her work is included in the collection of the Metropolitan Museum of Art.

== Legacy ==
Her work was included in the 2019 exhibition City Of Women: Female artists in Vienna from 1900 to 1938 at the Österreichische Galerie Belvedere.

== Gallery ==
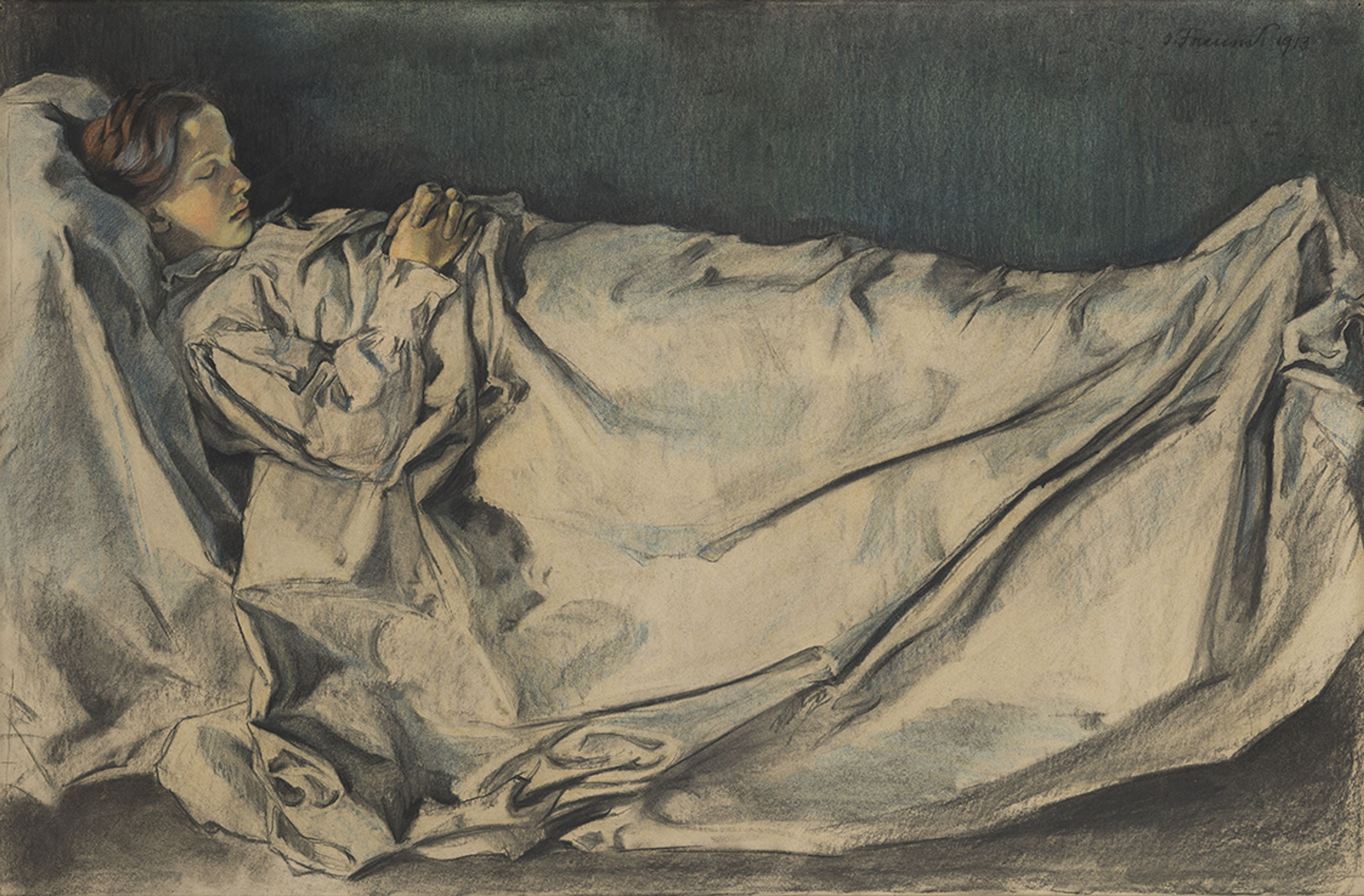
Das tote Kind (The dead child), 1913

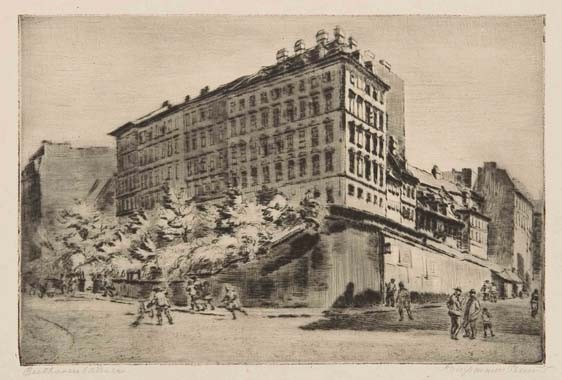
Beethovenhäuser
