= Hugo Baar =

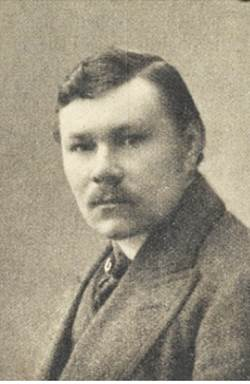
- Hugo Baar, c. 1900–1905
- Born: 3 March 1873; Nový Jičín, Moravia, Austria-Hungary
- Died: 18 June 1912 (aged 39); Munich, German Empire
- Education: Academy of Fine Arts Vienna
- Known for: Painting

Hugo Baar (3 March 1873 – 18 June 1912) was a Moravian German landscape painter.

== Biography ==
Baar was born on 3 March 1873 in Nový Jičín, Moravia, Austria-Hungary. His father was a merchant. After attending a German gymnasium, he learned weaving at a local arts and crafts school from 1889 to 1892. Later, he was able to enroll at the Academy of Fine Arts, Vienna, where he studied with the landscape painter, Rudolf Ribarz, and the Academy of Fine Arts, Munich, where his primary instructors were Gabriel von Hackl and Heinrich Knirr.

In 1903, he married the daughter of a hat factory manager and had his first showing in Vienna, where he participated in an exhibition staged by the Hagenbund and became a member of that group. The following year, he had a solo exhibition in Olomouc, near his birthplace. After resettling there, he made the acquaintance of Bohumír Jaroněk, a member of the "Association of Moravian Artists" (SVUM) who enabled him to exhibit with that organization. In 1907, he was one of the founding members of the local Museum Association.

He also exhibited in Brno with the "Mährischer Kunstverein", the German equivalent of the SVUM. At this time, he came under the influence of Gustav Klimt and was associated with the Vienna Secession. Later he helped establish the "Association of German-Moravian Visual Artists" in Brno and became its Vice-Chairman. The Chairman was Hugo Charlemont, but Baar organized all of the group's activities.

In 1910, he travelled extensively throughout Germany, Belgium and the Netherlands. He died suddenly on 18 June 1912 in Munich, while working on a contract for lithographs.

== Selected paintings ==
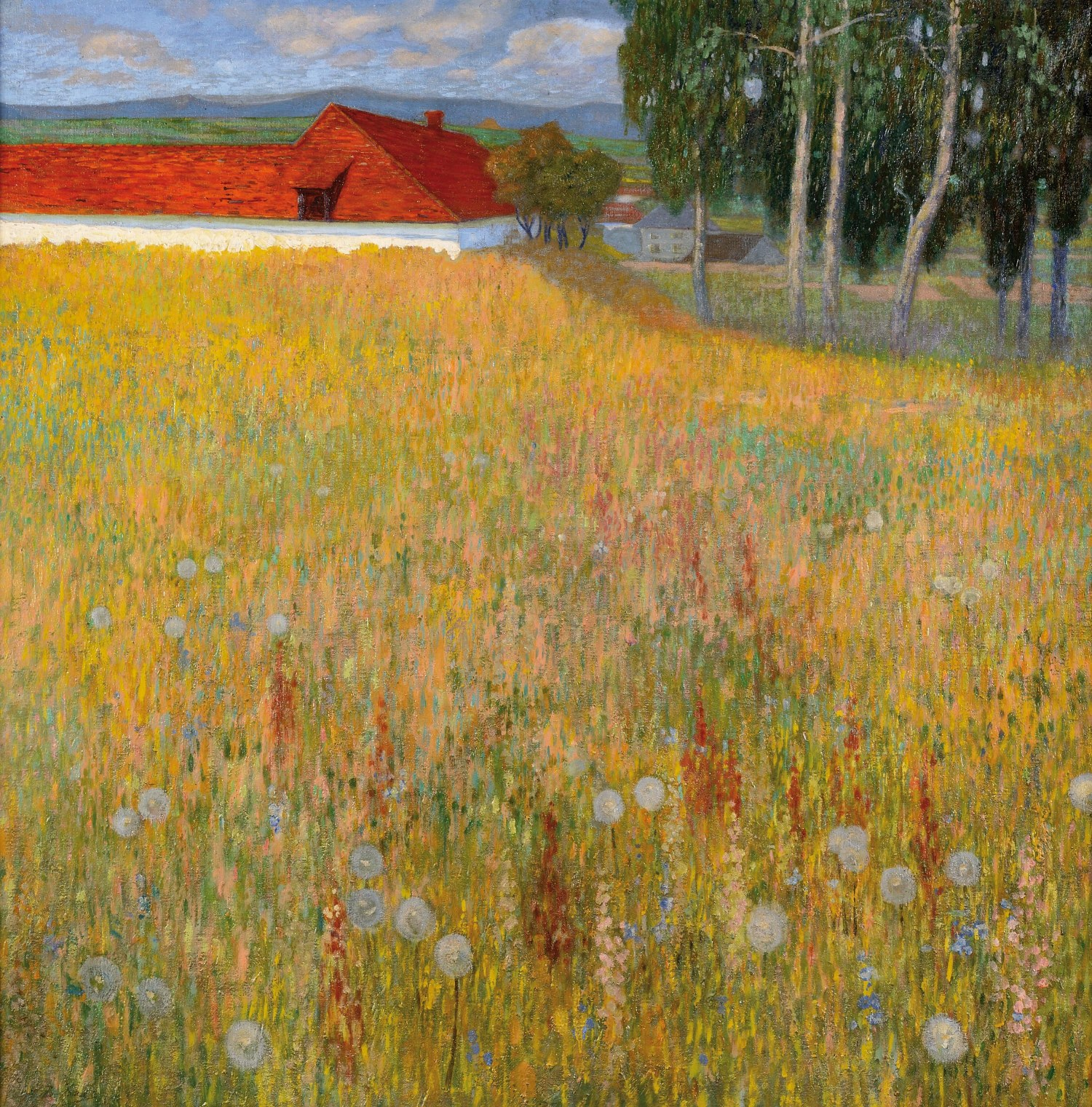
Meadow Landscape
with Farm

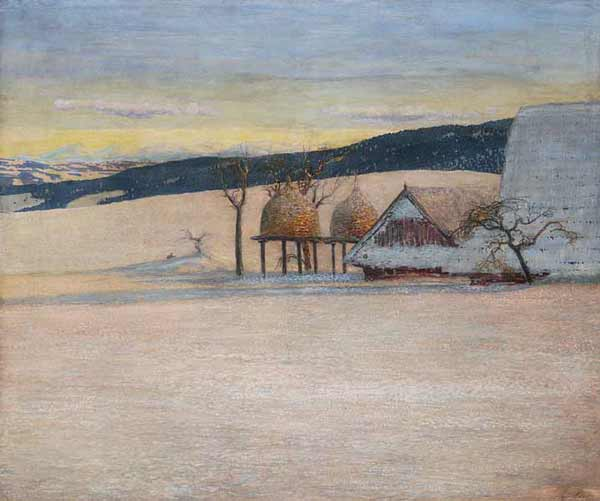
Winter Landscape

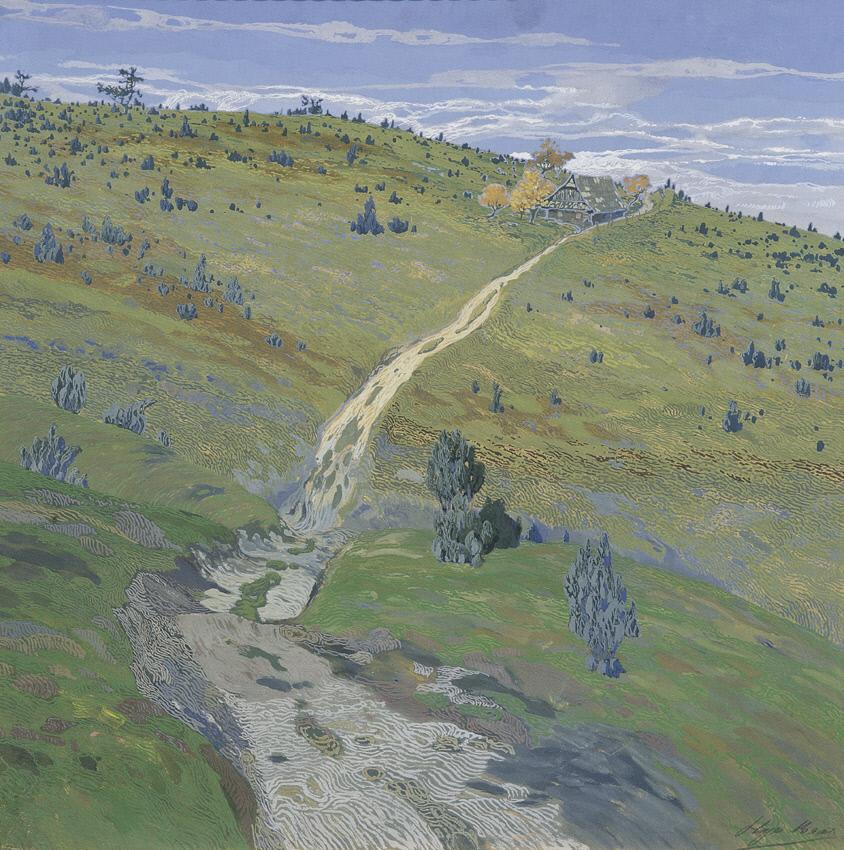
Mountain Path in the Beskids

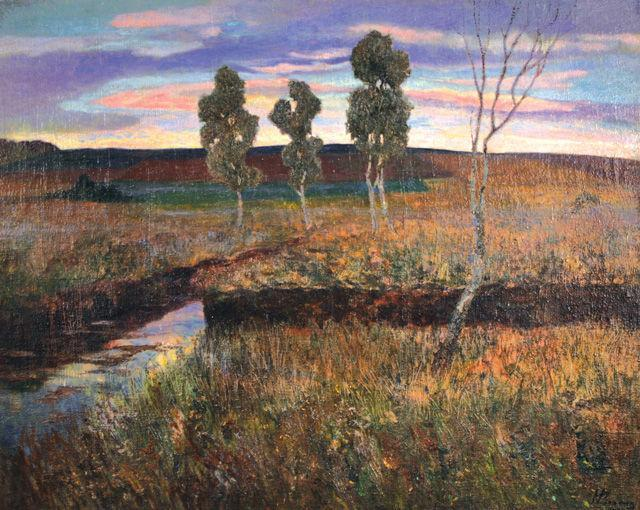
Evening Mood
