= Lilly Steiner =

Austrian artist

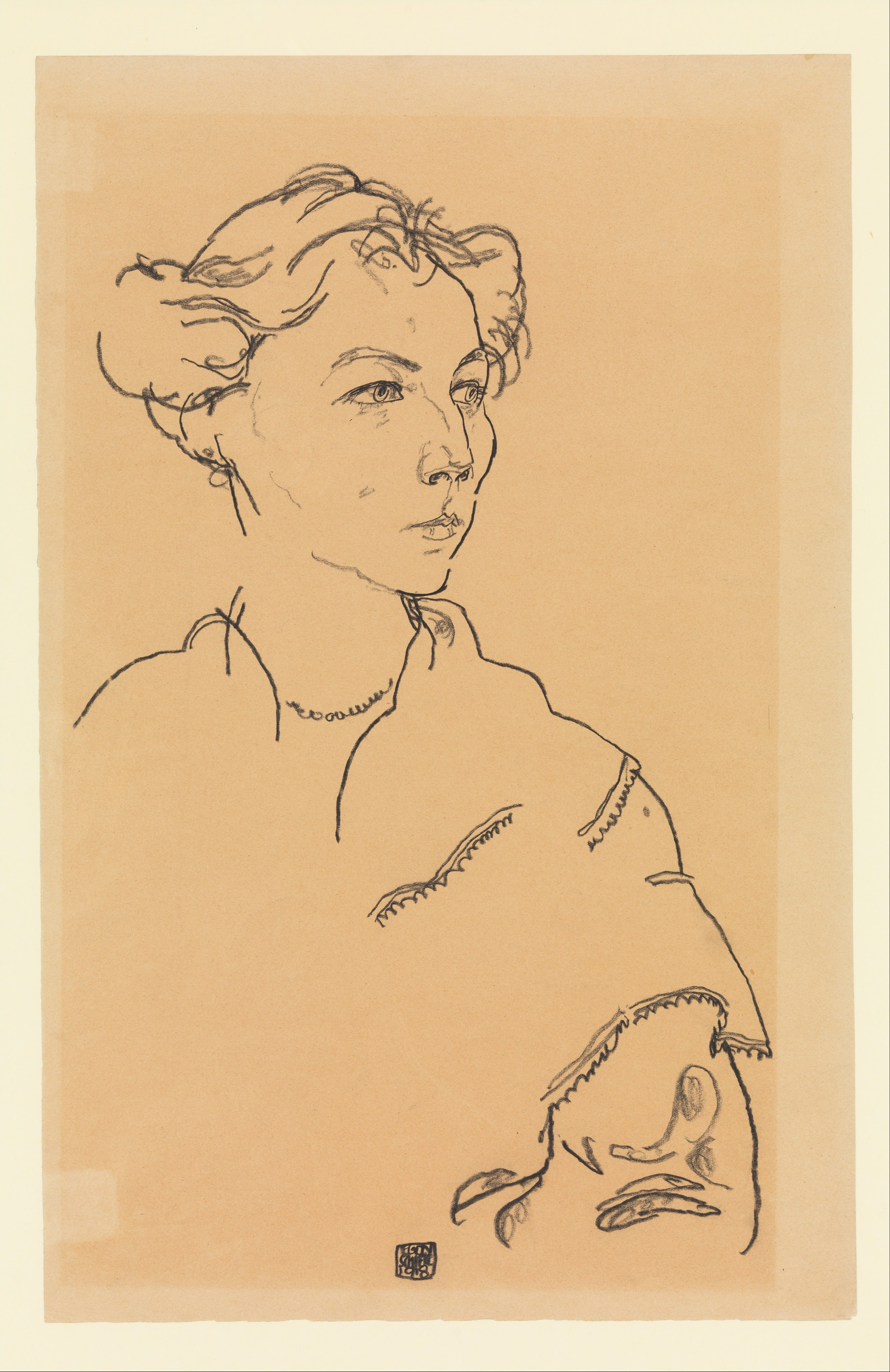
- drawing of Steiner by Egon Schiele, 1918
- Born: Lilly Hofmann; 7 April 1884; Vienna, Austria
- Died: 3 October 1961 (aged 77); Paris, France
- Known for: Painting
- Spouse: Hugo Steiner (m. 1904)
- Website: lillysteiner.com

Lilly Steiner (1884–1961) was an Austrian painter and graphic artist.

== Biography ==
Steiner née Hofmann was born on 7 April 1884 in Vienna, Austria. She attended the Art School for Women and Girls in Vienna. In 1904 she married Hugo Steiner. She was founding member of the Print Club of Viennese artists and a member of the Hagenbund. In 1927 Hugo and Lilly moved to Paris. Her work was part of the painting event in the art competition at the 1928 Summer Olympics.

Steiner died in Paris on 3 October 1961. Her work was included in the 2019 exhibition City Of Women: Female artists in Vienna from 1900 to 1938 at the Österreichische Galerie Belvedere.
