= Karl O'Lynch von Town =

Austrian painter

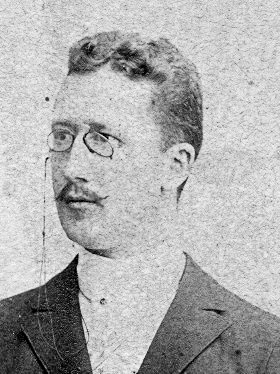
Karl O'Lynch von Town (before 1900)

Karl O'Lynch von Town, or Carl O'Lynch of Town (22 June 1869 in Ljubljana – 31 January 1942 in Genoa) was an Austrian Post-Impressionist painter of Irish ancestry.

== Biography ==
His family was one of the "Tribes of Galway" and were among the original sponsors of St. Nicholas' Collegiate Church. In the 1690s his ancestor, James O'Lynch, emigrated to the Austro-Hungarian Empire, following the defeat of the Jacobites. After serving under Leopold I in the Great Turkish War, James acquired the "von" through an adelsbrief (letter of ennoblement). Karl's father was a mathematician, specializing in geometry.

From 1888 to 1890, he attended the drawing school in Graz, then studied at the Academy of Fine Arts, Vienna, with Siegmund L'Allemand. Later, he continued his studies at the Academy of Fine Arts, Munich, with Gabriel von Hackl and Nikolaus Gysis. In 1904, he had his first major showing at the fifth annual exhibition of the Artists' Association of Styria.

Although he exhibited frequently in Graz and Vienna, he established his studio in Munich, where he became involved in the circle of artists associated with Emil Jakob Schindler. He was a member of the Hagenbund from 1904 to 1906.

A frequent traveler, he visited Italy, the Netherlands, Belgium and England. Among his favorite subjects were coastal landscapes around the North Sea. However, after staying at the art colony in Dachau, he became fascinated with the mountains and spent much of his remaining career painting in Upper Bavaria, the Austrian Alps and the Dolomites.

His painting of Vernazza was bought by Adolf Hitler at the Große Deutsche Kunstausstellung of 1938 for 1,500 Reichsmarks. He died during a visit to Italy and is interred in Graz. A major retrospective was held there in 1949.

== Selected paintings ==
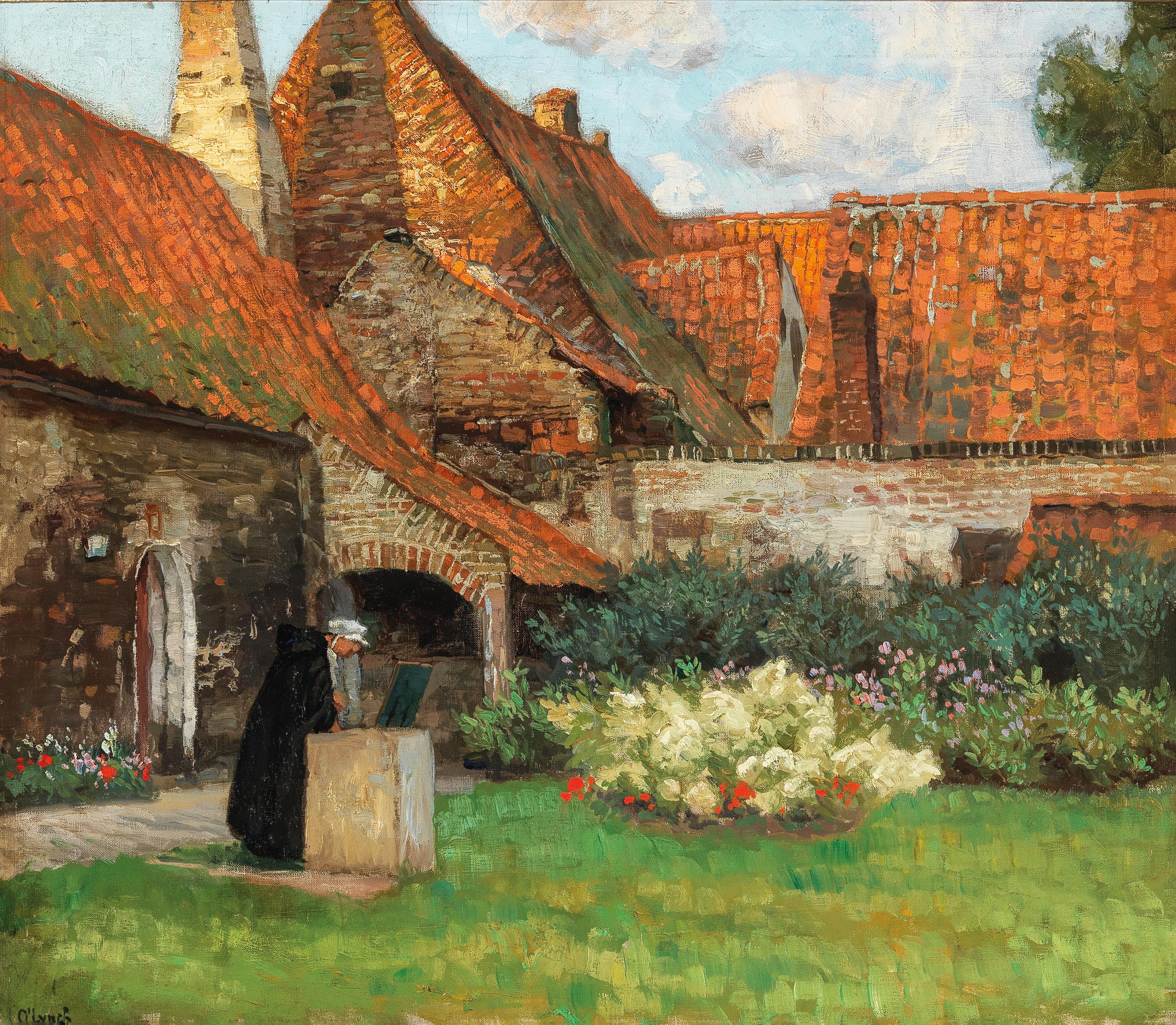
Courtyard in Summer

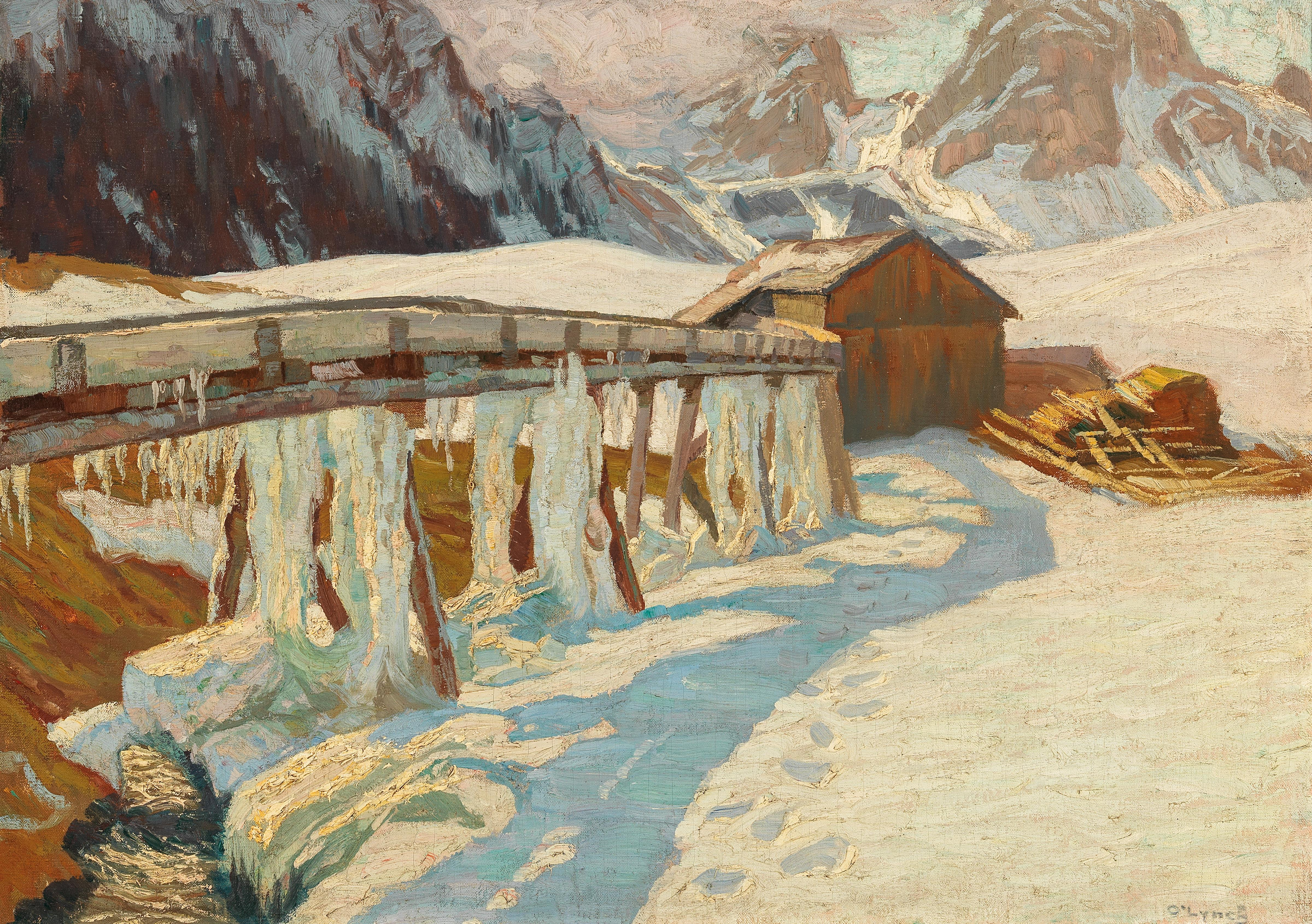
Winter Landscape with a Mill

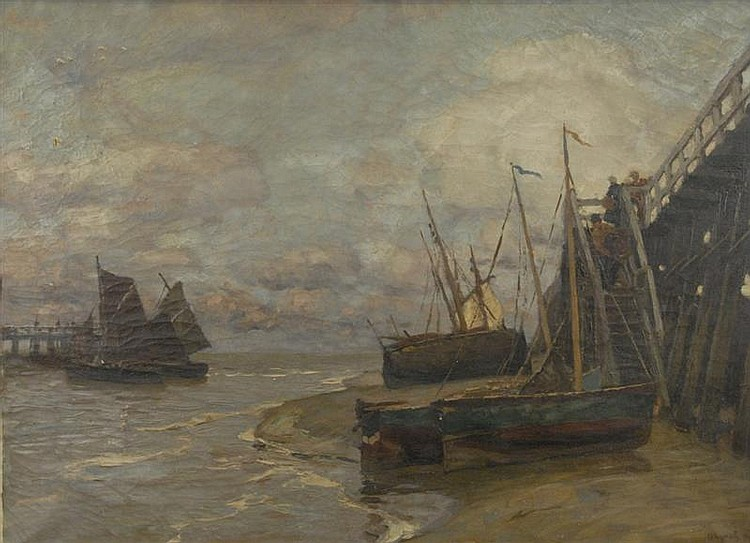
Fishing Boats at Newport

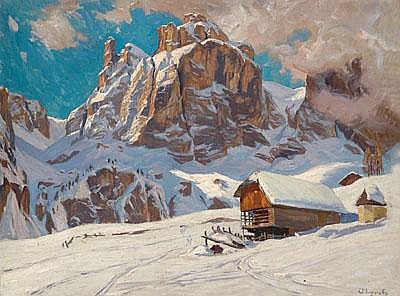
Winter in the Dolomites
