= Franziska Zach =

Austrian artist

- Born: 8 February 1900; Losenstein, Austria
- Died: 13 December 1930 (aged 30); Paris, France
- Known for: Painting
- Website: franziskazach.com

Franziska Zach (1900-1930) was an Austrian painter.

== Biography ==
Zach was born in Losenstein, Austria on 8 February 1900. She studied art at the University of Applied Arts Vienna where she studied with Alfred Böhm and Oskar Strnad. After studying painting she went on to learn enamel work at the studio of Josef Hoffmann. She was a member of Wiener Frauenkunst (Viennese Women's Art) and the Hagenbund.

Zach traveled to France and England, settling in Paris in 1930, where she died on 13 December 1930 at the age of 30.

== Legacy ==
Her work was included in the 2019 exhibition City Of Women: Female artists in Vienna from 1900 to 1938 at the Österreichische Galerie Belvedere.

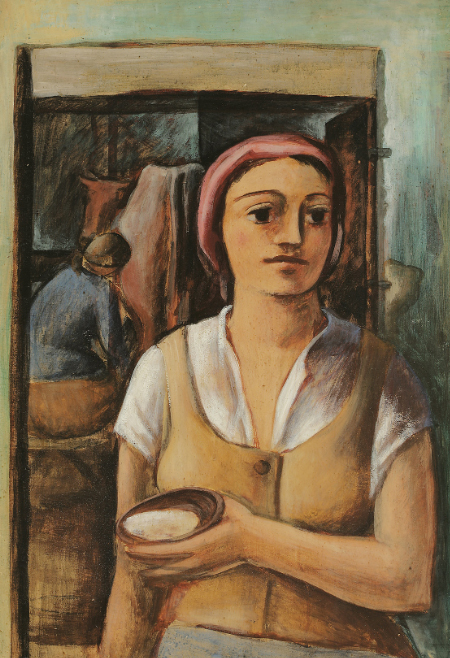
Frau mit Schale, 1926

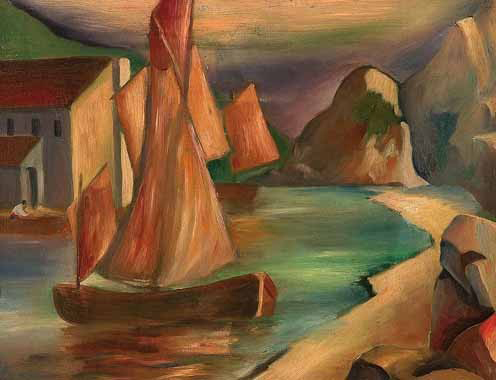
Boat near the bay, 1929

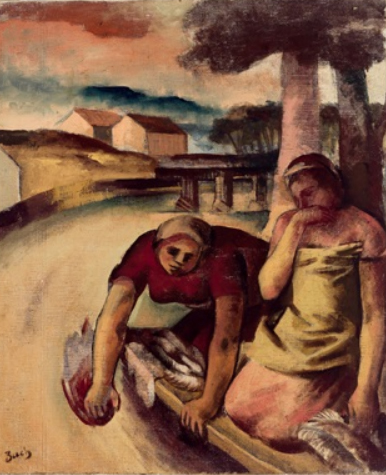
Beim Wäscheschwemmen, 1930
