= Schnackenburg (surname) =

Schnackenburg is a surname of German origin, originating as a surname for someone from the town of Schnackenburg. Notable people with the surname include:

- Hellmut Schnackenburg (1902–1974), German conductor and music director
- Rudolf Schnackenburg (1914–2002), German priest and scholar

== See also ==
- Schnackenburg, a town in Lower Saxony, Germany
- Schnackenberg
- Schnakenberg
