= Heinrich Knirr =

German painter (1862–1944)

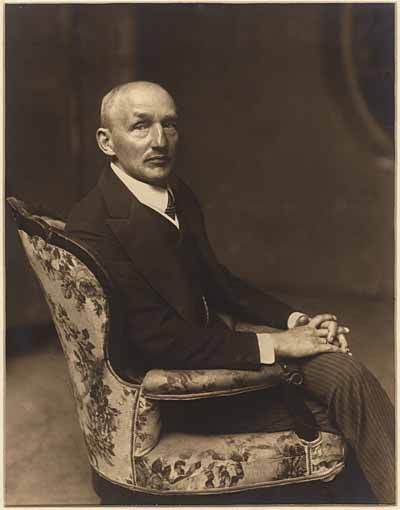
Heinrich Knirr (c.1910/14); photograph by Theodor Hilsdorf

Heinrich Knirr (2 September 1862 – 26 May 1944) was an Austrian Empire-born German painter, known for his genre scenes and portraits, although he also did landscapes and still-lifes. He is best known for creating the official portrait of Adolf Hitler for 1937 and is the only artist known to have painted Hitler in person.

== Biography ==
He was born in Pantschowa (in modern-day Serbia). He studied at the Academy of Fine Arts, Vienna, with Christian Griepenkerl and Carl Wurzinger, then attended the Academy of Fine Arts, Munich, where he took lessons from Gabriel von Hackl and Ludwig Löfftz.

In 1888 he founded a private painting school in Munich, which was very popular throughout Europe. He remained in Munich and opened a private art school there in 1888. Eventually, his school gained a good reputation throughout Europe. From 1898 to 1910, he also taught at the Munich Academy. He was also a member of the Munich Secession and, later, the Vienna Secession.

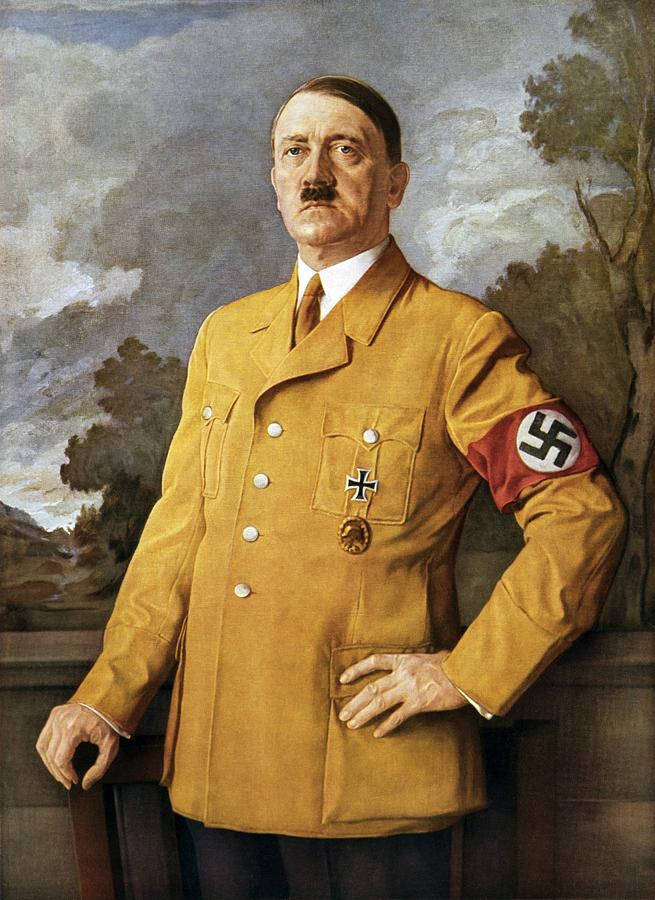
"Hitler, the Creator of the Third Reich and Renewer of German Art" (German: Adolf Hitler, der Schöpfer des Dritten Reiches und Erneuerer der deutschen Kunst), Hitler's official portrait in 1937 by Knirr

At the beginning of World War I, he gave up his teaching activities and moved to Starnberg. In the 1920s, the Thannhauser family became his major patrons. After 1922, he lived in Upper Bavaria. During the Nazi régime, he remained popular and, in 1937, was represented at the first Große Deutsche Kunstausstellung at the Haus der Kunst in Munich, with one of his portraits of Adolf Hitler.

Over the next few years, he exhibited fourteen works there altogether, including portraits of Hitler's private chauffeur, Julius Schreck, and his mother Klara. Both paintings were hung in Hitler's office at the Berghof in Berchtesgaden. He also did the official portrait of Rudolf Hess, and Albert Speer often referred to him as the "court painter".

In 1942, Knirr was awarded the Goethe-Medaille für Kunst und Wissenschaft. In 1944 he died in Staudach-Egerndach.

== Notable students ==
- Hugo Baar
- Erma Bossi
- Paula Deppe
- Fabius von Gugel
- Otto Illies
- Eugen von Kahler
- Paul Klee
- Rudolf Levy
- Vadym Meller
- Carl Montag
- Ernst Morgenthaler
- Otto Nückel
- Ernst Oppler
- Emil Orlík
- Wolf Röhricht
- Milena Pavlović-Barili
- Walter Schnackenberg
- Wilhelm Scholkmann
- Karl Staudinger
- Hermann Stenner
- Edmund Steppes
