= Wilhelm Scholkmann =

German painter

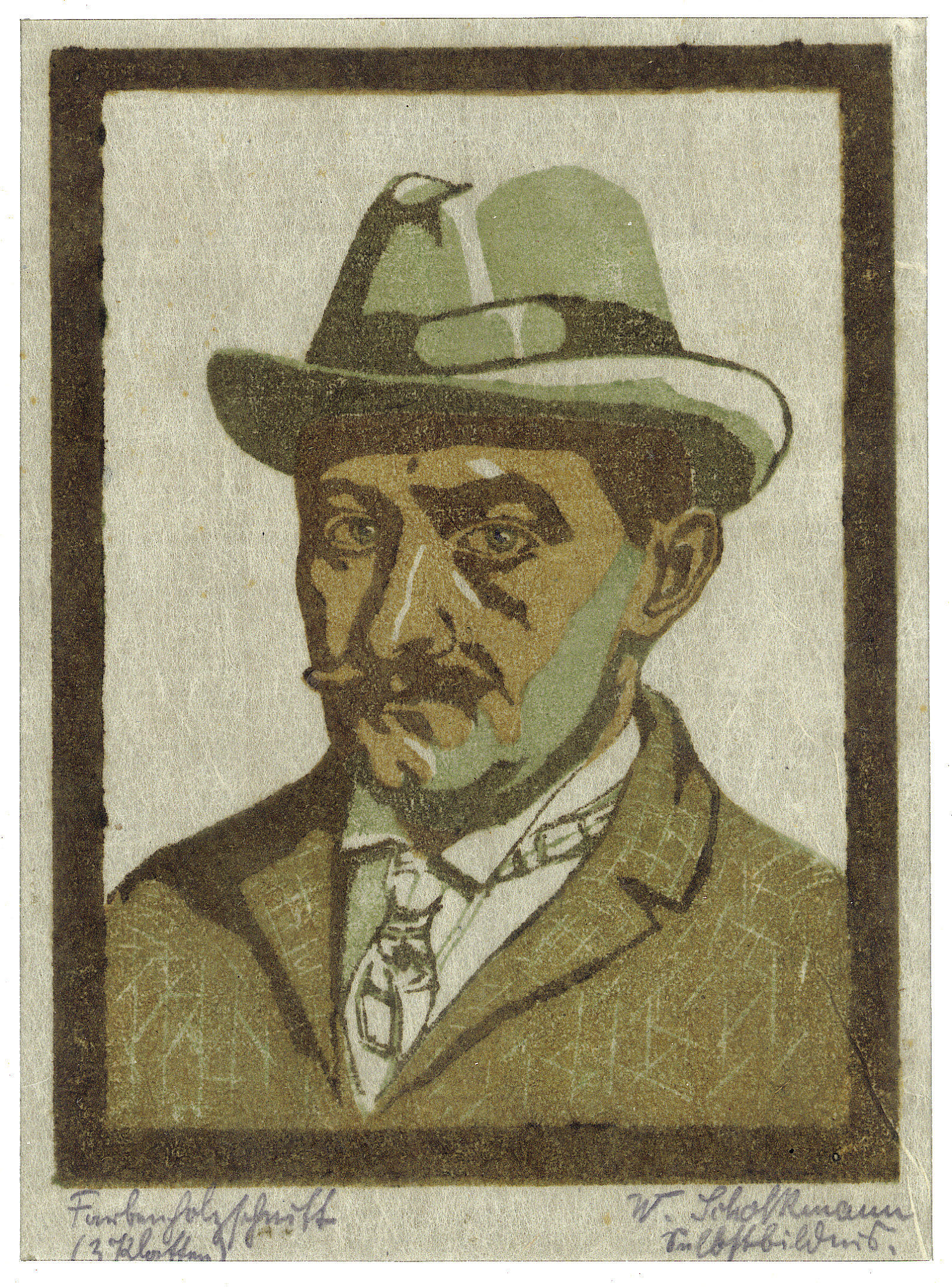
Self-portrait (Woodcut, date unknown)

Wilhelm Ludwig Adolph Scholkmann (25 December 1867, Berlin - 1944, Worpswede) was a German painter. His works were predominantly scenes of peasant life.

== Biography ==
His father, Adolf Scholkmann (1843–1907), was a theology Professor. His mother, Marie, née Bussmann, was the illegitimate child of a lady-in-waiting and a Hohenzollern prince. Although she had no problems with this, he was tormented by the thought and would eventually develop a persecution complex.

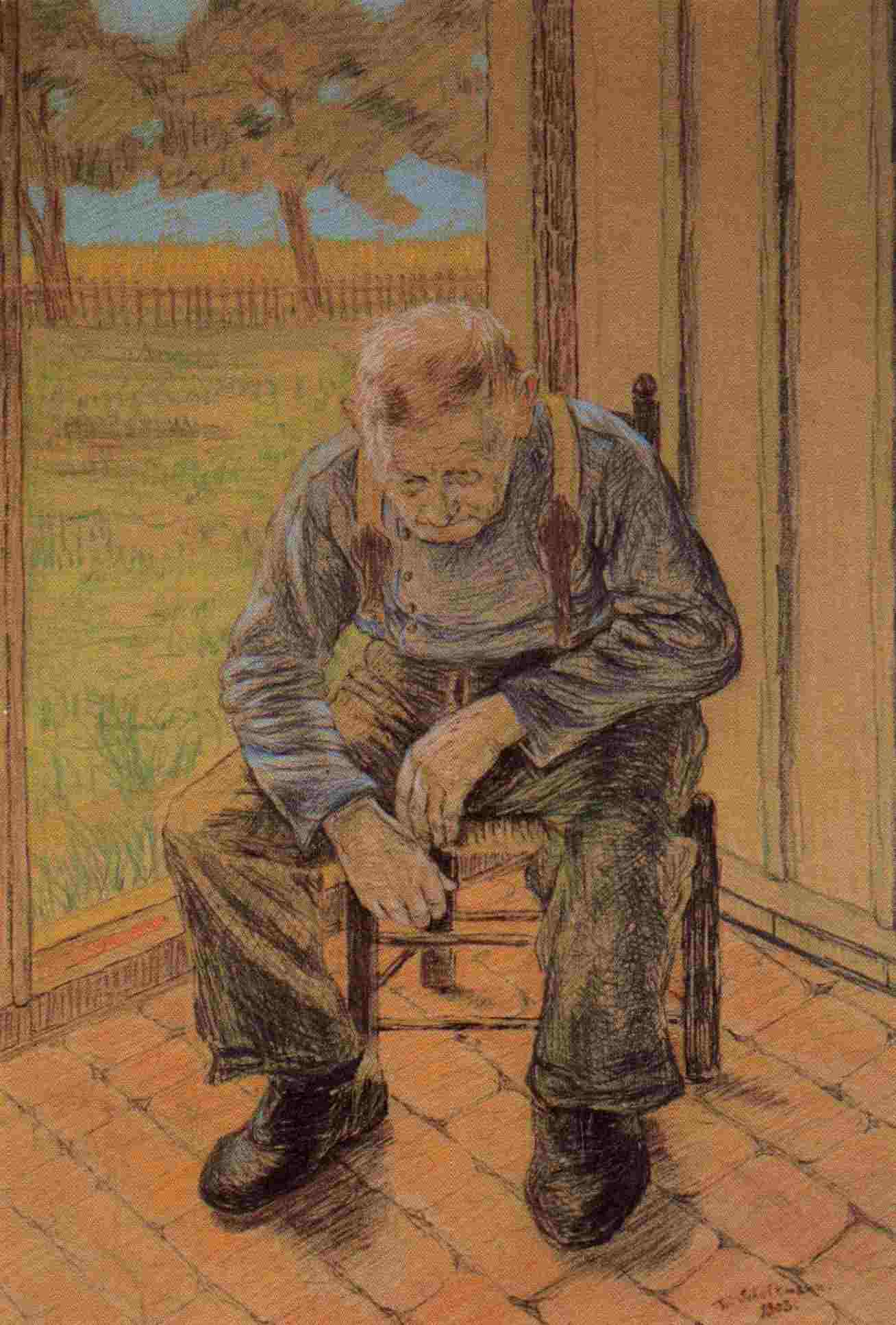
Seated Farmer

In 1888, after graduating from the gymnasium in Luisenstadt, he began studying art in Munich at the private art school operated by Heinrich Knirr. He also studied at the Academy of Fine Arts with Ludwig von Herterich and Johann Leonhard Raab. His parents pressed him to take up teaching or illustrating, as good sources of income, but he was unable to decide which direction to take. In 1891, he spent some time at the Dachau art colony, then went to schools in Paris and Düsseldorf, but still lacked any definite inspiration. Around 1900, he tried living at the artists' colony in Worpswede. He took part in a major exhibition at the Kunsthalle Bremen in 1904.

In the mid 1900s, his brother died of a lung disease, followed shortly after by his mother (who was only fifty), and his father. In 1908, he moved to Dötlingen, the site of another art colony, where he attempted to live on his small inheritance. The following year, he participated in an exhibition of the Oldenburg Art Association, at the Augusteum, but a serious disagreement with one of the Association's board members, aggravated by his moody temperament, caused him to withdraw.

In 1912, he moved to a small house in Osterdorf, near Worpswede, where he lived like a hermit. Although he did his best to save money and tried his hand at beekeeping, inflation ate up the rest of his capital. His dark and melancholy paintings of moors, heathers and poor peasants attracted little attention. His remaining relatives reluctantly took up the task of keeping the "crazy artist" from starving. They ended up buying most of his works, but he chose to remain a stranger to them.

His contact with the other artists at Worpswede was minimal, except for Otto Modersohn, but he maintained a correspondence with August von Brandis, which is the source of virtually all that is known of his final years. He attempted to make friends with Heinrich Vogeler, whose sister he wanted to marry, but they had a falling out. None of his later works have survived. He is believed to have destroyed them himself, during a fit of depression. His surviving works are widely scattered and no effort has been made to catalogue them.

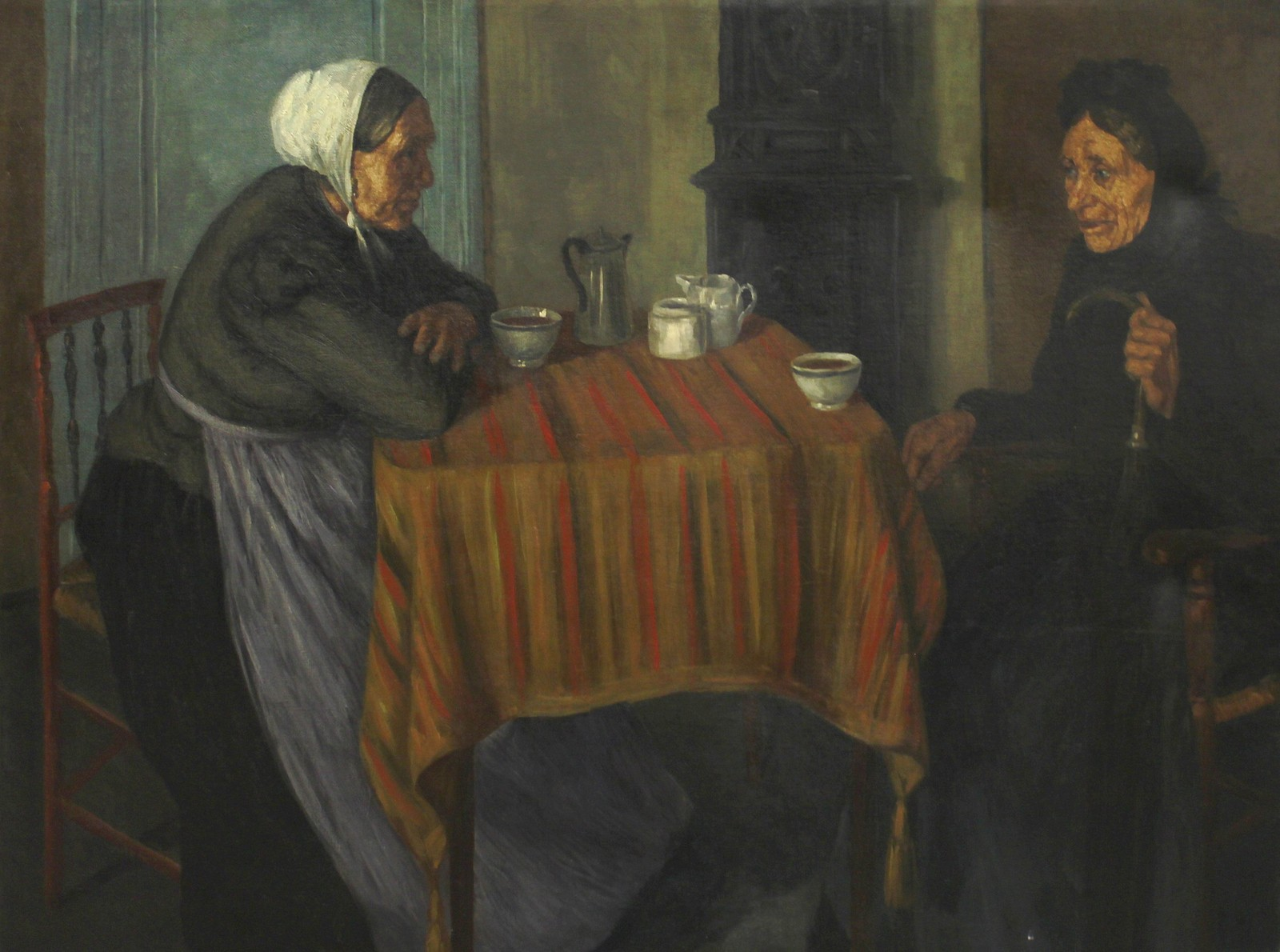
Two Women Having Afternoon Coffee

He died at the poorhouse in Worpswede, during the final stages of World War II. The exact date is unknown.

== Sources ==
- Ilse-Marie Barton: Wilhelm Scholkmann (Leben und Werk), in the Siegener Zeitung, 14 March 1981
- Gerhard Wietek: 200 Jahre Malerei im Oldenburger Land, Pg.24 ISBN 3-9801191-0-6
- Heinrich Poppe and Horst Wichmann: Neues Dötlinger Dorfbuch, Pg.112 ISBN 3-87358-113-2
- Donata Holz: Im Strom der Zeit, Pg.49 ISBN 978-3-00-019336-1
