= George Mayer-Marton =

Hungarian artist

- Born: Györg Mayer-Marton; 3 June 1897; Győr, Hungary
- Died: 8 August 1960 (aged 63); Liverpool, England
- Education: Academy of Fine Arts Vienna; Academy of Fine Arts, Munich
- Known for: Painting, murals

George Mayer-Marton (3 June 1897 – 8 August 1960) was a Hungarian Jewish artist who was a significant figure in Viennese art between the First and Second World Wars, working in oil, watercolour and graphics. Following his forced emigration to England in 1938, he continued to paint in watercolour and oil. He pioneered the technique of Byzantine mosaic in the UK.

== Biography ==
Mayer-Marton was born György, or Georg in German, later changed to George on British naturalization, in Győr, Kingdom of Hungary in 1897, and grew up during the final years of Austro-Hungary. He served in the Austro-Hungarian Army during the First World War. From 1919 to 1924 he studied art at the Academy of Fine Arts Vienna and Academy of Fine Arts, Munich, and also visited Ravenna in Italy. He settled in Vienna, and in 1927 became Secretary, later Vice-President, of the leading progressive society of Viennese artists, the Hagenbund. In 1928 he provided illustrations in the Chinese style for Der Kreidekreis ("The Chalk Circle") by Klabund and submitted paintings to the art competitions at the 1928 Summer Olympics, but did not win a medal. He was twice awarded the Ehrenpreis der Stadt Wien (1928 and 1936).

In 1938 following the Anschluss of Austria and the enactment of Hitler’s Nuremberg laws, Mayer-Marton and his wife, the pianist Grete Fried, fled to England. In 1940, during the London Blitz, his studio home in St John's Wood was burnt by an incendiary bomb. The majority of his life's work and personal possessions was destroyed. He was not in a position to paint in oil again until 1948. Mayer-Marton's parents had remained in Gyor and were eventually deported and murdered. When, in 1945, Mayer-Marton learned of their deaths he painted the work Women with Boulders, showing two figures in a bleak rock-strewn landscape.

Once in the UK Mayer-Marton worked for the predecessor of the Arts Council. In 1952, he took up the post of Senior Lecturer in the department of painting at the Liverpool College of Art and introduced the new subject of mural art.

Mayer-Marton was the first to introduce the technique of Byzantine-style facetted mosaics in the UK and executed a number of mural commissions from the Roman Catholic Church, decorating schools and churches in the North West of England. The Roman Catholic church of Holy Rosary in Fitton Hill, Oldham, opened in 1955, contains a significant mural. It is 8 m high and originally included frescos showing Mary and St John with a mosaic showing the crucifixion in the centre. The frescos were painted over with white emulsion paint in 1980. The church was closed in 2017 and was used for storage. An application for listing, submitted in August 2020 by Nick Braithwaite, the artist's great-nephew, and supported by SAVE Britain's Heritage, was considered by Historic England and in August 2022 the church was given Grade II listed status but not before it had been vandalised.

The other ecclesiastical mural by Mayer-Marton that survives in situ is above the high altars inside St Clare's RC Church in Blackley, which depicts Clare of Assisi. A mosaic by Mayer-Marton of the Pentecost was moved from the Church of the Holy Ghost, Netherton, when it was demolished in 1989 and installed in the Chapel of Unity in Liverpool Metropolitan Cathedral following a campaign led by the artist's niece Johanna Braithwaite.

He completed over 200 oil paintings while in Liverpool. Numerous works are held in private collections and also in public art galleries including: the Victoria and Albert Museum London; British Museum, London; Österreichische Galerie Belvedere Vienna; Albertina Vienna; Hungarian National Gallery, Budapest; Glynn Vivian Art Gallery, Swansea; Victoria Gallery & Museum Liverpool; the Wien Museum, Vienna; the Imperial War Museum London; the Walker Art Gallery, Liverpool; Derby Museum and Art Gallery; National Galleries of Scotland and the Scottish National Gallery of Modern Art.

Mayer-Marton died from leukaemia in Liverpool in August 1960, leaving several of his mosaic designs unfinished.

== Selected exhibitions ==
- Memorial Exhibition, 1960, Walker Art Gallery, Liverpool
- Walker Art Gallery, Liverpool, 1976
- Hagenbund, Historisches Museum der Stadt Wien, 1978
- Die uns verließen, Österreichische Galerie, Vienna, 1980
- Retrospective, Österreichische Galerie, Vienna 1986
- Art in Exile, Berlin, London, Vienna, 1985/86
- Centenary Exhibition, Györ, 1997
- "Unspeakable” - Imperial War Museum, London, 2008
- Forced Journeys: Artists in Exile in Britain c 1933–45, Ben Uri Gallery London, 2009
- Galerie bei der Oper, Vienna, 2014
- Hagenbund, Unteres Belvedere, Vienna, 2014–15

== Bibliography ==
- George Mayer-Marton Murals and Mosaics". Ed. R. Waterhouse.Baquis Press, Manchester, 2021
- Their Safe Haven: Hungarian Artists in Britain from the 1930s. Ed. R. Waterhouse. Baquis Press, Manchester, 2018
- Georg Mayer-Márton, Galerie bei der Oper, Exhibition Catalogue, Vienna 2014
- Hagenbund: A European Network of Modernism. Belvedere/Hirmer 2014
- Forced Journeys: Artists in Exile in Britain c.1933-45, Behr et al. Ben Uri 2009
- The Hagenbund: The Lost Modernists. Österreichische Galerie, 1993
- Austrian National Gallery – Georg Mayer-Marton Retrospective Catalogue, 1986
- George Mayer-Marton Memorial Exhibition Catalogue, 1997
