= Otto Illies =

German painter

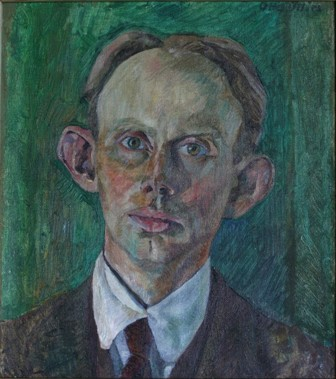
Self-portrait (c.1912), Gleimhaus, Halberstadt

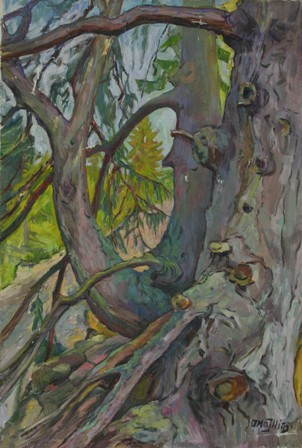
Tree Roots

Otto Illies (25 January 1881 in Yokohama – 22 February 1959 in Wernigerode) was a German Expressionist landscape painter.

== Biography ==
His father was the overseas merchant, Carl Illies, a pioneer in German-Japanese trade. He spent part of his childhood there, then was returned to Germany to attend school; first in Blankenese and later in the countryside in Schleswig-Holstein. From 1898 to 1899, he received private painting lessons from Georg Burmester in Kiel, then from Ernst Eitner in Hamburg (1900-1901). After that, he took courses in art history at the Ludwig-Maximilians-Universität München and attended classes in nude painting led by Heinrich Knirr.

From 1903 to 1908, he took further classes in nude painting from Ludwig von Hofmann (who later became a friend and supporter) at the Grand-Ducal Saxon Art School, Weimar. It was there he came into contact with Neoimpressionism but, after experimenting with that style, turned decisively away from it. After completing his classes, he exhibited with the Berlin Secession and established a studio community with his former classmate from Munich, Hans Delbrück.

In 1910, both of his parents died, leaving him a considerable fortune. The following year, he used some of it to build a villa in Falkenstein (an outlying district of Hamburg), designed by the architect, Walther Baedeker (1880-1959), where he established his studio. In 1920, he became a member of the Hamburgische Künstlerschaft and, two years later, of the Hamburger Künstlerverein von 1832. In 1924, he relocated to Wernigerode, in Harz, where he died in 1959.

He was primarily known as a landscape painter, with a special focus on fruit trees, although he also painted quarries and pinges. His next most numerous works involved flowers and interiors. On the 50th anniversary of his death, in 2009, the Gleimhaus in Halberstadt, which maintains a large part of his estate, held a major retrospective.
