= Alexander Demetrius Goltz =

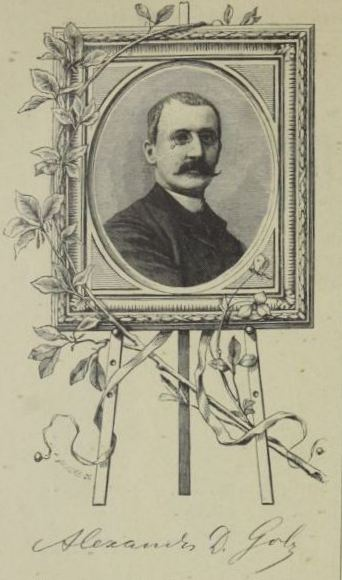
Self-portrait; from the Neue Illustrirte Zeitung (1889)

Alexander Demetrius Goltz (25 January 1857, Püspökladány – 14 May 1944, Vienna) was a painter from Austria-Hungary and later Austria. He was also an illustrator and scenic designer.

== Biography ==
He was the son of a railway engineer and, after the age of two, grew up in Vienna. From 1874 to 1875, he studied with Otto Seitz at the Academy of Fine Arts, Munich. Then, for the next two years, he was a student of Anselm Feuerbach at the Academy of Fine Arts, Vienna. His first exhibition was in 1876 and he became a member of the Vienna Künstlerhaus.

This was followed by several study trips, a stay in Munich from 1884 to 1888, and studies with Pierre Puvis de Chavannes in Paris. He finally returned to Vienna in 1892. Beginning as a history painter, he later turned to landscapes and portraits. From 1904 to 1907, he was in charge of the scenic equipment at the Burgtheater, then held the same position at the Vienna State Opera from 1909 to 1910. During this time, he painted the portraits of numerous performers; notably Josef Kainz.

He was a member of the Hagenbund from 1900 to 1911 and served as its President for the year 1906/07. During the First World War, he served as a battle painter for the Imperial Kriegspressequartier and worked at the fronts in Belgium, Russia, Italy, Serbia and Turkey. Most of these paintings are now on display at the Museum of Military History.

From 1925 to 1929, he was President of the Artists' Cooperative at the Künstlerhaus. He was married twice. His second wife (whom he married in 1909) was the actress Mary Mell (1885-1954), sister of the writer, Max Mell. In 1927, he became a citizen of Vienna and is buried at the Zentralfriedhof.

== Selected paintings ==
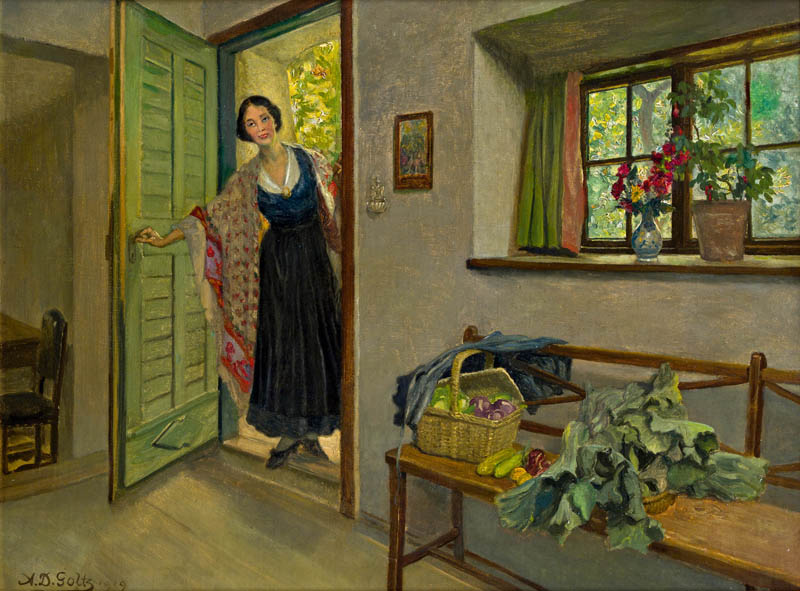
The Visitor

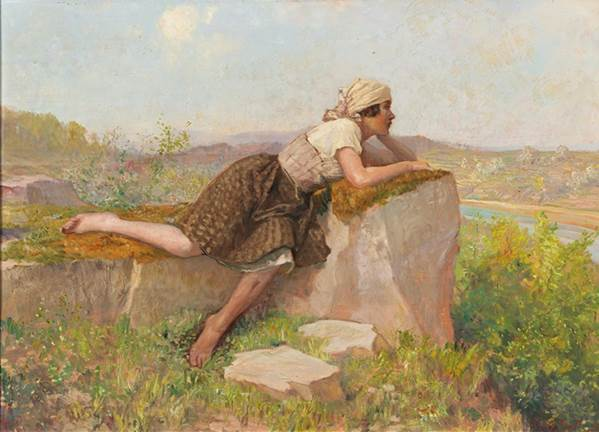
Spring

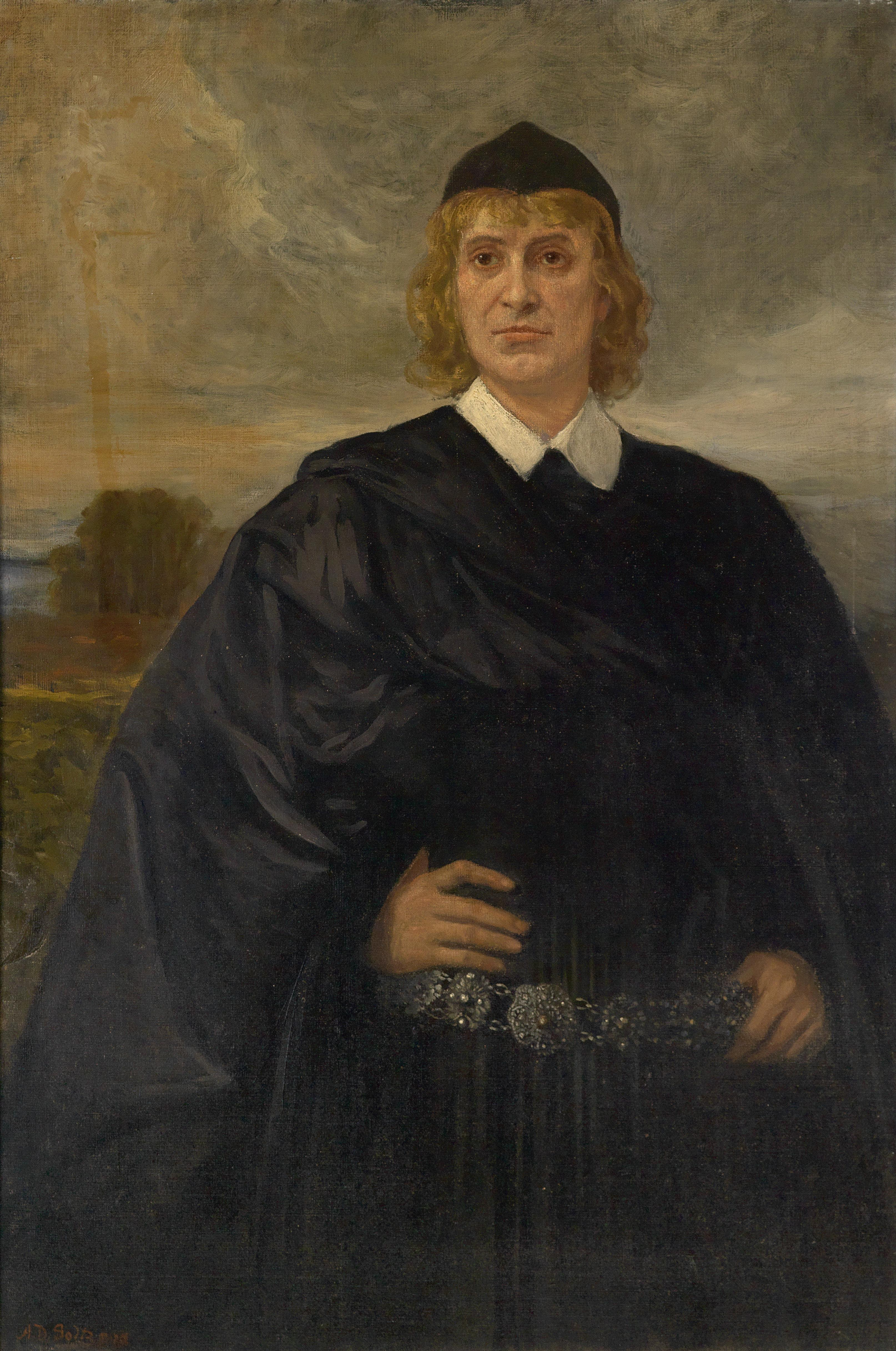
Josef Kainz as Torquato Tasso

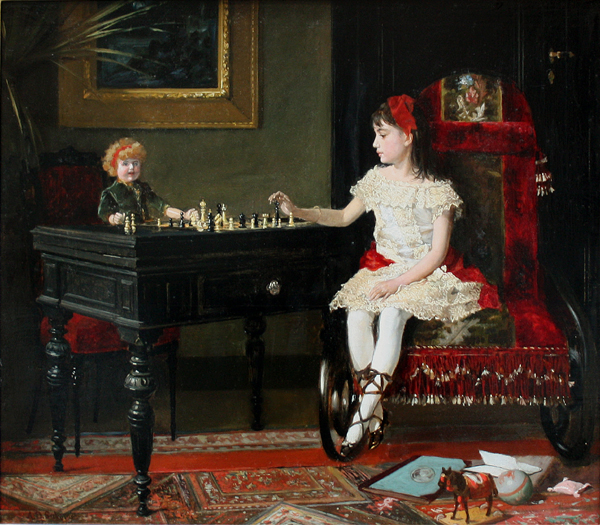
Girl with a Puppet
