= Hagenbund =

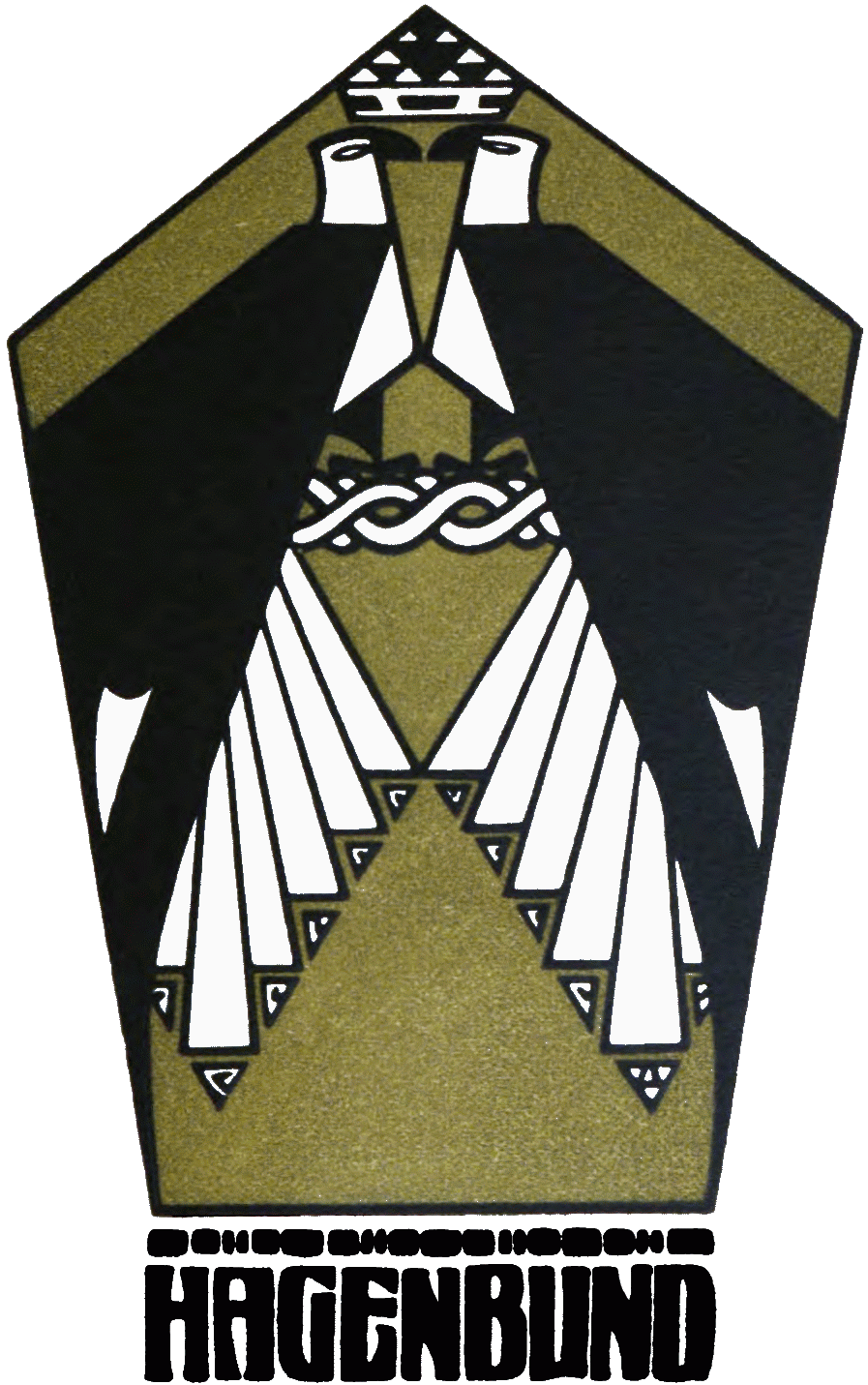
Cover illustration of a Hagenbund i1904-1905 Joseph Urban

The Hagenbund or Künstlerbund Hagen was a group of Austrian artists that formed in 1899. The group's name derived from the name Herr Hagen, the proprietor of an inn in Vienna which they frequented.

== Early history ==
The group's most prominent members early on were Heinrich Lefler and Joseph Urban, who had originally worked and exhibited within the conservative Vienna Künstlerhaus, but now, like the Vienna Secession, rebelled against the establishment and formed their own organization.

The Hagenbund operated for almost a decade in the shadow of the popular and successful Secession, and only in the years that followed the damaging resignation of the Klimt Group from the Secession did its members succeed in developing a more moderate, independent line, in which atmosphere played a major role.

== After World War I ==
After 1918, the formal language of the Hagenbund came to dominate artistic activity in Vienna, and in the 1920s it provided the most important focus for new artistic currents. Among its members during this period were Theodore Fried, Oskar Laske, Anton Hanak, Carry Hauser, Georg Mayer-Marton, Georg Merkel, Sergius Pauser, Fritz Schwarz-Waldegg, Otto Rudolf Schatz, Albin Egger-Lienz and Oskar Kokoschka.

They disassociated themselves from both the Secession and Expressionism on essential questions of aesthetics. They may have approved of the Expressionists’ search for realism, but the expressive formal solutions they found conflicted with the Hagenbund’s own artistic objectives.

== The Dissolution of the Hagenbund in 1938 ==
In March 1938, a few days after the Anschluss of Austria into the German Reich, the administration of both the Hagenbund and the Secession were brought into line with the thinking of the Nazi party by existing members of the respective organisation. In the case of the Hagenbund the leading figure was Leopold Blauensteiner and the art of the Hagenbund was described as Verfallskunst or decadent art. Many of the Jewish members of the Hagenbund were to flee from Austria at this point and the assets of the Hagenbund were re-allocated to the Association of Visual Artists. It was declared defunct on 29 September 1938.

== Members and Guest Members of the Hagenbund ==
This listing is taken from Chrastek. About 250 artists, architects and interior and graphic designers are listed, but as the Nazis destroyed the archives of the Hagenbund in September 1939, the listing has had to be reconstructed and may be incomplete. In addition just under 1,300 guest artists exhibited at Hagenbund exhibitions. These included Edgar Degas, Josef Dobrowsky, Raoul Dufy, Lyonel Feininger, Gerhart Frankl, Sebastian Isepp, Oskar Kokoschka, Jacques Lipchitz, Adolf Loos, Henri Matisse, Edvard Munch, Emil Nolde, Max Pechstein, Pablo Picasso, Auguste Renoir, Auguste Rodin, and Ferdinand Georg Waldmuller

=== Ordinary Members ===
- Friedrich Aduatz (1907-1994)
- Artur Oscar Alexander (1876-1953)
- Eduard Amseder (1856-1938)
- Robin Christian Andersen (1890-1969)
- Hugo Baar (1873-1912)
- Rudolph Bachmann (1877-1933)
- Gustav Bamberger (1861-1936)
- Otto Barth (1876-1916)
- Franz Barwig (1868-1931) Sculptor
- Otto Bariedl (1881-1961)
- Hans Sidonius Becker (1895-1945)
- Josep Johann Beyer (1861-1933)
- Leopold Blauensteiner (1880-1947)
- Anton Bleichsteiner (1879-1963)
- Peter Breithut (1869-1930)
- Hans Bren (1900-1974)
- Otto Bruenauer (1877-1912)
- Rudolf Buchner (1894-1962)
- Leopold Burger (1861-1903)
- Alfred Cossmann (1870-1951)
- Wunibald Deininger (1879 -1963) Architect
- Leo Delitz (1882-1965). Emigrated to London 1938
- Josef Dobner (1898-1972) Sculptor
- Thomas Dobner (1903-1971). Architect
- Ferdinand Dorsch (1875-1938)
- Richard Drasche-Wartinberg (1850-1923)
- Viktor Echhardt von Eckardsburg (1864-1946)

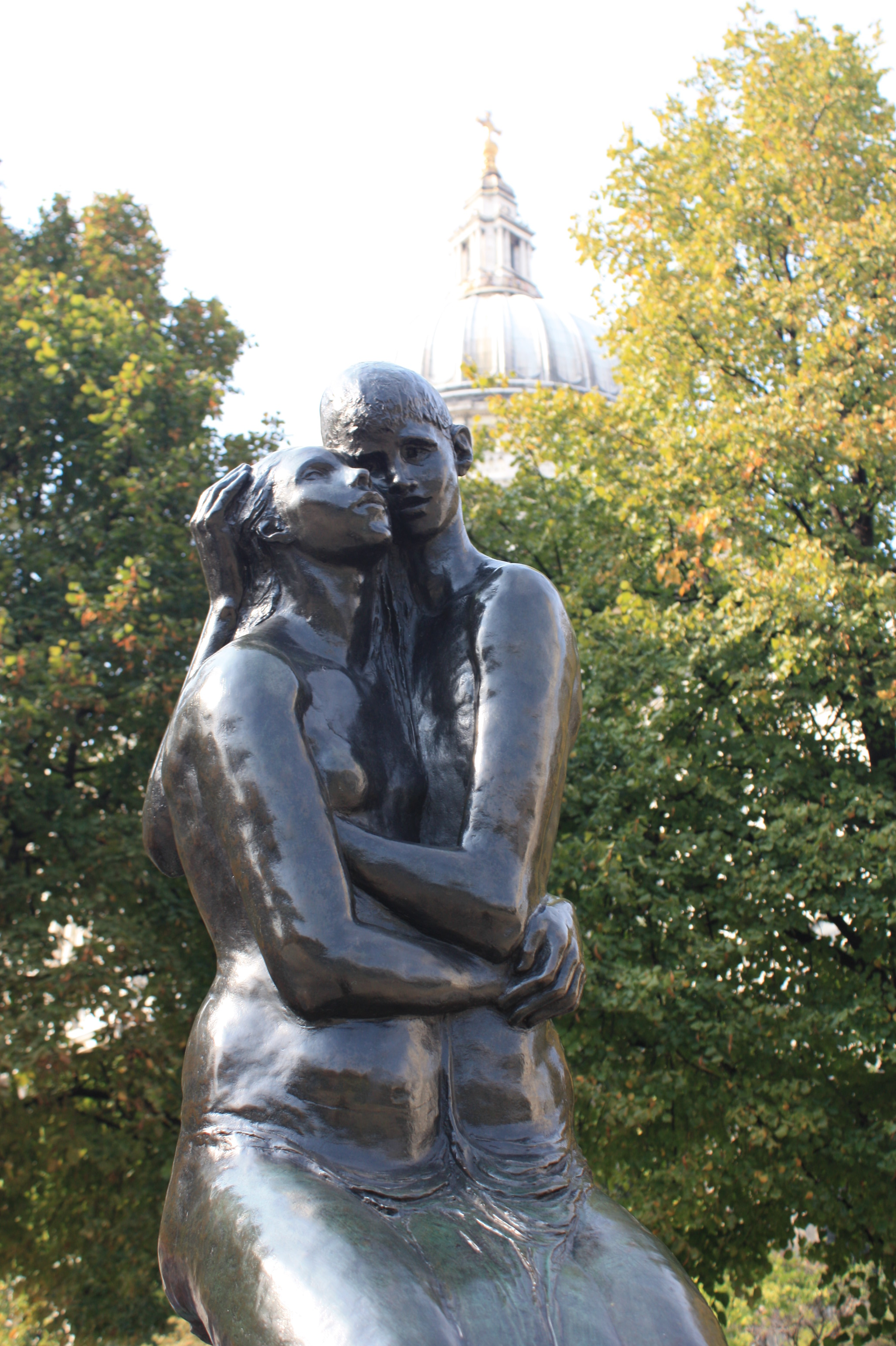
The Young Lovers by George Ehrlich, St Pauls Cathedral Gardens

- Georg Ehrlich (1897-1966) Sculptor and Graphic Artist. Emigrated to England 1937.
- Carl Fahringer (1874-1952)
- Rudolf Fanner (1879-1959) Sculptor
- Oskar Felgel (1876-1957)
- Béni Ferenczy (1890-1967). Sculptor and Graphic artist
- Robert Fink (1878-1950)
- Johannes Fischer (1888-1955)
- Josef Floch (1894-1977) Emigrated to the USA, 1941
- Raoul Frank (1876-1939)
- Theodore Fried (1902-1980) Emigrated to the USA, 1942
- Eduard Gaertner (1890-1966)
- Johann Nepomuk Geller (1860-1954)
- Tibor Gergely (1900-1978) Emigrated to the USA, 1939
- Raimund Germela (1868-1945)
- Jacob Glasner (1879-1942)
- Alexander Demetrius Goltz (1857-1944)
- Leopold Gottlieb (1883-1934)
- Ferdinand Ludwig Graf 1868-1932)
- Adolf Gross (1873-1937)
- Fritz Gross (1895-1969). Emigrated to London 1938
- Karl Josef Gunsam (1900-1972)
- Gustav Gurschner (1873-1970). Sculptor
- Sigmund Walter Hampel. (1867-1949)
- Felix Albrecht Harta(1884-1967)
- Kark Ludwig Hassmann (1869-1933)
- Karl Hauk (1898-1974)
- Carry Hauser (1895-1985)
- Hans von Hayek (1869-1940)
- Fritz Hegenbart (1864-1943)
- Emanuel Franz Hegenbarth (1866-1923)
- Rolf Eugen Heger (1892-1954) Architect
- Wilhelm Hedger (1868-1942)
- Josef Heu (1876-1952)
- Hans Hloucal (1888-1944) Architect and interior designer
- August Hoffmann von Vestenhof (1849-1923)
- Otto Hoffmann (1866- after 1937) Architect and interior designer
- Karl Huck ((1876-1926)
- Josef Humplik (1888-1958) Sculptor
- Bohumír Jaroněk (1866-1933)
- Georg Jung (1899-1957)
- Julius Paul Junghanns (1876-1958)
- Ludwig Heinrich Jungnickel (1881-1965)
- Rudolf Junk (1880-1943)
- Maximilian Kahrer (1878-1937)
- Eduard Kasparides (1858-1926)
- Wilhelm Kaufmann (1895–1975)
- Alfred Keller (1875-1945) Architect
- Theodor Kern (1900-1969)
- Wilhelm Klier (1900-1968)
- Robert Kloss (1889-1950)
- Friedrich von Knapitsch (1880-1962)
- Robert Kohl (1891-1944)
- Rudolf Konopa (1864-1936)
- Ludvík Kuba (1863-1956)
- Gotthardt Kuehl (1850-1915)
- Erwin Lang (1886-1962)
- Carl Olof Larsson (1853-1919)
- Oskar Laske (1874-1951)
- Heinrich Lefler (1863-1919)
- Franz Lerch ((1895-1975) Forced to emigrate to New York in 1939 as his wife was Jewish.
- Hans Letz (1908-1983)
- Alfred Loeb (1885 -before 1945). Died at Prinknash Abbey
- Jacob Low (1887-1968). Emigrated to Palestine in 1939.
- Adolf Luntz(1875-1924)
- Richard Lux (1877-1939)
- Karl Markus (1899-1974)
- Georg Mayer-Marton (1897-1960) Emigrated in 1938 to England and died at Liverpool
- Karl Mediz (1868-1945)
- Georg Merkel (1881-1976)
- Ferdinand Michl (1877-1951)
- Fritz Berthold Neuhaus (1882- ?after 1950)
- Robert Oerley (1876-1945) Architect, designer and artist
- Karl O'Lynch von Town (1869-1942)
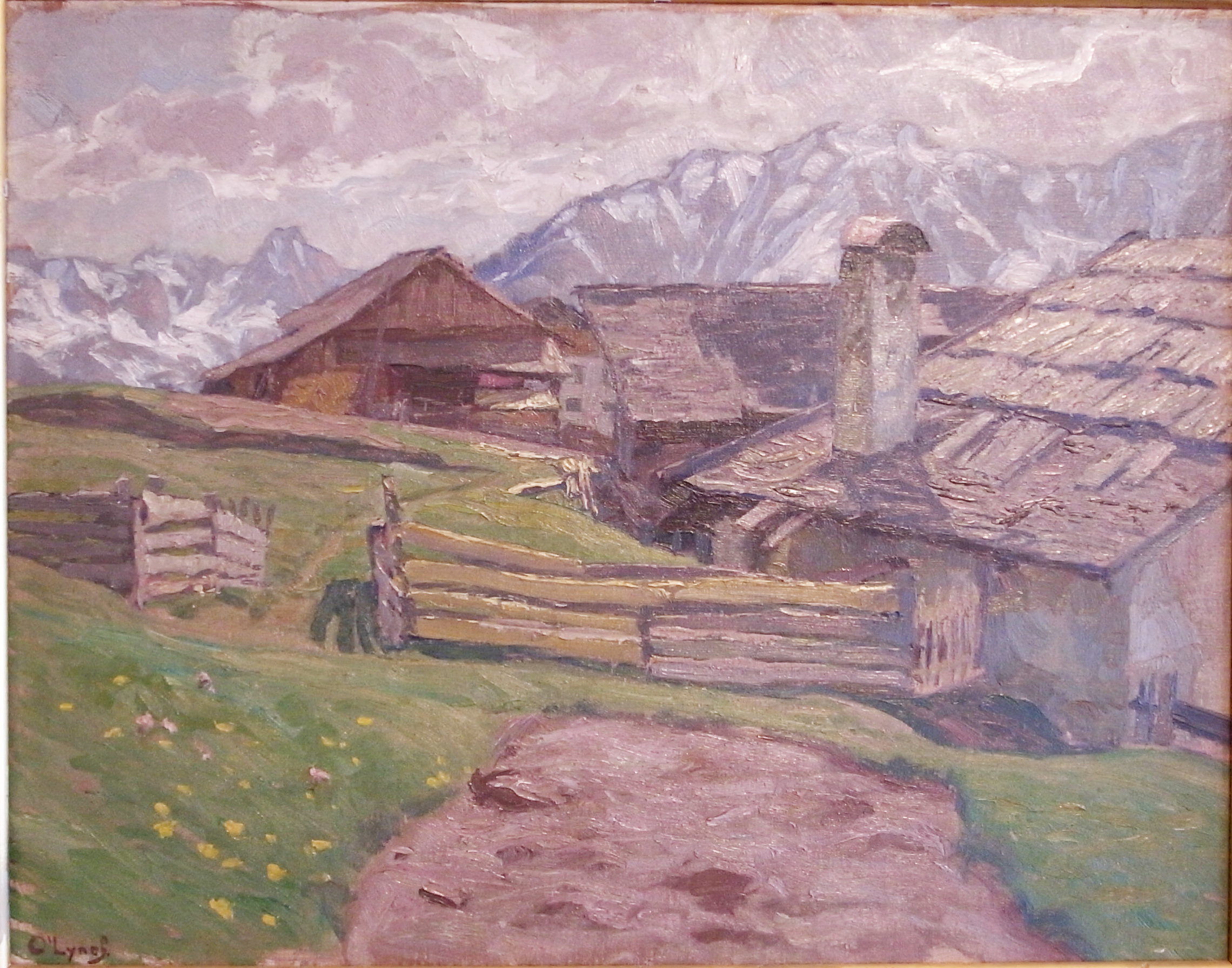
  Karl O'Lynch, Alm Landschaft
- Ernst Paar (1906-1986)
- Robert Pajer-Gartegen (1886-1944)
- Gino Parin (1876-1944) Died at Bergen-Belsen
- Clemens von Pausinger (1855-1936)
- Ernst Payer(1862-1937)
- Anton Peschka (1885-1940)
- Georg Pevetz (1983-1971)
- Robert Phillipi (1877-1959)
- Karl Pippich (1862-1932)
- Viktor Planckh (1904-1941)
- Rudolf Pointner (1907-1991)
- Franz Polzer (1875-1930) Architect
- Heribert Potuznik (1910-1984)
- Michael Powolny (1871-1954) Potter and sculptor
- Lois Pregartbauer (1899-1971)
- Alfons Purtscher (1885-1962)
- Friedrich von Radler (1876-1942)
- Hans Ranzoni der Ältere (1868-1956)
- Johann Rathausky (1858-1912)
- Maximilian Reinitz (1872-1935)
- Paul Johann Ress (1878-1952)
- Albert Reuss (1889-1975)
- Heinrich Revy (1883-1949)
- Ferdinand von Rezniček (1868-1909)
- Gottfried Richter (1904-1968)
- Thomas Riss (1871-1959)
- Augustin Roth (1864-1952)
- Josef Karl Rumpold (1893-1943)
- Herbert Schaffgotsch (1860-1943)
- Emerich Schaffran (1883-1962)
- Otto Rudolf Schatz (1900-1961)
- Robert Schiff (1869-1935)
- Ferdinand Schirnböck (1859-1930)
- Fritz Schwarz-Waldegg (1889-1942}
- Alois Leopold Seibold (1879-1951)
- Kazimierz Sichulski (1879-1942)
- Rudolf Sieck (1877-1957)
- Imre Simay (1874-1955)
- Ferdinand Staeger (1880-1976)
- Heinz Steiner (1905-1974)
- Karl Stemolak (1875-1954)
- Josef Straka (1864-1946)
- Ferdinand Stransky (1904-1981)
- Theodor Stundl (1875-1934)
- Eugen Sturm-Skrla (1894-1943)
- Emil Strecker (1841-1925)
- Maximilian Suppantschitsch (1865-1953)
- Josef Tautenhayn (1837-1911)
- Franz Thiele (1868-1945)
- Eduard Thöny (1866-1950)
- Viktor Tischler (1890-1951)
- Heinrich Tomec (1863-1928)
- Rudolf Tropsch (1870-?) Architect and furniture designer
- Joseph Urban (1872-1933) Architect, Opera designer
- Henryk Uziembło (1879-1949)
- Ernst Wagner (1877-1951)
- Alfred Wesemann (1874-?)
- Konrad Widter (1861-1904)
- Karl Alexander Wilke (1879-1954)
- Hans Wilt (1867-1917)
- Wilhelm Wodnansky (1876-1958)
- Georg Philipp Wörlen (1886-1954)
- Heinrich Zita (1882-1951)
- Alfred Zoff (1852-1927)
- Anders Zorn (1860-1920)
- Heinrich von Zügel (1850-1941)
- Ludwig von Zumbusch (1861-1927)

=== Extraordinary Members ===
These were female artists who from 1924 onwards could participate in discussions and exhibit their paintings, but had no right to vote.

- Anna Lesznai (1885-1966)
- Bettina Ehrlich (1903-1985)
- Hermine Aichenegg (1915-2007)
- Anny Schröder-Ehrenfest (1898-1972)
- Elsa Kalmár von Köveshazi (1876-1956)
- Frieda Salvendy (1887-1968)
- Hildegard Jone-Humplik (1891-1963)
- Johanna Kampmann-Freund (1888-1940)
- Lilly Steiner (1884-1961)
- Maria Fischer (1886-1955)
- Nora Purtscher-Wydenbruck (1894-1959)
- Franziska Zach (1900-1930)

=== Corresponding members ===
- Hugo Boettinger (1880-1934)
- Jan Honsa (1876-1937)
- Jan Štursa (1880-1925)
- Georg Wrba (1872-1939)

=== Guest members ===
- Anton Faistauer (1887-1930)
- Anton Kolig (1886-1950)
- Ernst Stöhr (1860-1917)
- Franz Wiegele (1887-1944)
- Georg Gerlach (1874-1962)
- Helene Funke (1869-1957)
- Leopold Forstner (1878-1936)
- Oskar Kokoschka (1886-1980)
- Stephanie Hollenstein (1886-1944)
- Trude Waehner (1900-1979)
