= Walter Schnackenberg =

German painter and illustrator

Walter Schnackenberg (2 May 1880, Lauterberg - 10 January 1961, Degerndorf im Landkreis Rosenheim) was a German painter and illustrator.

== Life ==
He went to Munich aged 19 to study under Heinrich Knirr and then Franz von Stuck, where he gained a reputation for drawings and caricatures. In the following years his drawings appeared in the art magazine Jugend and the satirical magazine "Simplicissimus". He traveled to Paris several times, where he met Picasso in 1908-1909 in Montparnasse and was inspired by the works of Henri de Toulouse-Lautrec. 1908/09 Paris, Montparnasse, acquaintance with Picasso. He married the daughter of Carl von Thieme, co-founder of the Münchener Rückversicherungs-Gesellschaft (MüRück, Münchener Rück, Munich Re) and the Allianz Versicherung. In 1907, Thieme and MüRück participated in the founding of the Europäischen Güter- und Reisegepäck-Versicherungs-AG in Budapest.

He also designed stage sets, theatre costumes and posters, including a signed one around 1920 for his father-in-law's Europäische Güter- und Reisegepäck-Versicherungs-AG travel insurance firm and examples for Munich's Deutsches Theater.
