= Rudolf Bacher =

Austrian painter and sculptor (1862–1945)

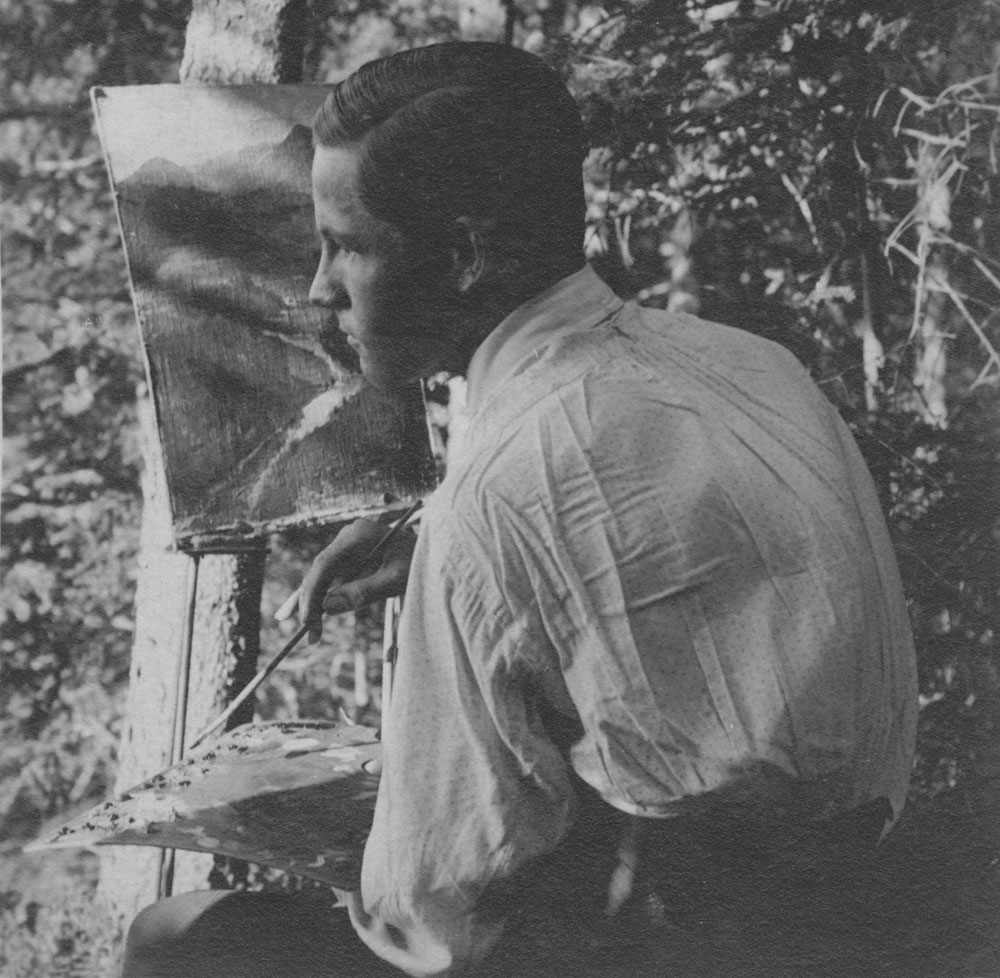
A young Rudolf Bacher at his easel (date unknown)

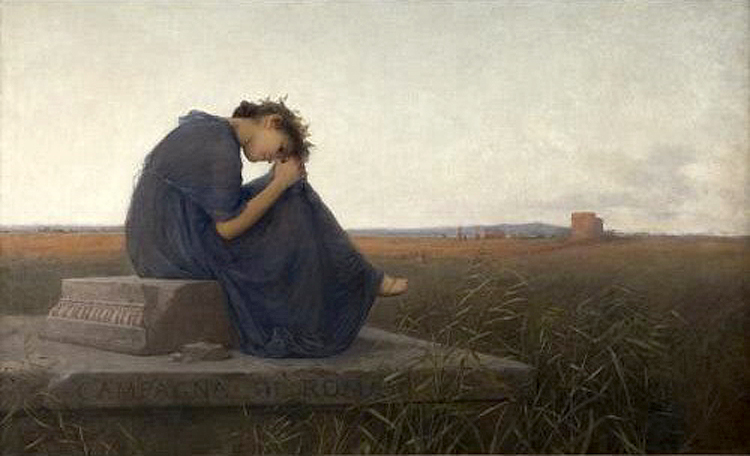
The Tomb of Caecilia Metella

Rudolf Bacher (20 January 1862, in Vienna – 16 April 1945, in Vienna) was an Austrian painter and sculptor.

== Life and work ==
From 1882 to 1888, he studied at the Academy of Fine Arts, Vienna, with Leopold Carl Müller, and the history painter, Christian Griepenkerl. His early paintings were mostly devoted to religious themes. From 1894, he was a member of the Vienna Künstlerhaus.

He was one of the founding members of the Vienna Secession, and served two terms as its President (1904-1905, 1912-1914). In 1896, he was awarded a small gold medal at the Große Berliner Kunstausstellung. He was a regular contributor of drawings and woodcuts to the magazine, Ver Sacrum

From 1903 to 1933, he was a professor at his alma mater, the Vienna Academy. In his later years, he focused on portrait painting and small animal sculptures.

On the occasion of his 80th birthday, in 1942, he was presented with the Goethe-Medaille für Kunst und Wissenschaft and the Ehrenring der Stadt Wien. He was also named an honorary member of the Academy.
