= Theodor von Hörmann =

Austrian painter (1840–1895)

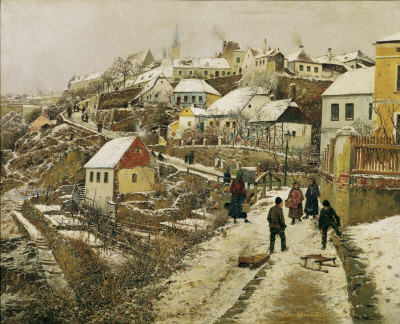
Znaim in the Snow

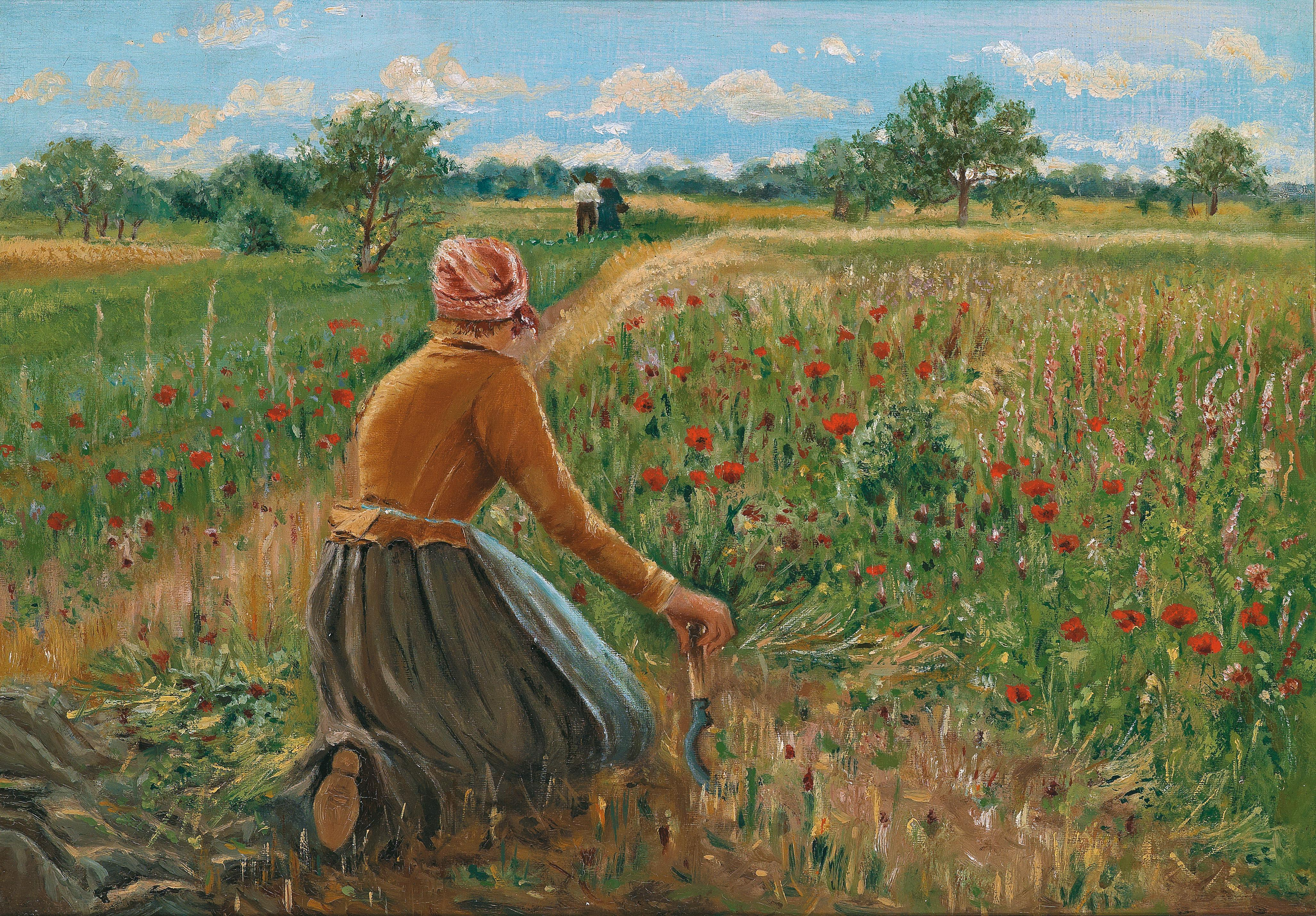
Farm Woman with Sickle

Theodor Hörmann von Hörbach (13 December 1840 – 1 July 1895) was an Austrian landscape painter.

== Biography ==
Theodor Hörmann von Hörbach was born on 13 December 1840 in Imst. He began his career in the Austrian Army and served during the Second Italian War of Independence (known as the Sardinian War in Austria), followed by service in the Austro-Prussian War. He reached the rank of Oberleutnant.

From 1873 to 1875, he studied at the Academy of Fine Arts, Vienna, with Eduard Peithner von Lichtenfels and Anselm Feuerbach. After that, he taught drawing and fencing at the Military Realschule in Sankt Pölten.

In 1884, he got married and retired from military service. He undertook several study trips and lived in Paris from 1886 to 1890, where he came under the influence of Impressionism. From 1890 to 1893, he lived in Znojmo, then settled in Vienna, becoming a member of the Künstlerhaus.

He died in Graz on 1 July 1895 while returning from a trip to Italy and was buried in Vienna Central Cemetery.
