= Azora, the Daughter of Montezuma =

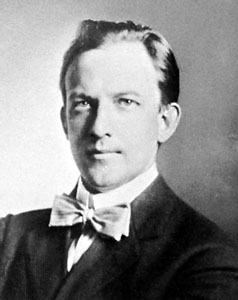
Henry Kimball Hadley

Azora, The Daughter of Montezuma is a 1917 opera in three acts by American composer Henry Kimball Hadley to a libretto in English by author David Stevens.

== Synopsis ==
The story takes place at the time of the conquest of the Aztecs by Cortés. Xalca, the Tlascalan prince, and Ramatzin, general of Montezuma's army, vie for the hand of Montezuma's daughter Azora; the former having prevailed, Montezuma condemns the lovers to death. In a scene set at dawn in a cavern, all gather by the sacrificial stone, but before the execution can proceed Cortez and his priests appear, and the lovers are set free.

== Roles ==
- A Spanish Priest
- Azora, the Daughter of Montezuma (soprano)
- Canek, High Priest of the Sun (bass)
- Hernando Cortez, Conqueror of Mexico
- Montezuma II, Emperor of Mexico (bass)
- Ramatzin, General of Montezuma's Army (baritone)
- Papantzin, Sister of Montezuma (contralto)
- Piqui-Chaqui (Flea-footed), A Runner
- Xalca, A Tlascalan Prince (tenor)

== Performance history ==
The Chicago Opera Association gave the work its world premiere in Chicago, Illinois, on December 26, 1917, and performed it once more in Chicago shortly thereafter.

As a single performance during an out-of-town residency that opened with the New York premiere of Mascagni's Isabeau, the Chicago company gave Azora its New York premiere on January 26, 1918, at the Lexington Opera House. The composer conducted, and the cast included Anna Fitziu as Azora, Forrest Lamont as Xalca, Cyrena van Gordon as Papantzin, Arthur Middleton as Ramatzin, Frank Preisch as Canek, and James Goddard as Montezuma. Although all members of the cast were promoted as young American singers, Lamont, who admittedly first trained and would make most of his career in the United States, was actually of Canadian birth. There were further performances given the same season in Boston and St. Louis.

The New York Times offered mostly praise for the "fresh, young, powerful voices" of the cast; only Goddard was "out of voice," and even he received high marks for his dramatic presentation. The paper's assessment of the work itself, however, although on balance favorable, was not unmixed: "...[W]hile [the] opera lacks somewhat the routine of the theater, and still more the dramatic note, it nevertheless escapes being either mere scholar's music or unsingable." The Times singled out for praise "a fine barbaric dance in the first act," the heroine's aria "Now Fades the Opal Sky" in Act 2, and some ensembles but suggested that more than one segment of the score somewhat outstayed its welcome. The paper also faulted the work for setting the execution in a cave: "The opera should have ended in the open, for the Aztecs worshipped on plateaus, on the pyramid of Cholula, for example, and not in caves." Nonetheless, it deemed the setting appropriately atmospheric for the drama's purposes.

After the performance, both Hadley and Stevens appeared for curtain calls. Fitziu presented Hadley with a large silk American flag, and the "representative audience of New York musicians and society folk" joined in singing as the orchestra played "The Star-Spangled Banner".
