= Cyrena van Gordon =

American opera singer

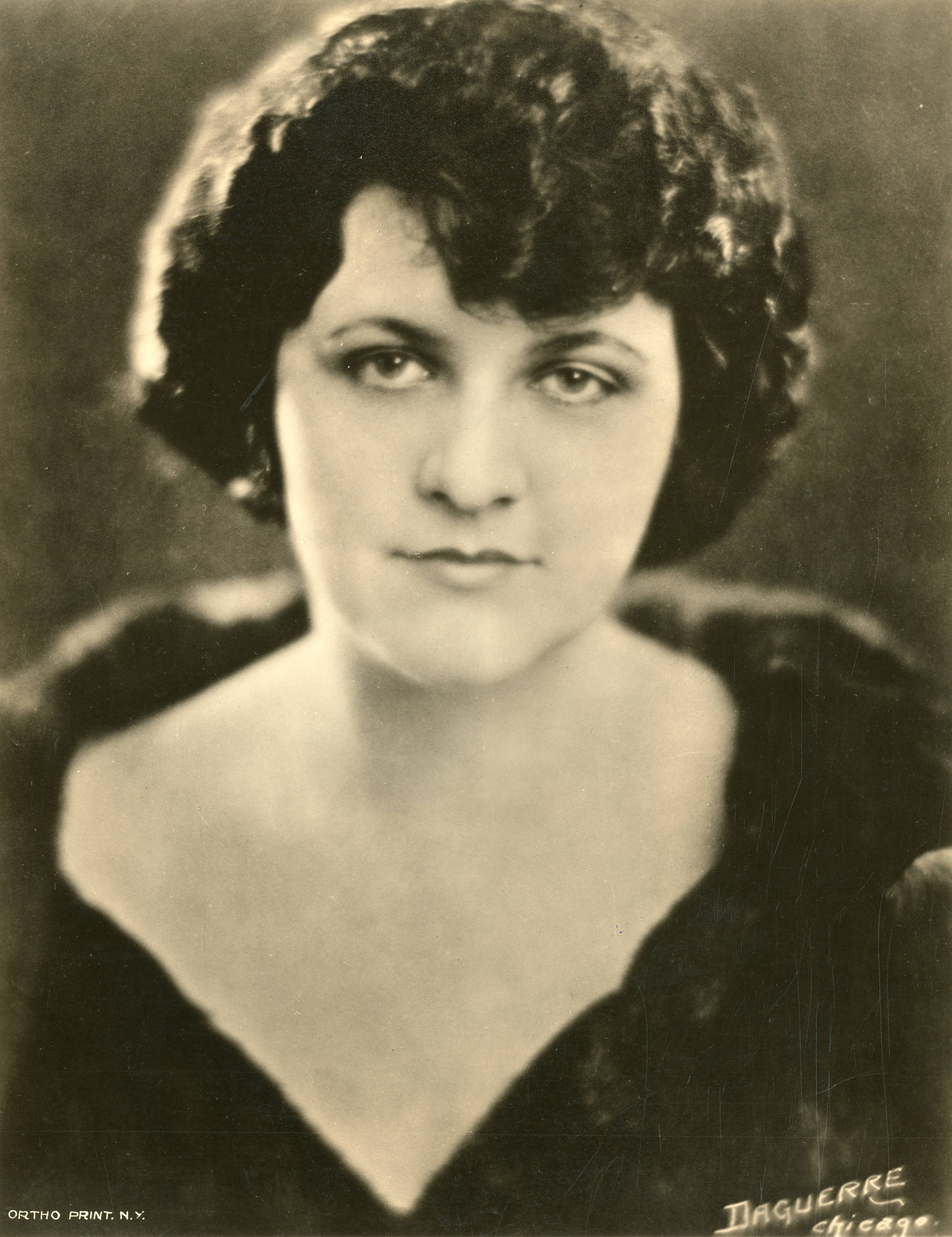
Cyrena van Gordon, 1929

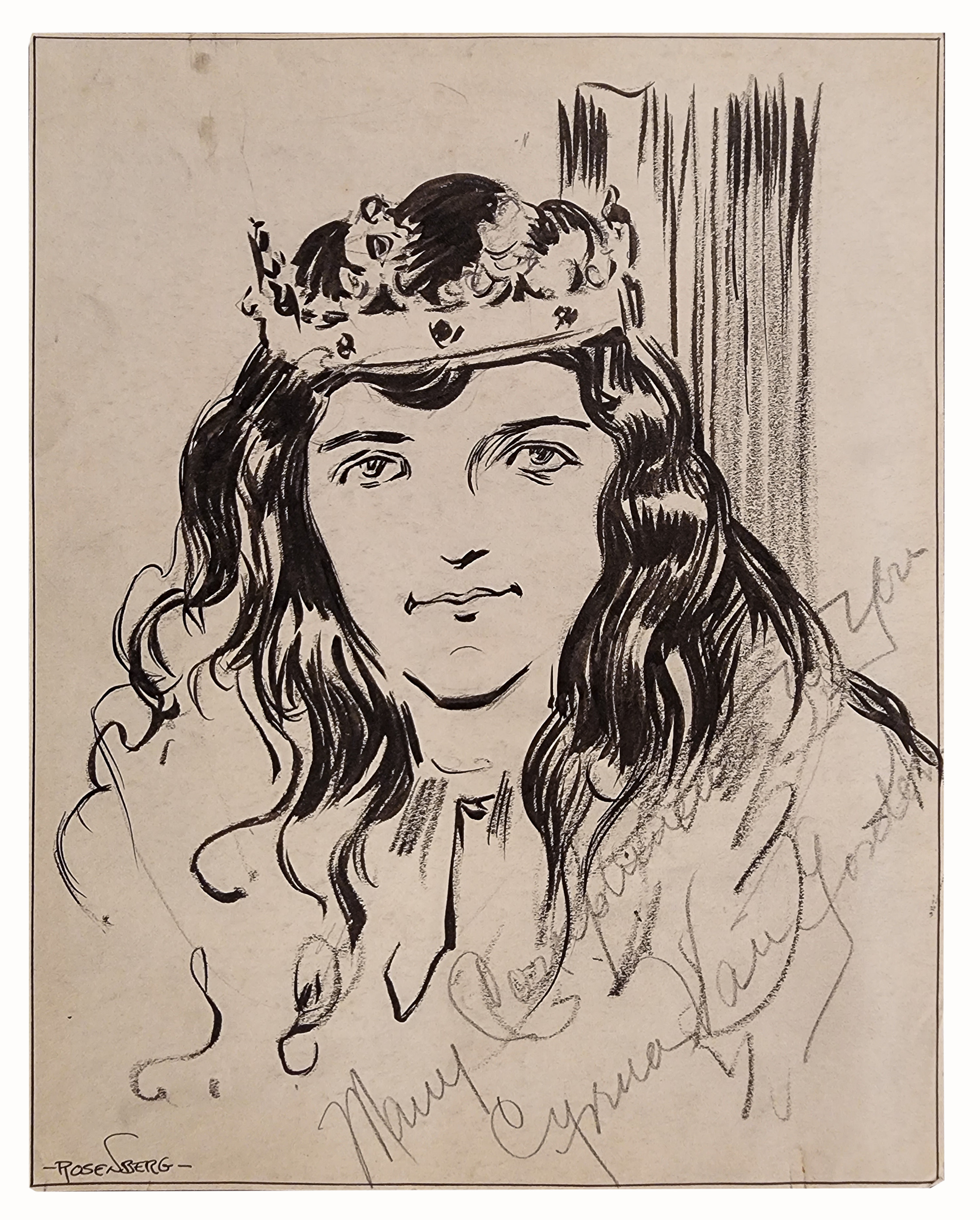
Signed drawing by Manuel Rosenberg 1926

Cyrena van Gordon was the stage name of an American operatic contralto born Cyrena Sue Pocock on September 4, 1892, in Camden, Ohio; she died on April 4, 1964, in New York City. In 1912 she married Shirley B. Munns, an eye, ear, nose, and throat specialist in Chicago.

After studies with Louise Dotti, van Gordon made her operatic debut as Amneris in Verdi's Aida in 1913. A principal member of the opera companies active in Chicago during her career, she also performed in New York City, Philadelphia, and as far afield as San Francisco. She left recordings for the Edison and Columbia companies.

Notable events in her career include the following:

- December 26, 1917, created the role of Papantzin in Henry Kimball Hadley's short-lived opera Azora, the Daughter of Montezuma.
- October 5, 1919, first New York recital, Aeolian Hall. Her program included Handel's Come, Beloved; Carey's Pastoral; songs in English by Salter, Gretchaninov, Sturani, Kramer, Hadley, and Spross; an air by Henry Bishop; and a French air by Lenormand.
- February 8, 1922, appeared as Venus, opposite the Elisabeth of Rosa Raisa, in the first production in German of Wagner's Tannhäuser at New York's Manhattan Opera House; the work had been heard there in French a dozen years before. The New York Times praised her voice as being "of genuine beauty, just as in stature she looked the goddess queen."
- July 12, 1922, performed the first in a series of six operatic concerts sponsored by Wrigley Field in Chicago. She sang on a platform built over the baseball diamond illuminated by electric lighting; the conductor stood over the pitcher's mound.
- May 27, 1933, sang "The Star-Spangled Banner" at the opening ceremonies of the Century of Progress 1933 World's Fair in Chicago.
- November, 1933, appeared as Delilah in Saint-Saëns's Samson and Delilah in San Francisco. Time magazine reported that she received ten curtain calls after singing "Mon cœur s'ouvre à ta voix"; it also remarked that she "was bigger than Samson [tenor Giovanni Martinelli]"
- March, 1935, appeared as Clytemnestra in the United States premiere of Gluck's Iphigénie en Aulide, Philadelphia.
