= John Quincy Adams (painter) =

Austrian painter

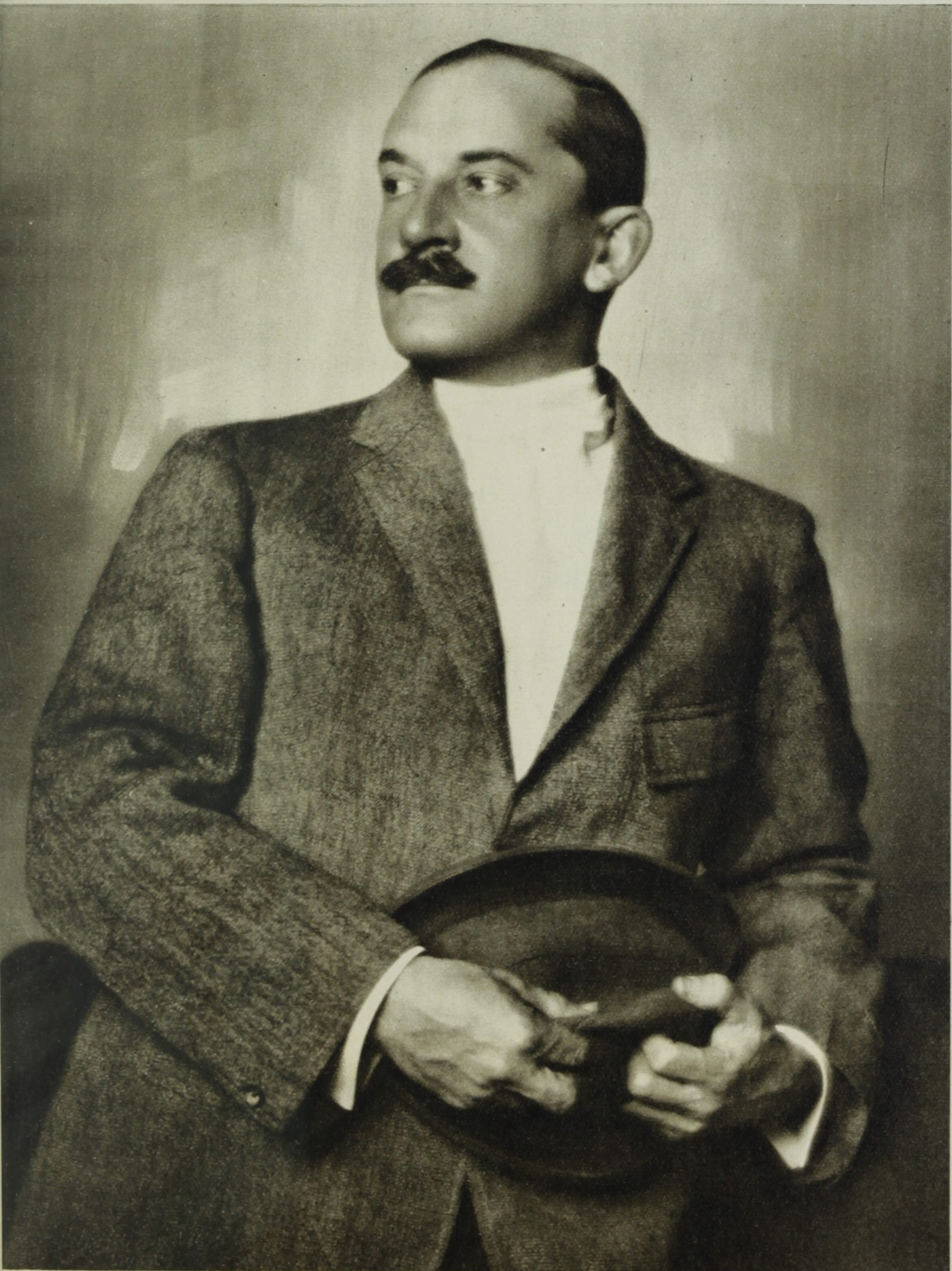
- Photograph of Adams by Edith Barakovich, c. 1930
- Born: 23 December 1873; Vienna, Austria
- Died: 15 March 1933 (aged 59); Vienna, Austria
- Education: Academy of Fine Arts, Vienna; Académie Julian
- Children: Harriet Walderdorff
- Parent: Charles R. Adams

John Quincy Adams (23 December 1873 – 15 March 1933) was an Austrian genre and portrait painter of American ancestry.

== Early life ==
Adams was born in Vienna on 23 December 1873. His mother was Nina Bleyer and his father was the American opera singer, Charles R. Adams, who performed at the Vienna State Opera from 1867 to 1877. From 1878 to 1890, he lived with his parents in the United States and was being prepared for a career in banking.

In 1891, he became one of the first students to attend a private art school operated by Robert Scheffer. After two years, he enrolled at the Academy of Fine Arts, Vienna, where he studied with Siegmund L'Allemand and August Eisenmenger. This was followed by time in Munich, studying with Carl von Marr and Johann Caspar Herterich. He completed his studies in Paris at the Académie Julian with Jules Laurens and Jean-Joseph Benjamin-Constant. Despite this variety of instructors, the expatriate American painter, James McNeill Whistler, appears to have had the most influence on his style.

== Career ==
In 1903, he became a member of the Vienna Künstlerhaus and began to exhibit there on a regular basis. A minor scandal was created in 1909, when he displayed a group portrait with Dr. Ernst Wertheim performing gynecological surgery. During World War I, he was a member of the k.u.k. Kriegspressequartier (war press bureau) and painted on the Russian, Italian, Serbian and Albanian battle fronts. Many works from this period are on display at the Museum of Military History, Vienna. He usually spent his summers at Sankt Gilgen, where he had assembled a pre-cast wooden house from Sweden. It is likely that he associated with the artists at the nearby Zinkenbacher Art Colony.

From 1917 to 1931, he often visited the United States and had several successful showings there. From 1930 to 1931, he painted a series of portraits for Yale University. In 1933, he was preparing to attend an exhibition in Pittsburgh, sponsored by the Carnegie Institute, when he fell ill and died at the Auersperg Sanatorium. He was buried at the Vienna Central Cemetery. His works may be seen at the Österreichische Galerie Belvedere and the Vienna Museum, among others.

== Personal life ==
Adams died on 15 March 1933 at the Auersperg Sanatorium in Vienna.

His daughter, Harriet Walderdorff, became a well known hotelier in Salzburg and, in 1963, was elected President of the Austrian Hotel Association. In 1986, she organized a major retrospective of his portraits at the Academy.

== Gallery ==
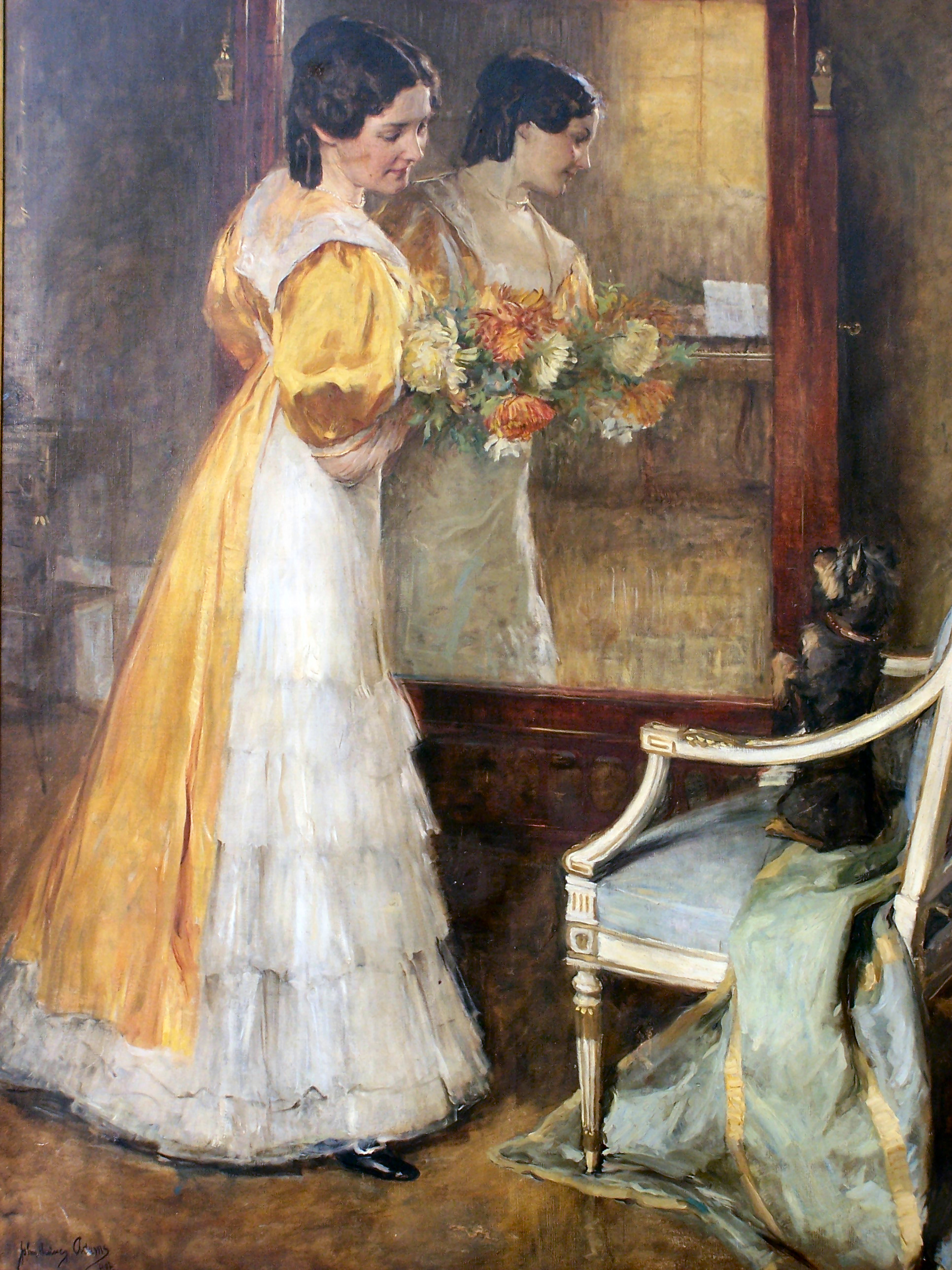
Maria Teresa von Moser-Ebreichsdorf (1872–1940)

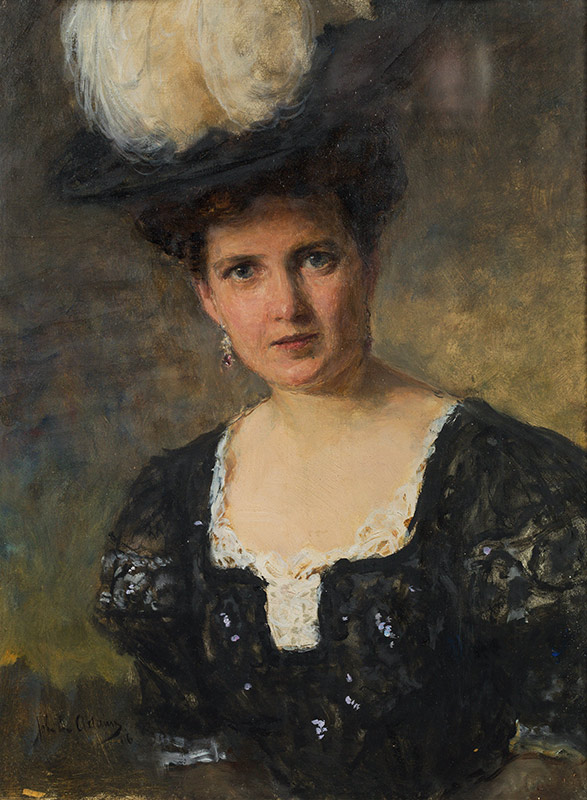
Countess Gisela Kinsky von Wchinitz und Tettau (1876–1939)

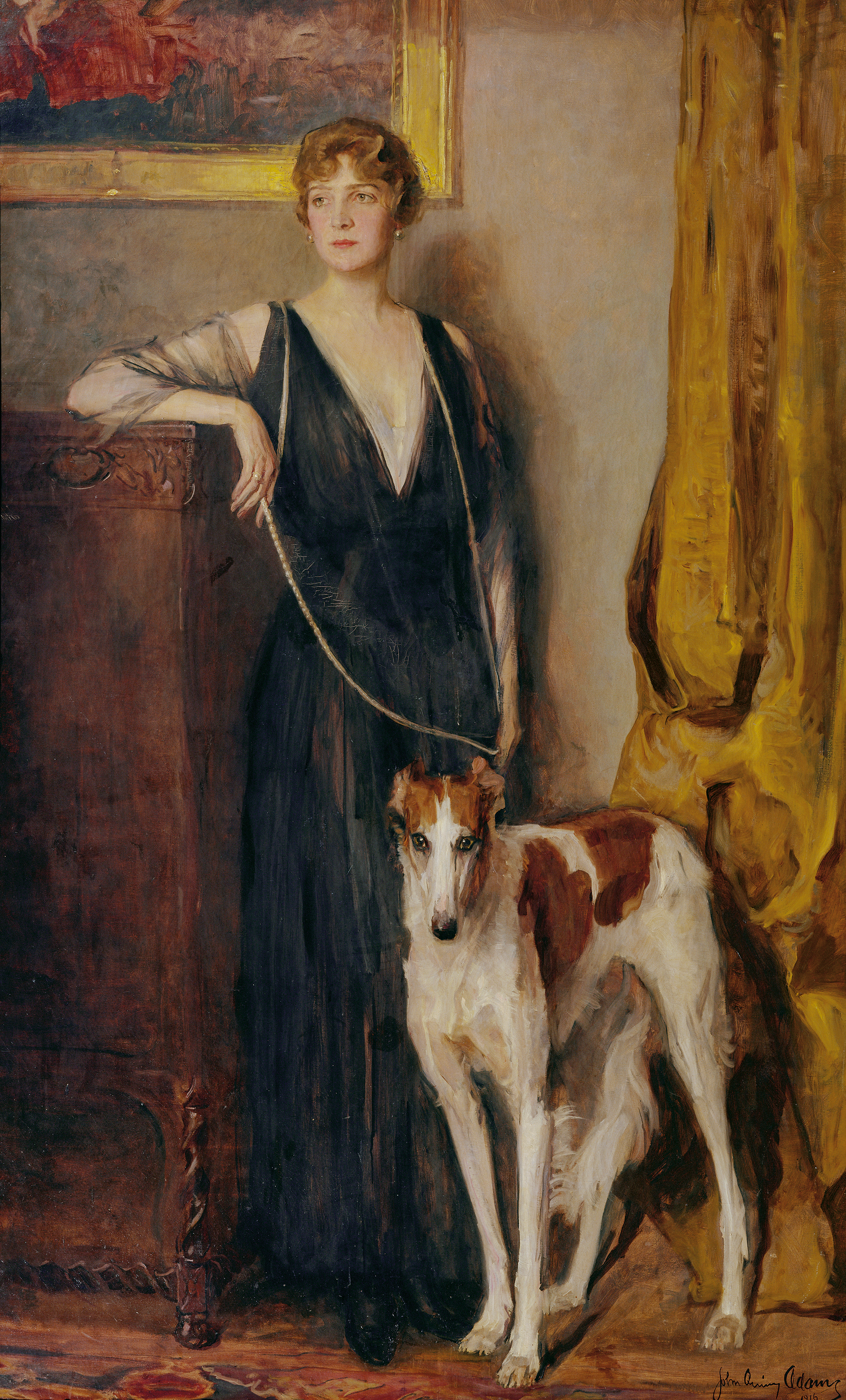
Kitty, Baroness von Rothschild

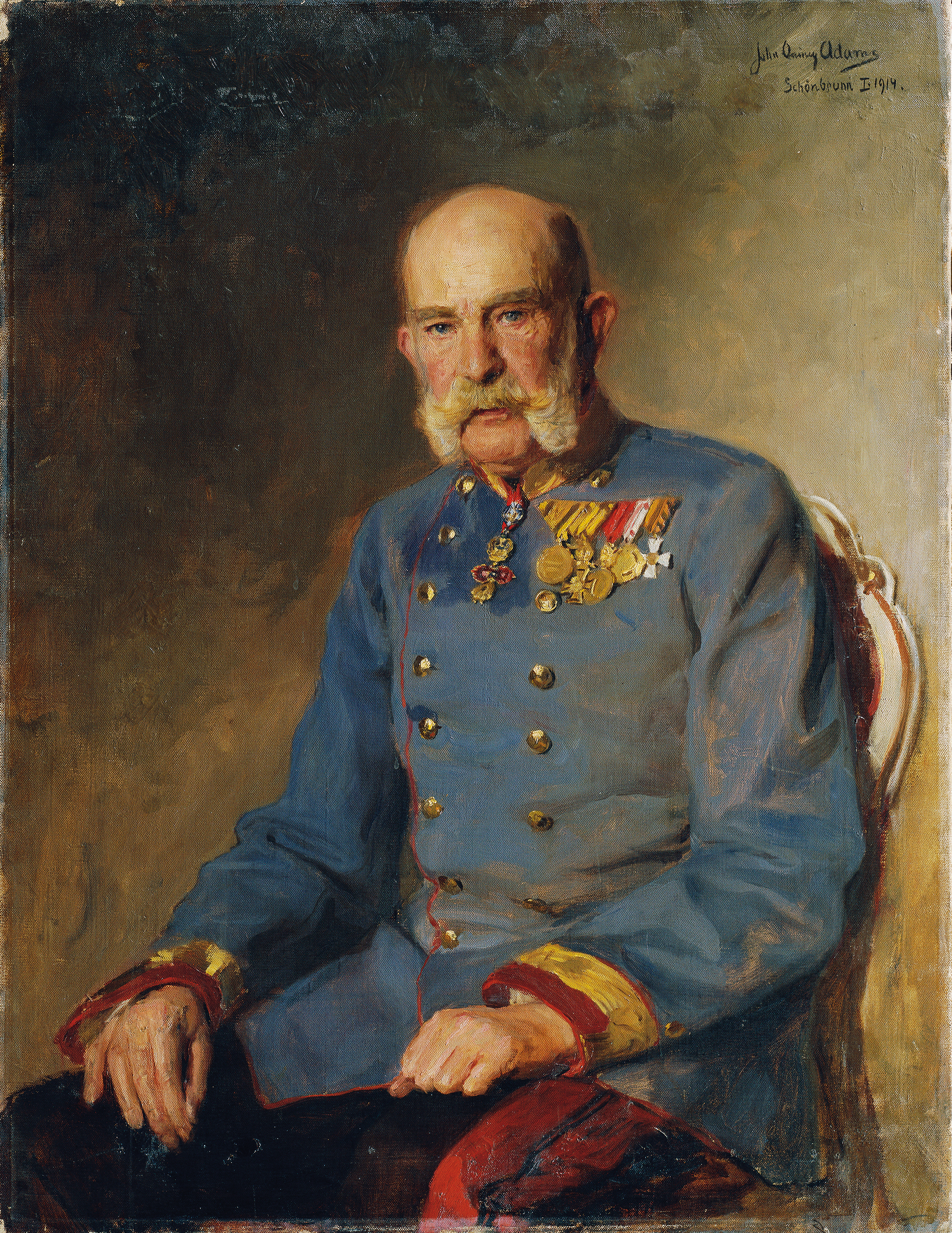
Emperor Franz Joseph I

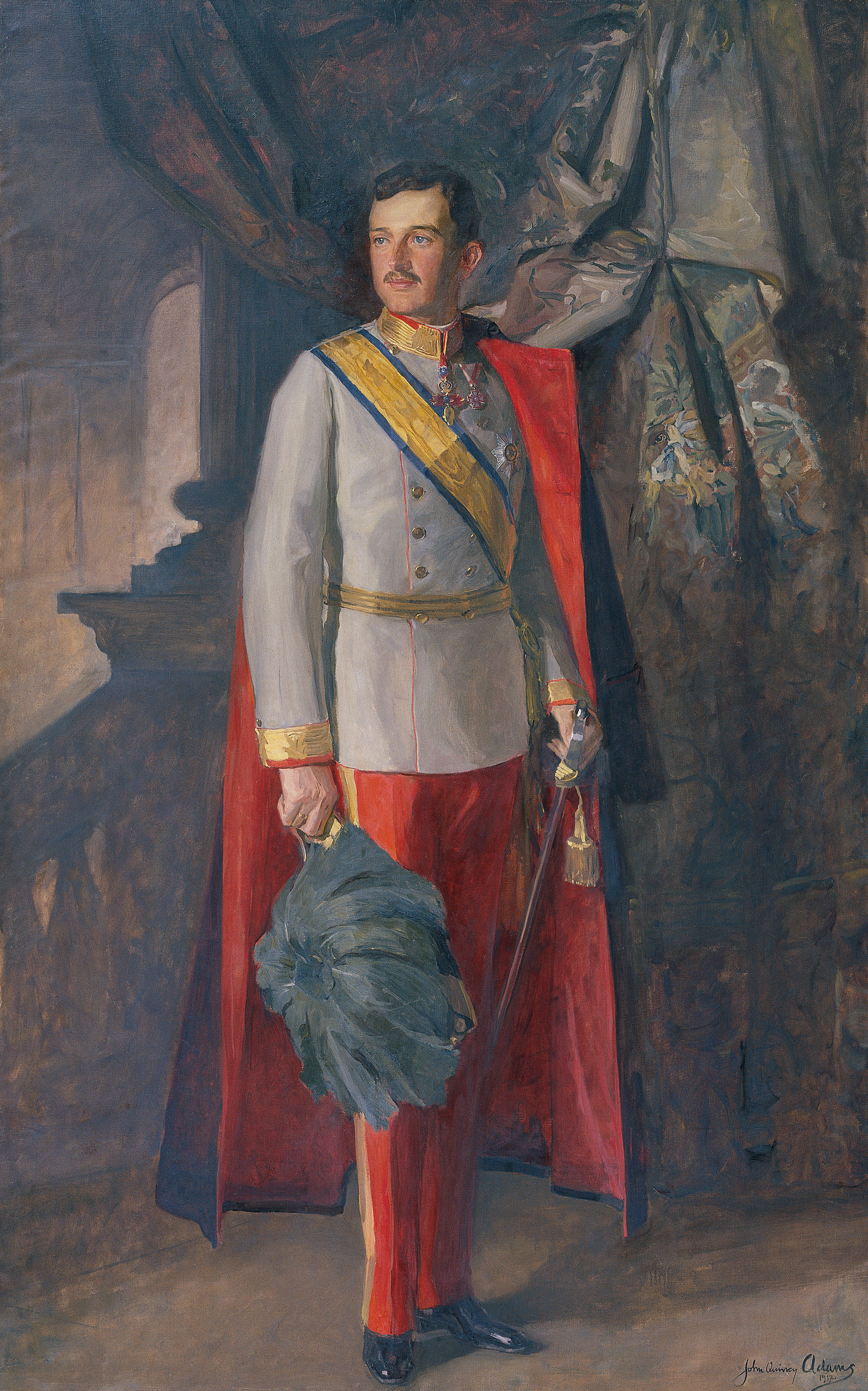
Emperor Charles I of Austria

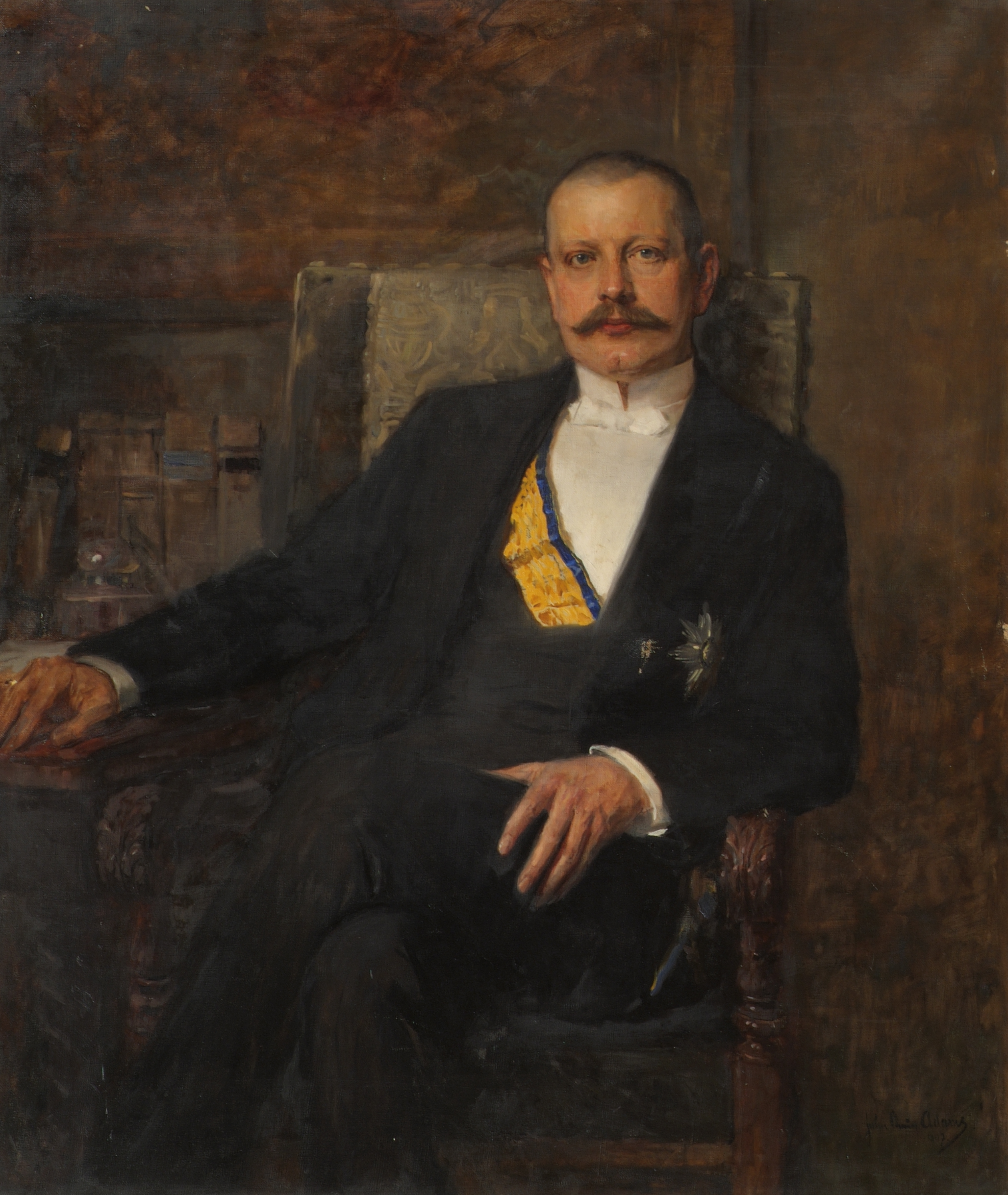
Richard, Count Bienerth-Schmerling

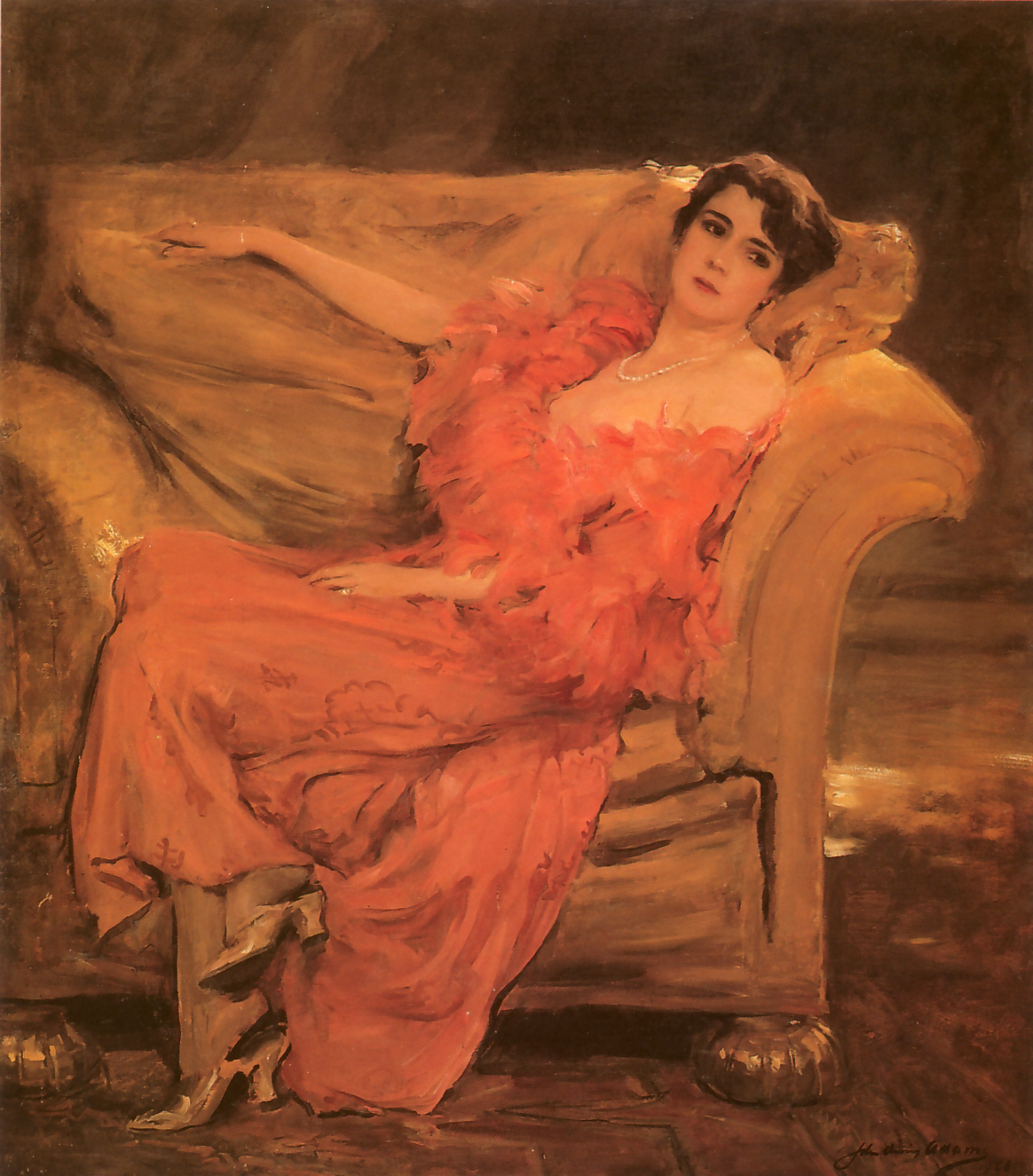
Luise Eisner, Princess Odescalchi
