= Anton Peschka =

Austrian painter (1885–1940)

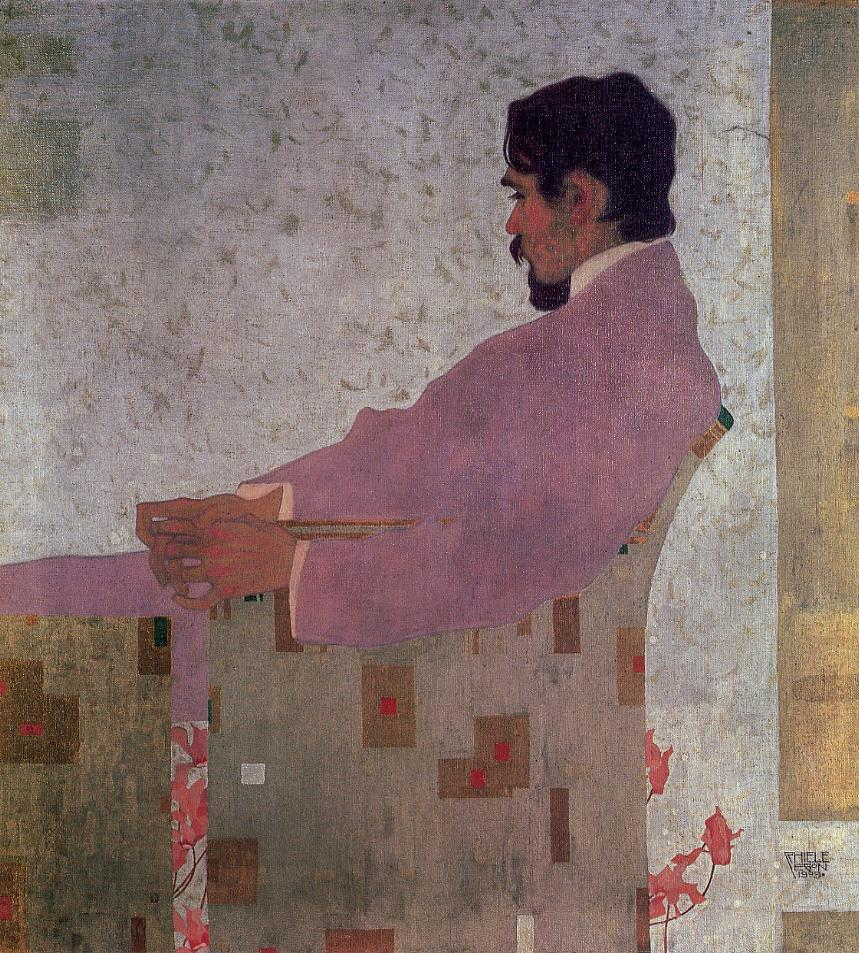
Portrait of Anton Peschka by Egon Schiele (1909)

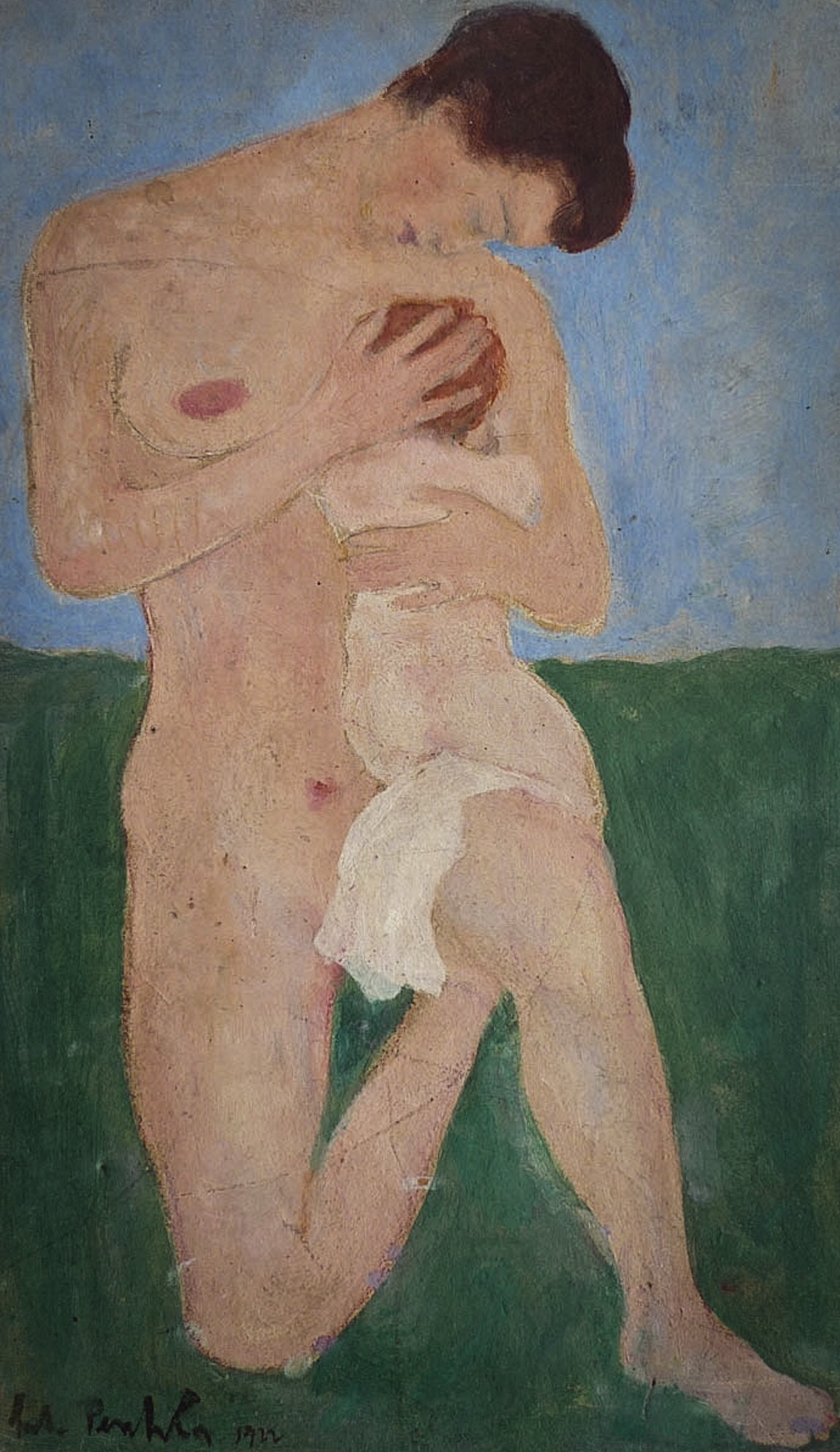
Anton Peschka: mother with child (1922)

Anton Emanuel Peschka (21 February 1885, Vienna - 9 September 1940, Vienna) was an Austrian painter.

== Biography ==
After receiving a commercial education, he took his first art lessons with Robert Scheffer. He then studied at the Academy of Fine Arts, Vienna, with Christian Griepenkerl. He befriended his fellow student, Egon Schiele, and, in 1914, married Schiele's sister, Gertrude.

He exhibited at the Vienna Künstlerhaus from 1910 to 1919 and, from 1922 to 1935, was a member of the Hagenbund. He won a competition for designing stamps in 1921 and another for designing banknotes in 1925.

In 1923, Fritz Karpfen wrote enthusiastically about Peschka in his overview of Austrian art: “His paintings are penetrating, blasting through conventional shapes while happily constructing a new exposition... You feel that this is an artist able to achieve something great, who has within him the means to do this.”

He specialized in nudes and landscapes, both heavily influenced by his brother-in-law's work. His paintings may be seen in the Albertina and the Vienna Museum. A street in the Viennese district of Hietzing has been named after him.

His son, Anton (1914–1997), also became a painter.

Today, his works can be seen in: Belvedere, Vienna Albertina, Vienna Kupferstichkabinett of the City of Vienna The Vienna Museum Military History Museum, Vienna
