= Alice Wanke =

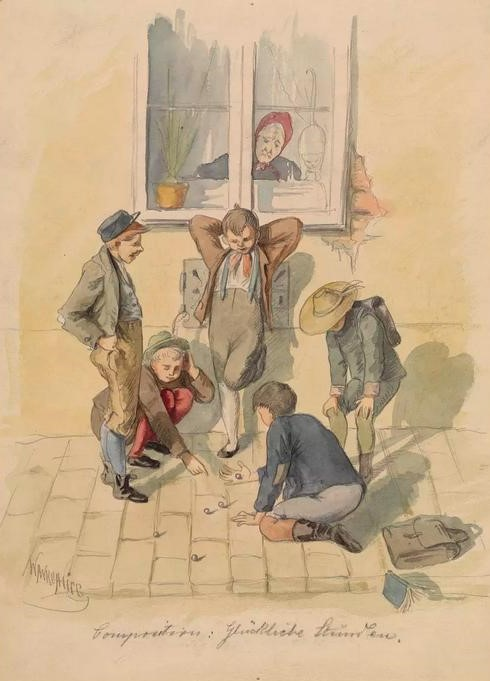
Glückliche Stündchen (Happy Hour), watercolour c. 1900

Alice Wanke (11 April 1873 – 13 November 1939) was an Austrian painter, graphic artist, and illustrator.

== Early life ==
Born in Vienna, Wanke was a daughter of Ludwig Wanke, a landscape and genre painter who died in 1885. After her elementary school, she was educated at the art school of Robert Scheffer, then from 1894 to 1900 at the Vienna School of Applied Arts under Felician Myrbach, Josef Hoffmann, and Eduard Leisching. In 1900, she exhibited portraits at the Association of Austrian Visual Artists in Innsbruck. She was a student in the painting class of Franz von Matsch and in 1911–1912 in the textile workshop of Rosalia Rothansl.

== Career ==
From 1901 to 1911, Wanke worked as a commercial artist for the Charles Cabos company, which supplied biscuits, cakes, and teas to the Imperial and Royal court of Franz Joseph I. From the early 20th century, she designed caricature-style postcards in the style of the Vienna Secession for the art publisher Theodor Stroefer in Nuremberg, the Viennese firm of M. Munk, and Kohn brothers. These were featured in an exhibition at the Academy of Fine Arts Vienna in 2017.

In 1908, Wanke designed figurative murals for the night café at the Apollo Theatre in Vienna. In 1910, she created murals for a reception room of the Arts and Crafts Pavilion at the International Hunting Exhibition in Vienna, and also ceramics depicting the Stations of the Cross and a tabernacle painting for the exhibition’s chapel. In 1912, she designed lunettes for a Vienna restaurant called "Tabakspfeife". After a short career at the Vienna Porcelain Manufactory Augarten, during the First World War she taught drawing, painting, and handicrafts at the Margareten high school for girls. After that, she worked on her own account.

As an artist, Wanke designed posters, advertisements, trademarks, and badges, and illustrated books. As a print-maker, she worked in etchings, woodcuts, and linocuts. She wrote as well as illustrating Die Geschichte vom schmutzigen Peter (undated, c. 1910) and often worked for the Viennese children's newspaper Meine erste Zeitung. Her book illustrations were seen at the International Exhibition for Book Trade and Graphic Arts of 1914 in Leipzig. Wanke's work also includes a cover design for the Berlin magazine Die Dame. Jewellery, tableware, vases, lamps, and ornaments she designed have survived.

Works by Alice Wanke are in the Vienna Museum, the University of Applied Arts Vienna, the Austrian National Library, the Academy of Fine Arts Vienna, and the Museum of Applied Arts, Vienna.

== Selected awards ==
- Design Prize at the Exposition Universelle, Paris, 1900
- Honourable Mention for a public libraries bookplate design in the Berlin Ex-Libris Society's Competition, 1903
- Silver Medal, International Exhibition of Arts and Crafts, St. Petersburg, 1908
- First Prize for Poster Design, International Hunting Exhibition, Vienna, 1910
