= Carl Haunold =

Austrian painter

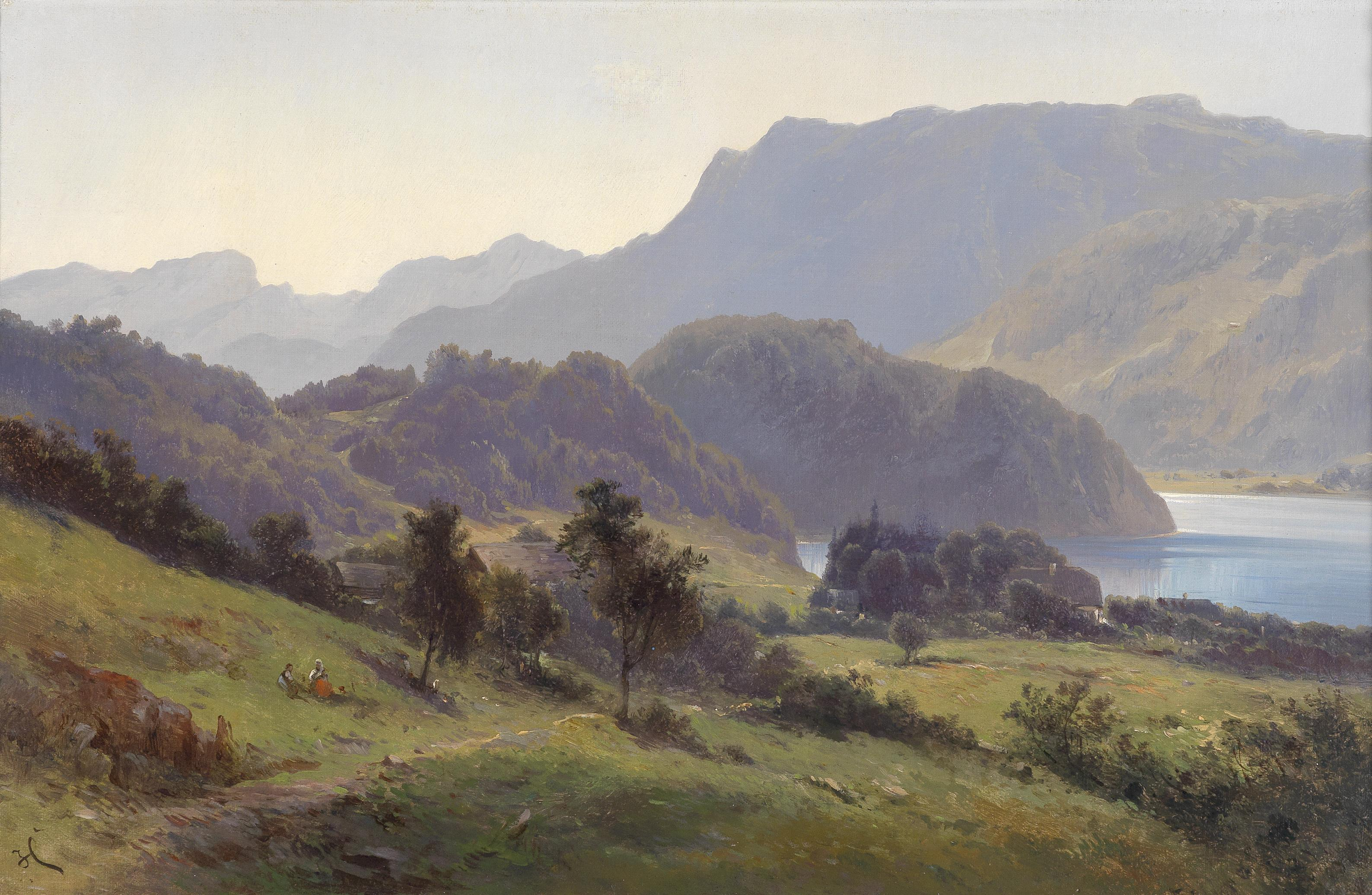
Party by the Wolfgangsee

Carl Franz Emanuel Haunold (29 March 1832 – 7 July 1911) was an Austrian landscape painter and librettist.

== Biography ==
Haunold was born on 29 March 1832 in Vienna. In 1846, he enrolled at the Academy of Fine Arts, Vienna, where he studied with Franz Steinfeld and Johann Ender. His studies were interrupted by the Revolution of 1848 so, in 1854, to supplement his training, he became a student of Anton Hansch.

From the beginning, he specialized in landscape painting. His first showing came in 1856, with the local Artists' Association, where he displayed "A Party in Heiligenblut" He later undertook several study trips to Italy, Hungary and Germany.

In 1861, he was one of the co-founding members of The Society of Fine Arts of Vienna. In 1873, he was able to exhibit two paintings at the Vienna World's Fair. He resigned from the Society in 1879, when one of his paintings was rejected for an exhibition.

He became a teacher at the painting school operated by Robert Scheffer in 1891.

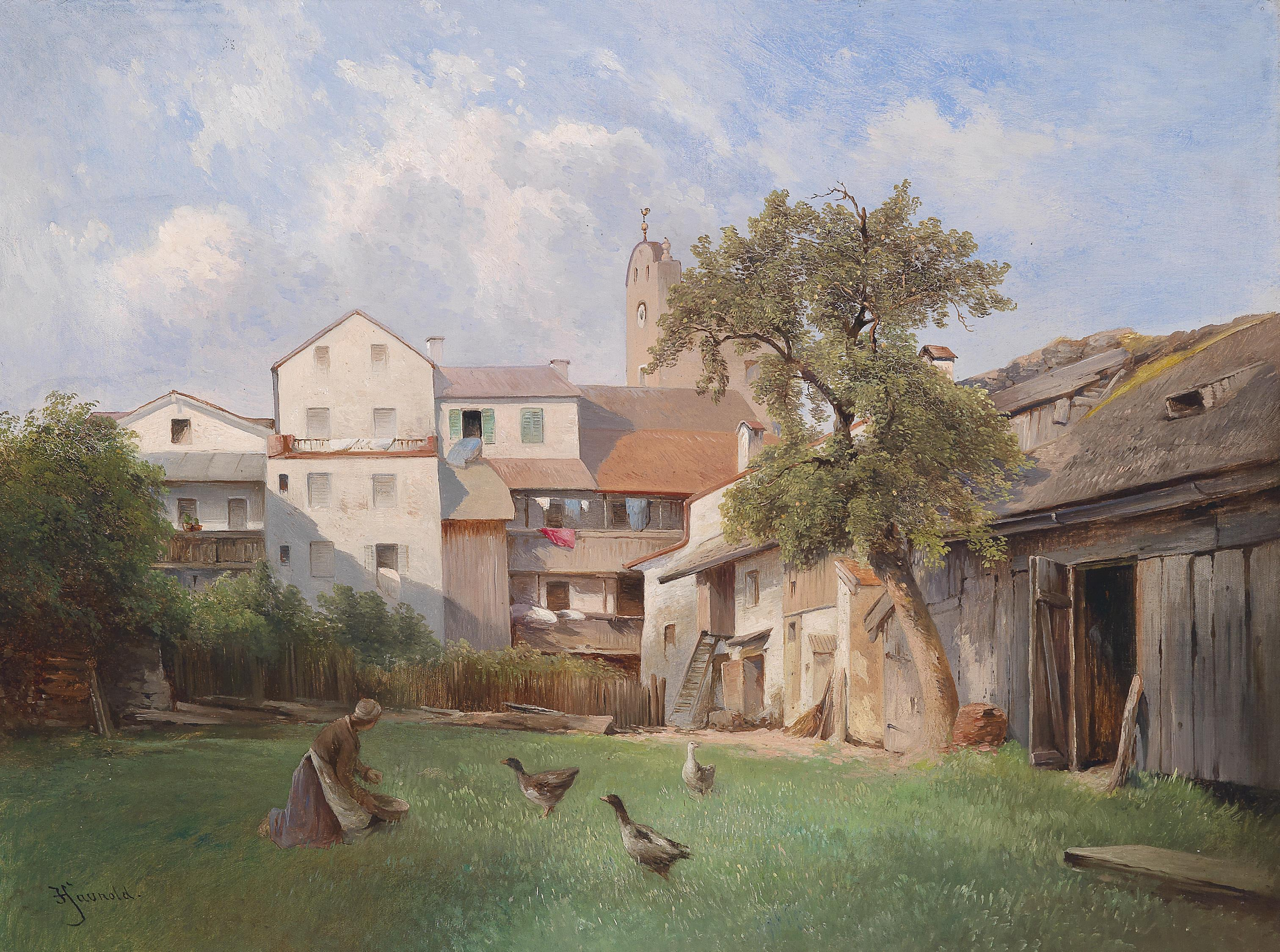
Courtyard of a Soapmaker's House, Tittmoning

In addition to his landscapes, he created humorous singspiels for the annual "Fool's Evening" of the Vienna Men's Choral Society and wrote the lyrics for an operetta called "Heinz das Bluthund, oder Das Rosengärtlein von Aggstein", which was performed in 1867.

Haunold died on 7 July 1911 in Vienna.
