= Anton Faistauer =

Austrian artist (1887–1930)

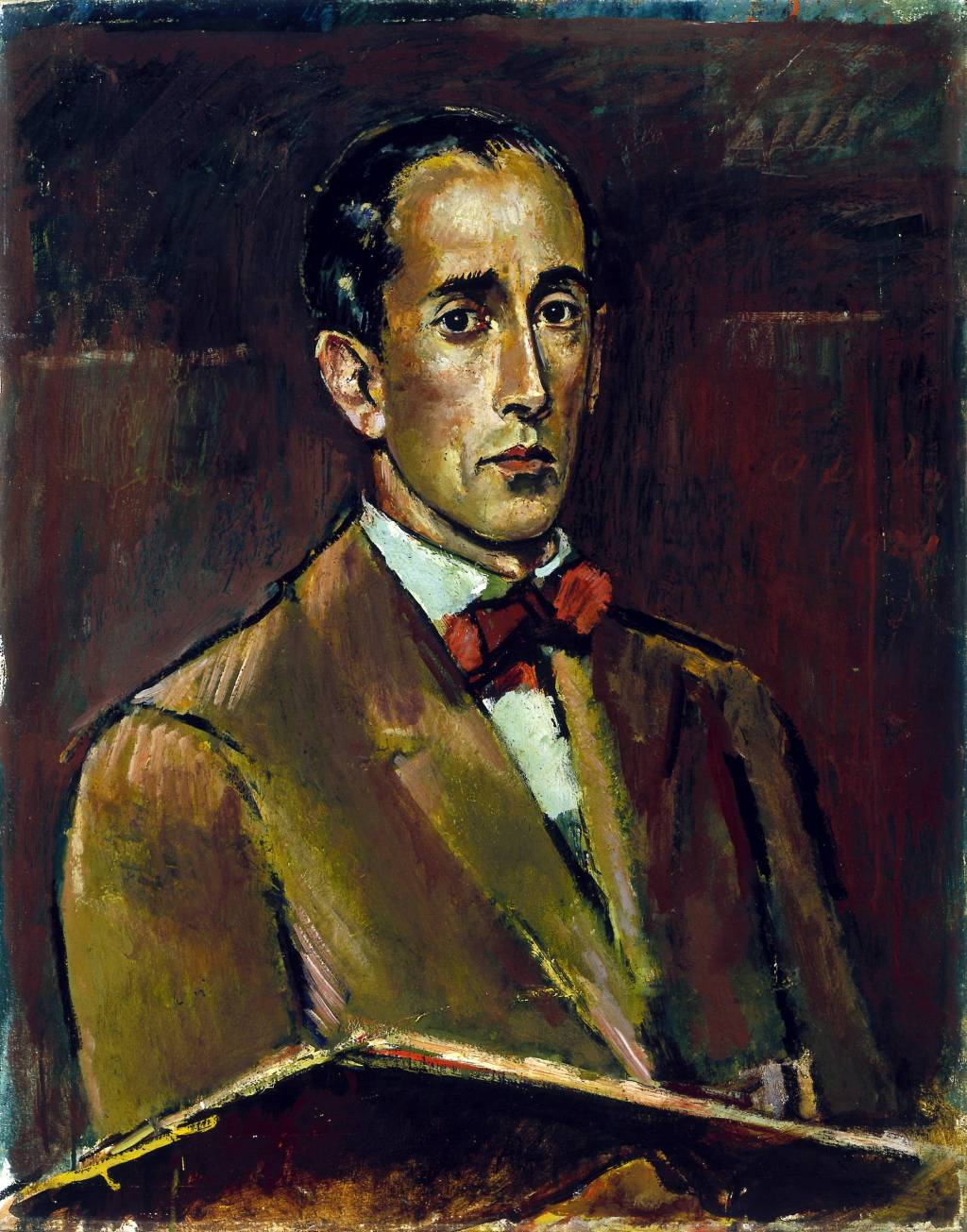
Self-portrait with Palette (c.1920)

Anton Faistauer (14 February 1887, Sankt Martin bei Lofer – 13 February 1930, Vienna) was an Austrian Expressionist painter.

== Life ==
He came from a family of farmers, grew up near Maishofen and originally wanted to be a priest. After a meeting with Albert Paris Gütersloh while he was attending the Gymnasium in Bolzano, however, he became interested in painting. From 1904 to 1906, he attended a private art school operated by Robert Scheffer in Vienna, then transferred to the Academy of Fine Arts where he studied with Alois Delug and Christian Griepenkerl.

In 1909 he resigned from the Academy and, together with Anton Kolig, Robin Christian Andersen, Franz Wiegele and Egon Schiele, became one of the founders of the "Neukunstgruppe", to protest the Academy's conservative attitudes. From 1909 to 1912, he travelled to Ticino, Northern Italy and Berlin and exhibited widely. In 1913, he married Ida Andersen, the sister of his friend Robin. Because of World War I, he moved back to Maishofen in 1915.

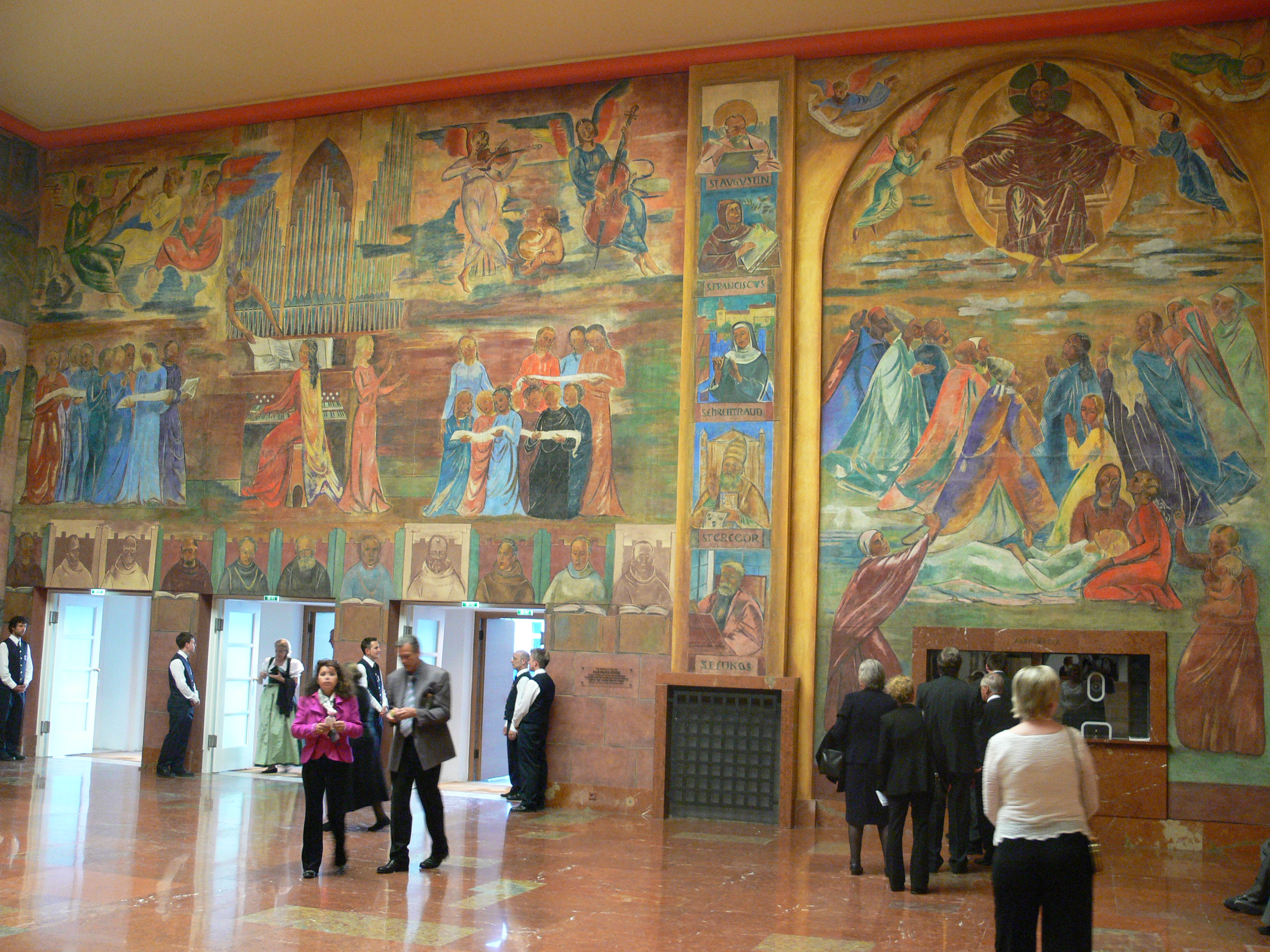
Foyer at the Salzburg Festspielhaus

Nevertheless, he was forced to do military service from 1916 to 1918 with the k.u.k.-Infanterieregiment Nr. 59; although he served unarmed, due to "unsuitability". After July 1917, he was stationed at the Heeresgeschichtliches Museum "for special purposes", where he helped organize war art exhibitions with his old friend Schiele.

=== The post-war period ===
After the war he lived in Salzburg where, with Felix Albrecht Harta and others, he founded another radical art group, "Der Wassermann". His wife died the night before their first exhibition. Two years later, he remarried. By 1925, he was suffering from lung and stomach disorders and made several therapeutic trips to Bolzano.

That same year, he received a major commission to paint frescoes at the new Kleines Festspielhaus in Salzburg. This was followed by similar commissions at the seminary in Bamberg and a castle in the Weidlingau district of Vienna. During this period, his second marriage failed and he lived with his mistress.

In 1926 he was offered a professorship at the Academy, but did not accept. He returned to Vienna in 1927, but continued to travel, especially in Italy. Three years later, he had a stomach hemorrhage and died following surgery. He was buried in Maishofen with a grave memorial designed by Clemens Holzmeister. A street in Salzburg is named after him and the State of Salzburg has awarded an "Anton-Faistauer-Preis" for art since 1972.

== Selected paintings ==
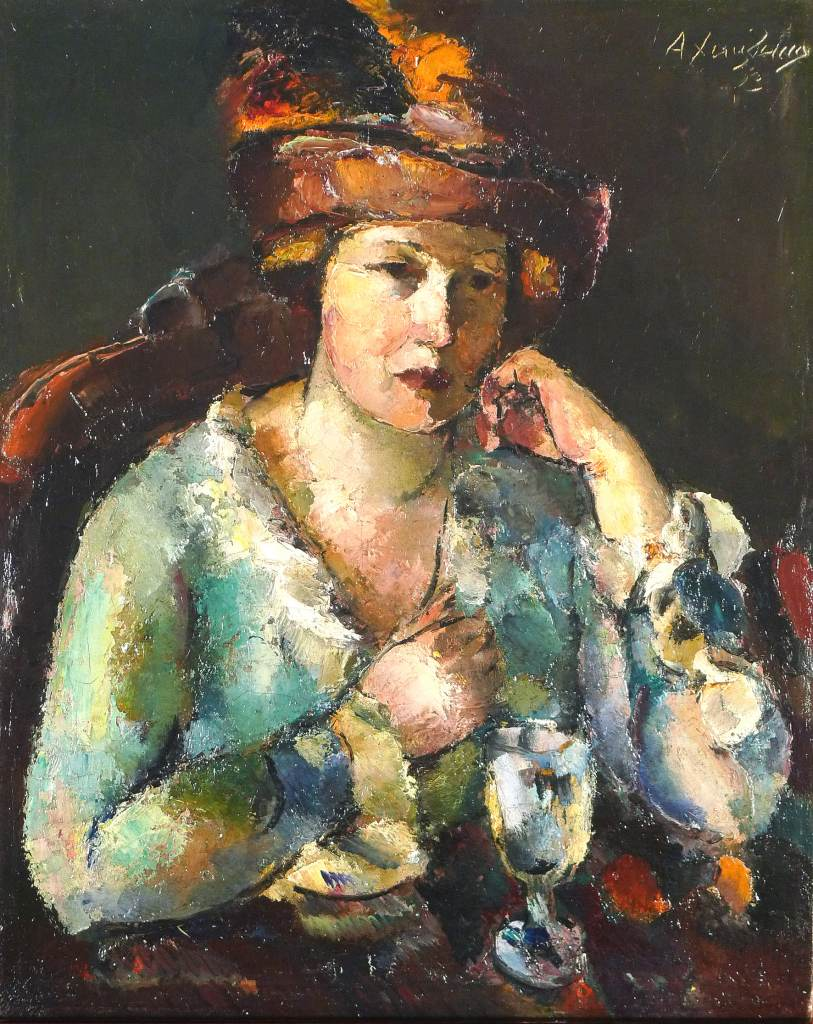
Woman with Wineglass (1913)

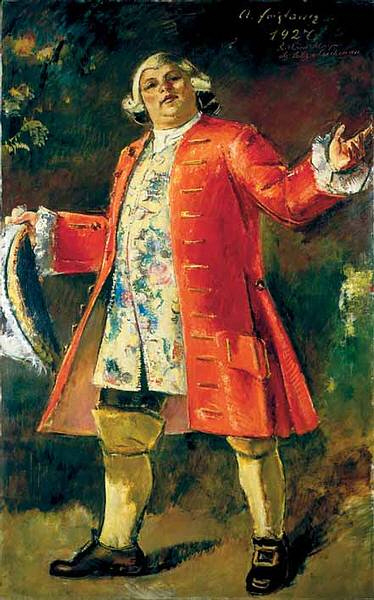
Richard Mayr as
Baron Ochs in Der Rosenkavalier (1927)

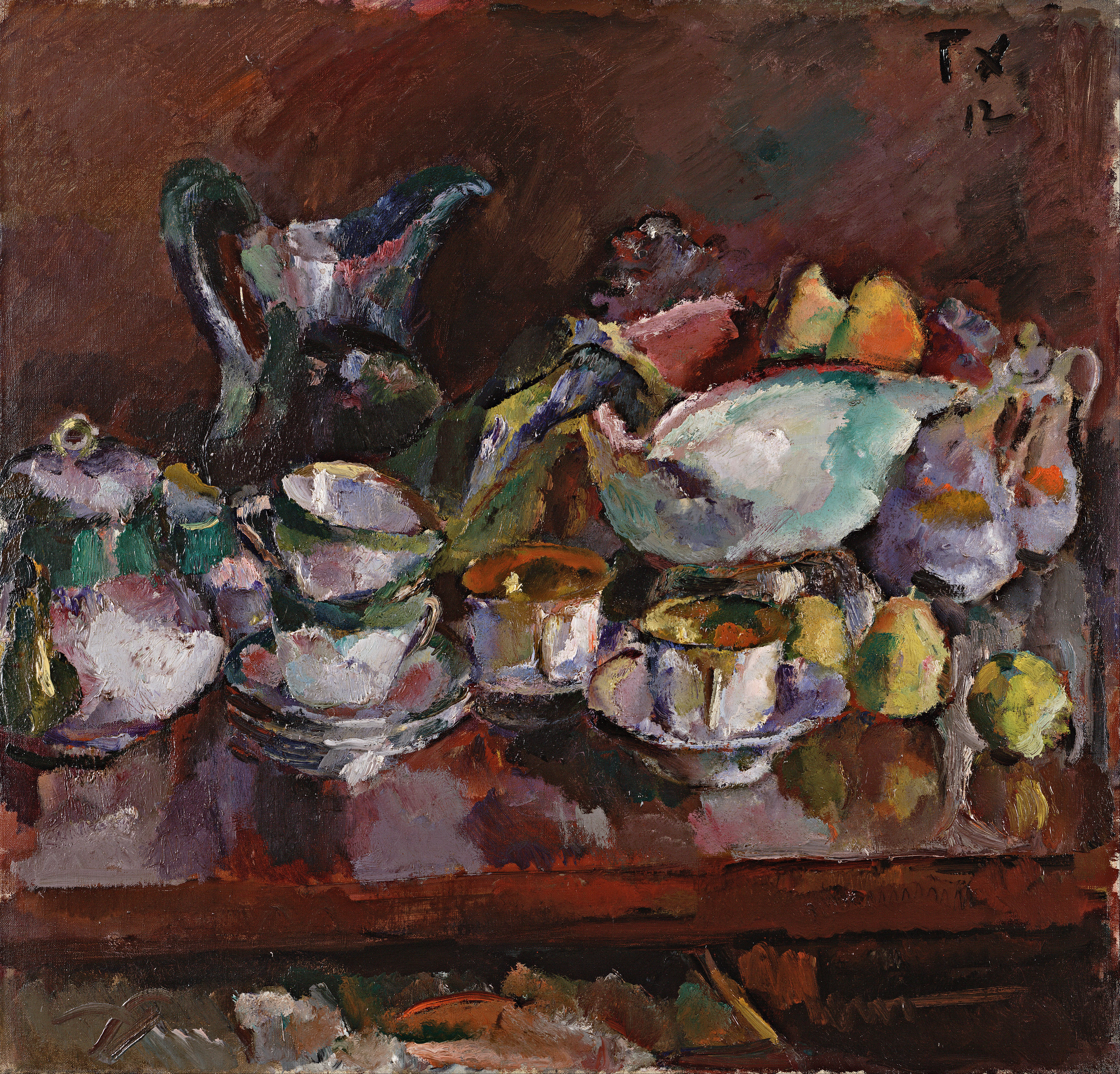
Still-life with Coffee Cups (1912)

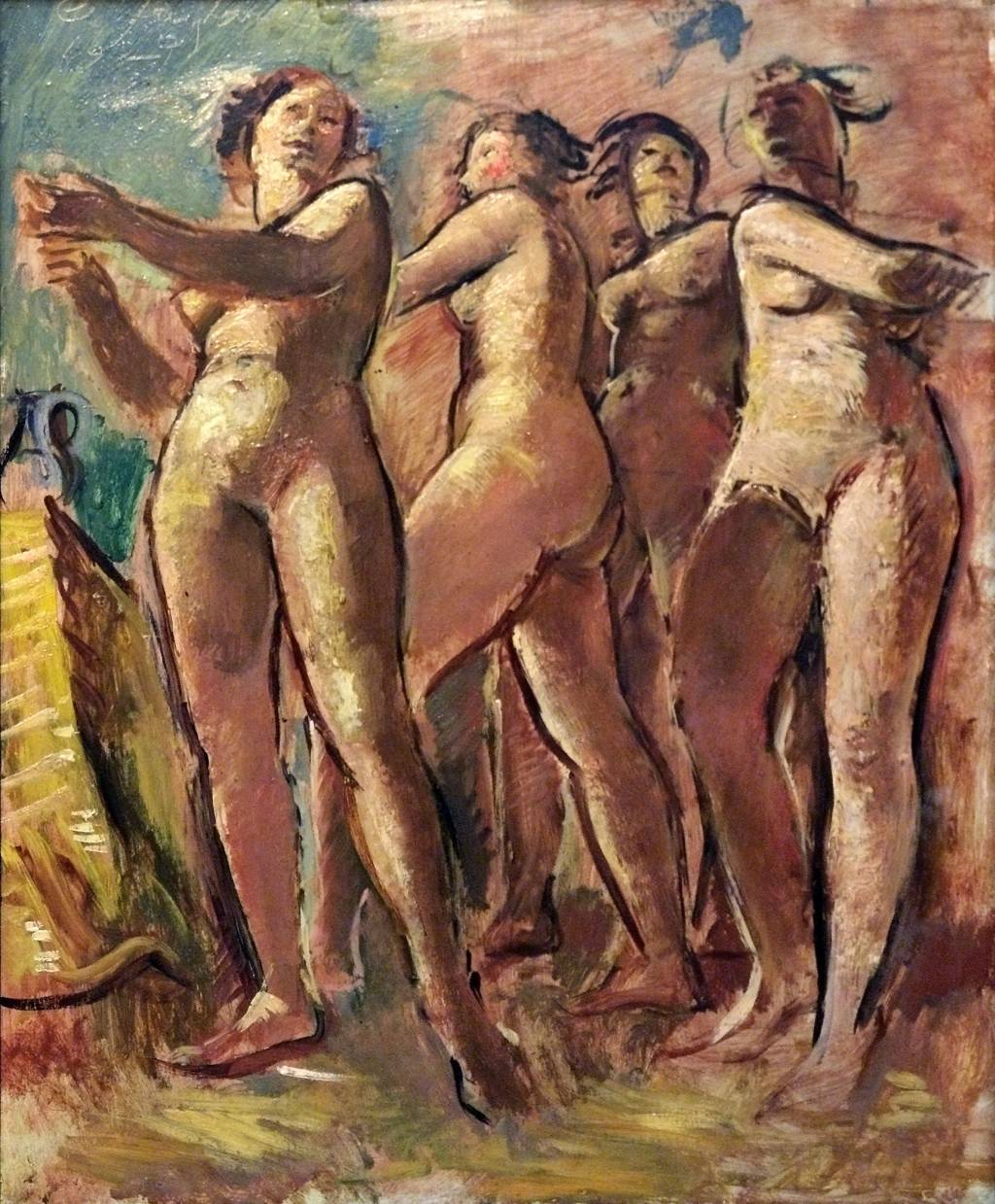
Diana with Three Women (c.1920)

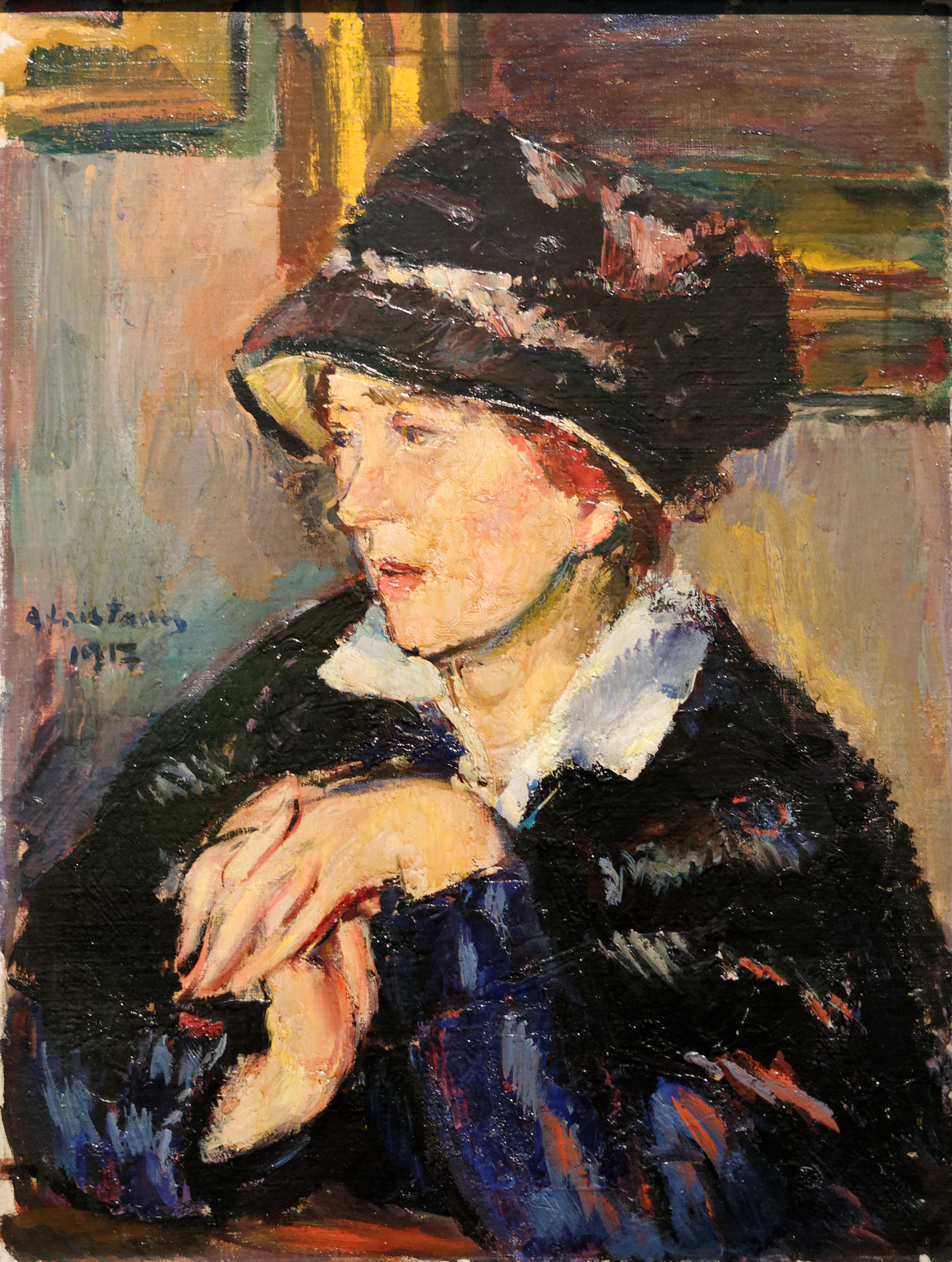
Woman with a Dark Hat (1917)

== Writings ==
- Neue Malerei in Österreich. Betrachtungen eines Malers. Vienna: Amalthea 1923.
