= Charles R. Adams =

American actor

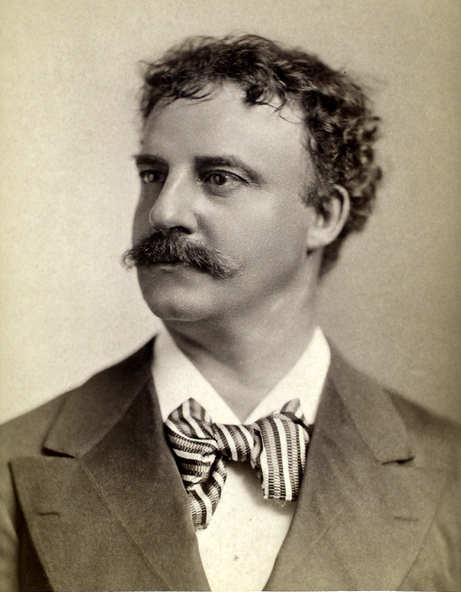
Charles R Adams

Charles R. Adams (February 9, 1834 – July 4, 1900) was an American opera singer and singing instructor. An excellent tenor and fine actor, he had a commanding stage presence and was particularly admired for his interpretations of the works of Richard Wagner. He had a son, the Austrian genre painter John Quincy Adams.

== Biography ==
Adams was born in Charlestown, Massachusetts, in 1834, the son of Charles Adams and Eliza Ann Runey Adams. He studied music in Boston under Edwin Bruce, Mme. Arnault, and R. Mulder. In 1856, he was the tenor soloist in Joseph Haydn's oratorio The Creation, with the Handel and Haydn Society, and went on to tour the United States and the West Indies from 1856 through 1861.

He moved to Vienna where he studied with Carlo Barbieri and sang lead tenor roles at the Vienna Hofoper. They included Elvino in Bellini's La sonnambula. He next went on tour in Russia and the Netherlands before joining the Royal Opera in Berlin. Adams stayed there for three years, before becoming a principal tenor of the Vienna Hofoper from 1867 to 1876. He also sang two seasons at the Royal Opera House in London's Covent Garden, one season at the Royal Palace of Madrid, and one season at La Scala, Milan.

Adams toured America with the Carl Strakosch company in 1877 and 1878, singing among other parts the title role in the first American production of Wagner's Rienzi. He also performed in other German operas with Mme. Poppenheim and in Italian operas with Clara Louise Kellogg, Maria Litta and Annie Louise Cary.

His greatest operatic roles were Manrico in Il trovatore, the title part in Lohengrin, Cola di Rienzo in Rienzi, and the title part in Tannhäuser. In his later life, from 1879 on, he worked as a teacher in Boston. His students included the likes of Arthur Middleton, Grace Hiltz, Nellie Melba, Allie Luse Dick, and Emma Eames, the latter being his most celebrated pupil. He died in West Harwich, on Cape Cod, in 1900.

== Gallery ==
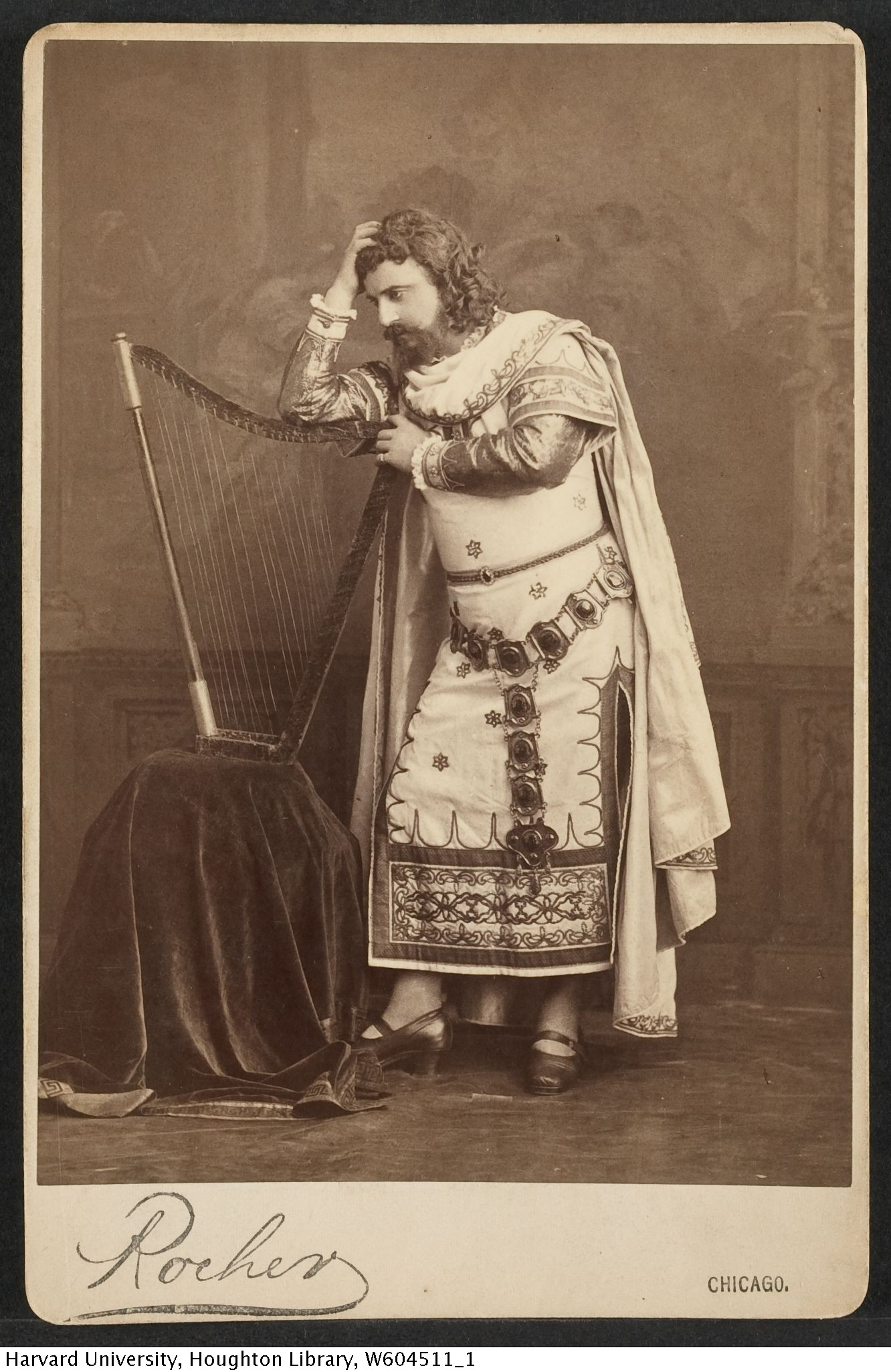

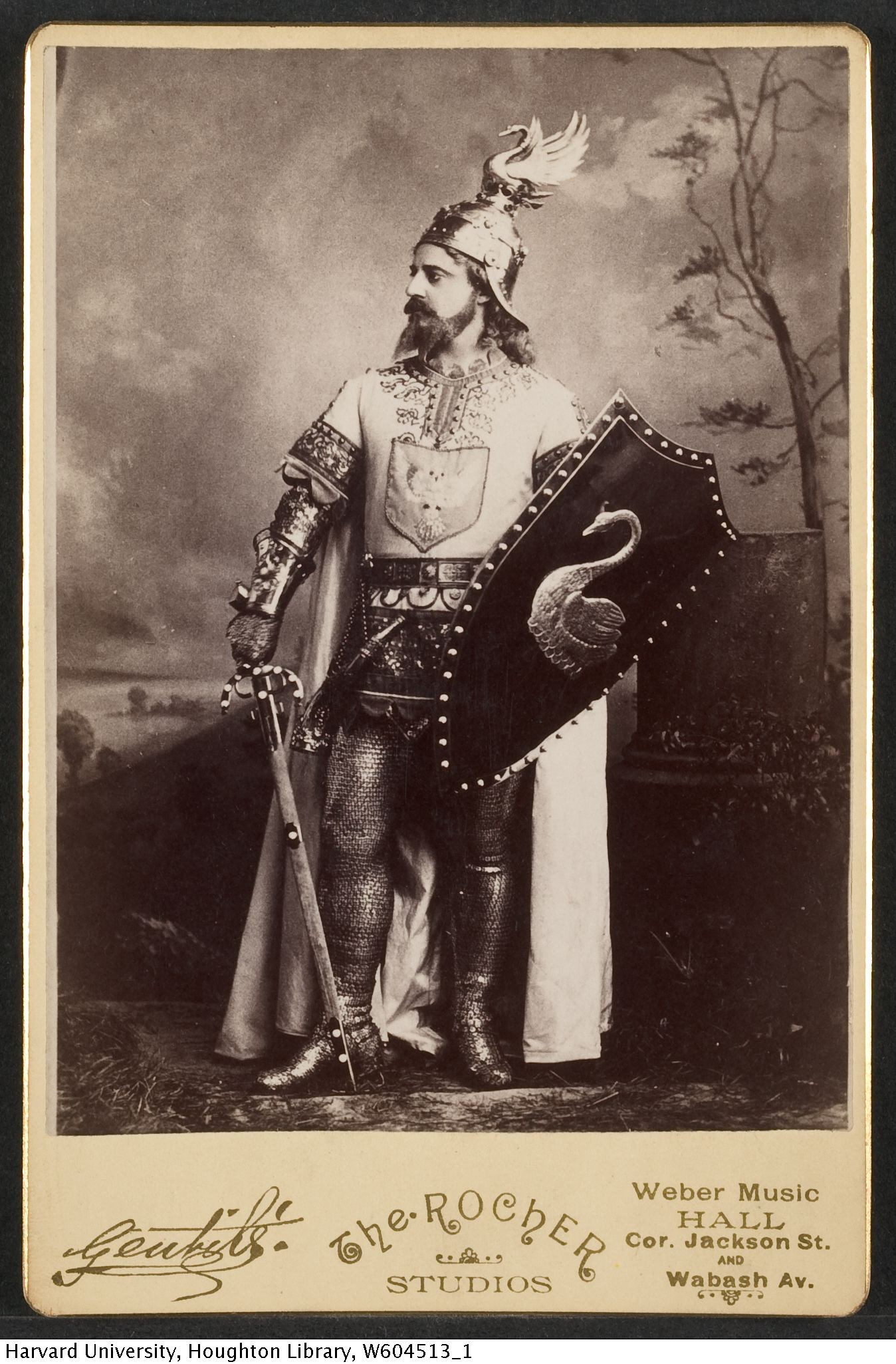

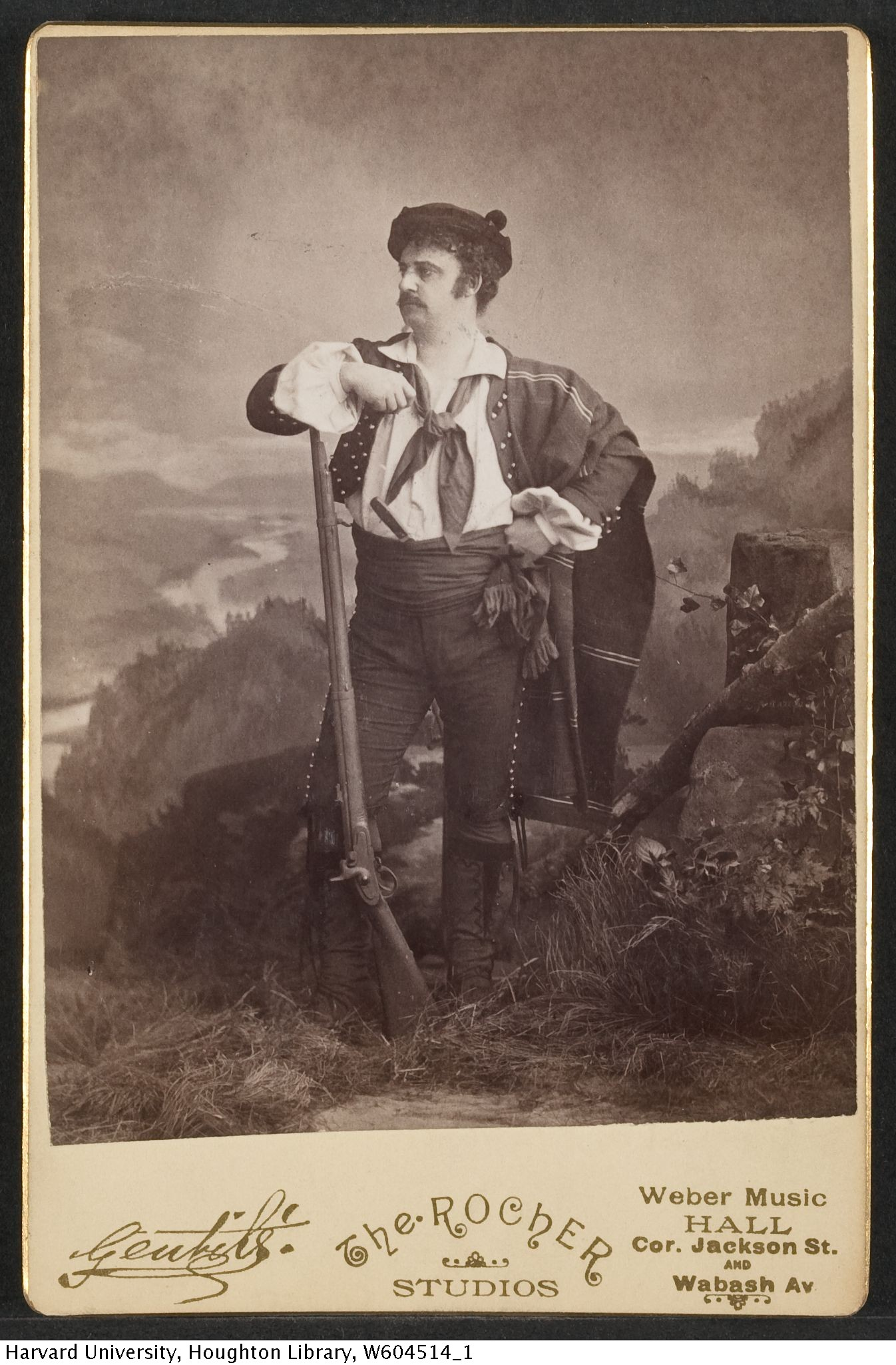

== Sources ==
- Who Was Who in America, Historical Volume 1607-1896. Chicago: Marquis Who's Who, 1963.
- H. Wiley Hitchcock/June C. Ottenberg: "Charles R. Adams", Grove Music Online ed. L. Macy (Accessed September 25, 2008), (subscription access)
