= Arthur Middleton (bass-baritone) =

American opera singer

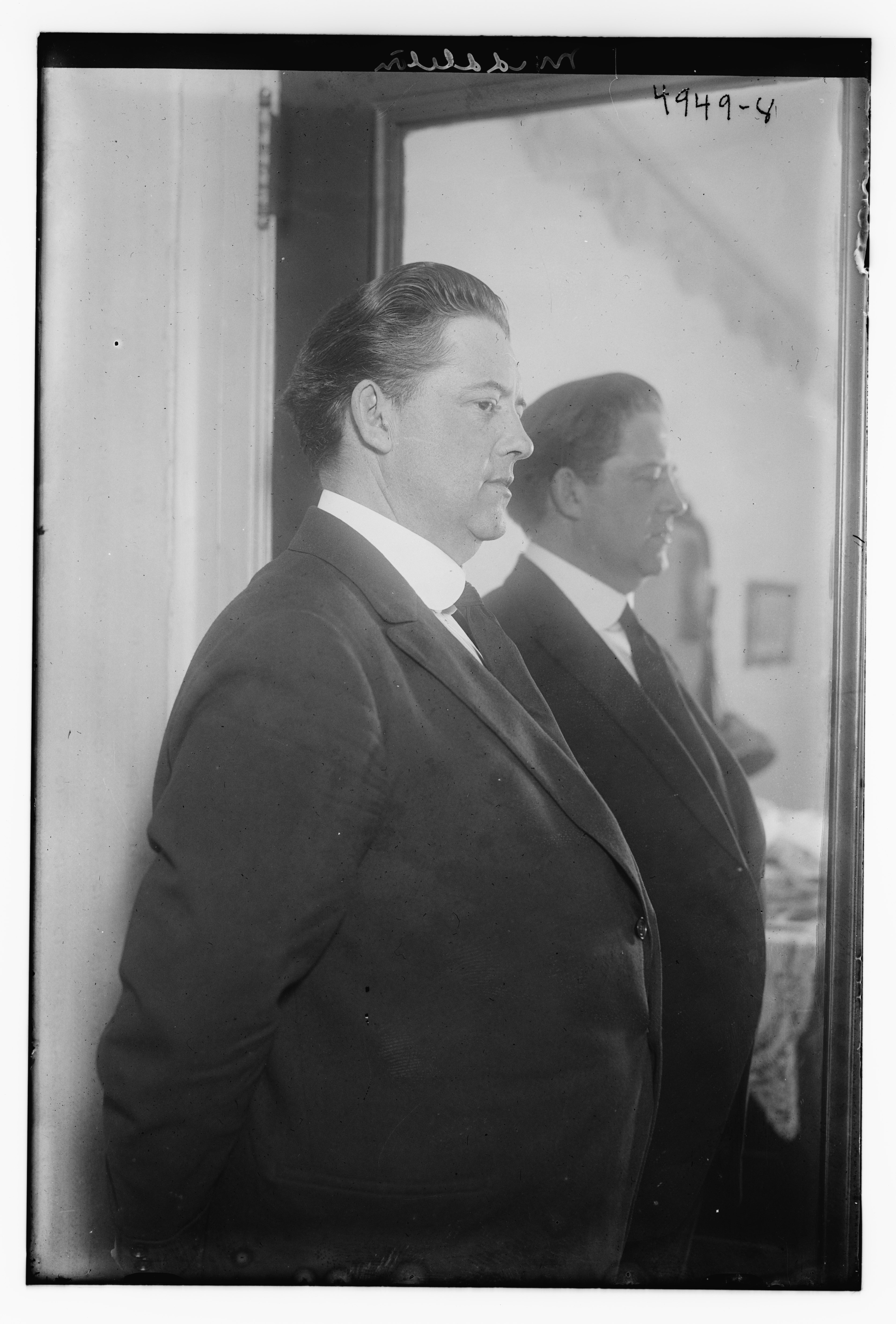
Arthur Middleton

Arthur Middleton (Logan, Iowa, November 28, 1880 – Chicago, Illinois, February 16, 1929) was an American operatic and concert bass-baritone. Father was Wiley Middleton and mother was Julia Lockling Middleton.

== Life ==
Middleton studied with Charles R. Adams and Alexander Emslie and made his debut at the New York Metropolitan Opera in 1914. Other musical associations included the Apollo Club in Chicago and the New York Symphony Orchestra.

Middleton sang secondary roles at the Metropolitan Opera during a tenure encompassing only 22 performances between November 1914 and February 1916. In both his debut on November 18, 1914 and his farewell on February 26, 1916, he appeared as the Herald in Wagner's Lohengrin. He sang two other Wagnerian roles for the company: Titurel in Parsifal and Donner in Das Rheingold. His non-Wagnerian roles were Ludwig in Weber's Euryanthe and Don Fernando in Beethoven's Fidelio. Middleton also appeared at least once with the company on tour in Philadelphia, where he again appeared as the Lohengrin Herald on December 8, 1914.

Middleton's repertory was somewhat more varied and substantial when he participated in seven concerts at the Metropolitan Opera House during approximately the same period, although he tended to repeat selections in successive appearances. In the first concert, taking place on November 22, 1914, just a few days after his Metropolitan Opera debut, he sang O du, mein holder abendstern from Wagner's Tannhäuser and Air du tambour major from Thomas's Le Caïd. In subsequent concerts, he was heard in Wotan's Farewell from Wagner's Die Walküre, Walter Damrosch's celebrated song Danny Deever, and Why Do the Nations from Handel's Messiah and Largo al factotum from Rossini's Il Barbiere di Siviglia, the last two figuring in his final appearance at the house on November 19, 1916.

Middleton's most important operatic assumption came not with the Metropolitan Opera but rather with the Chicago Opera Company; he created the role of Ramatzin in Henry Hadley's opera Azora, the Daughter of Montezuma, which had its world premiere in Chicago in December 1917 and its New York premiere on January 26, 1918. The latter performance, which took place at the Lexington Theater, was part of the Chicago company's first New York season since 1914; Middleton did not participate in another New York debut that opened the series, Mascagni's Isabeau, which had achieved its American debut in Chicago only a few months before. Neither work entered the standard repertory, although Isabeau has clung to its fringes while Azora promptly disappeared entirely. The New York Times, in its review published January 28, 1918, wrote, "Arthur Middleton, a well-known baritone, also made an excellent figure of the noble Tlascalan's rival, the Mexican General Ramatzin."

Middleton appears to have engaged in an active concert career involving widespread travel within the United States. His documented appearances include the following:

- Mankato, Minnesota, December 25, 1912: Soloist in Handel's Messiah together with soprano Mable Sharp Herdien, contralto Genevieve Wheat, and tenor Edward Strong; the organist was Roger Mintener, and Emil Oberhoffer conducted.
- New York, October 29, 1917: Middleton's first New York song recital, given at Aeolian Hall, included Where'er You Walk from Handel's Semele; Schubert's Der Wanderer; the same Thomas and Rossini arias noted above; and lighter fare including old English airs, Hotner's Uncle Rom, Lucy Broadwood's Old Surrey Air, and "ballads from Kipling", presumably including Danny Deever. [New York Times, "Tenor and Baritone Heard", October 30, 1917]
- New York, June, 1918: Participant in Lewisohn Stadium concerts organized for the support and entertainment of American military personnel mobilizing for World War I. [New York Times, "Wartime 'Pop' Concerts", June 16, 1918]
- Spartanburg, South Carolina, May, 1921: Participant in Converse College Choral Society 25th anniversary concert series. [New York Times, "Music News and Notes", May 1, 1921]
- Weatherford, Oklahoma, 1921: Concert at the Southwestern Normal Auditorium.
- San Francisco, California, December 15, 1925: Soloist in first performance of Handel's Messiah by the San Francisco Symphony Orchestra; other soloists were Lorna Lachmund, Belle Montgomery, Paul Althouse, and Warren D. Allen, and Alfred Hertz conducted.
- Des Moines, Iowa, 1926: Appeared in The Birth of the Messiah at the Iowa State Fair.

Middleton also taught singing; among his pupils was Olive Townend-Middleton. Middleton also coached his nephew, actor Ray Middleton, at the outset of the latter's musical career. Arthur Middleton died in February 1929 of Bright's Disease.

== Recordings ==
Despite his less than stellar operatic career, Middleton became in essence the house bass for Thomas Edison's National Phonograph Company, which promoted his association with the Metropolitan Opera and recorded him in repertory of far larger import and scope than anything he presented on the stage. Middleton recorded not only under his own name but also as Edward Allen and Eduard Mittelstadt. Middleton figured in the company's celebrated "tone tests," in which recording artists would perform in tandem with their recordings, played on Edison equipment, before an audience in order to demonstrate that the two were indistinguishable; one of the first such presentations, taking place on November 18, 1915 at Boston's Symphony Hall, included his recording of Pro Peccatis from Rossini's Stabat Mater, although the live performer on that occasion was contralto Christine Miller.
