= Edith Barakovich =

Austrian photographer

Edith Barakovich (14 February 1896 – 11 December 1940) was an Austrian photographer remembered, in particular, for fashion work and portraiture. She also undertook work as a press photographer.

== Life ==
=== Provenance and early years ===
Edith Barakovich was born in Semlin (known, following subsequent population shifts, by its Serbian name as Zemun), at that time a mid-sized multi-ethnic town just outside Belgrade. Ludwig Barakovich, her father, ran a pharmacy. She was baptised as a Roman Catholic. Between 1913 and 1915 she was a student at the Graphic Design and Research Institute ("Grafische Lehr- und Versuchsanstalt") in Vienna. She combined this with work at the "Atelier d`Ora", studying with Dora Kallmus (also known, professionally, as "Madame D'Ora"). With her formal training thus completed, in 1918 she was accepted for membership of the prestigious Vienna Photographic Society ("Wiener Photographische Gesellschaft" / PhG), and during 1918 she set up a little photography business, based till 1922 at one of two addresses in Vienna's 4th district (on the southside of the city centre). Her business was located in a fashionable quarter near the Vienna State Opera, and she produced society images, portraits and fashion shots. Celebrity subjects from the arts-world included Richard Strauss, Felix Salten and Alexander Lernet-Holenia.

=== Professional success cut short by the rise of Fascism ===
It was probably during the second part of the 1920s that Barakovich married the Viennese author-screenwriter Paul Frank. They relocated together in 1930 to Berlin in connection with Paul Frank's work. Barakovich opened ""Atelier de Moda"", a small studio in the Friedrichstraße in the heart of city, from where she worked as a fashion photographer. Business was good until that morning during the first part of 1933 when they arrived to find a large stone in the middle of the floor and the shop window shattered. As it happened she would have almost precisely the same experience again, five years later, back in Vienna. After the National Socialists took power at the start of 1933 there was no longer any work for them in Germany, apparently for reasons of race, and they returned home to Vienna. However, early in 1938 Austria was incorporated into Nazi Germany. Barakovich and her husband escaped to France. The French government was more generous than most about welcoming refugees from the racial policy of Nazi Germany, but unemployment was a major political and social problem for the Blum government. Work permits were hard to obtain, and the couple had no income apart from the small amount received in royalties from Paul Frank's film-scripts and novels. They went to Paris in order to try and obtain the visa needed to emigrate from France to the United States, but they were unsuccessful.

=== Escape from France ===
German armies invaded France from the north-east on 10 May 1940, capturing Paris (formally) on 14 June. For Frank and Edith it was time to quit the country: on 13 June they had joined the hundreds of thousands of Parisians fleeing south. There were four of them. They were accompanied by Paul Frank's mistress and muse, the photographer Lilly Joseph (1911 – 2006), (Note: Lilly Joseph escaped to the USA in 1941 and married fellow race-refugee Richard Reich in 1958. Her married name became Lilly Joss Reich. She worked for several national magazines, but seems to have abandoned photography by the 1960s. In 1970 she emerged as a successful author of cookery books with "Viennese Pastry Cookbook: From Vienna with Love" which reprised her mothers recipes.) who had been with them since at least as far back as their time in Berlin. The fourth member of the party was Ida Cohn, Lilly's mother. They were still hoping to be able to emigrate to America. Ida had relatives in New York City who would, she was confident, be able to help them with "the paperwork". Meanwhile, they escaped by ship from Biarritz, travelling, in the first instance, to Spain where, following the recent conclusion of the country's brutal civil war, the government remained determined to avoid direct involvement in what was coming to be known as the Second World War.

=== Casablanca ===
They managed to cross Spain and reach Morocco, which at this time was being governed as a French protectorate on behalf of a puppet government operating at the behest of the German government. They found a small home in Casablanca. Lilly and her mother lived close by. Barakovich waited with her husband for an affidavit which would open the way for their escape to the United States. Frank was able obtain a job teaching German at a refugee camp which provided a small income. Barakovich could not work. They had been required to leave most of their possessions behind when they fled Europe, but she had nevertheless managed to retain a small Leica camera. She took to following the packs of dogs out of town to the dunes where they congregated in the evenings, and photographing some of the individual animals, though she knew very well that she would never find anyone to buy the pictures. A friendly local who guided her to the largest of the dunes in the area explained that the packs of dogs had appeared during the Spanish Civil War when they had been able to feast on the bodies of dead escapees from Spain who had attempted to swim across from Tarifa or Algeciras, but drowned. Presumably, he implied, they were staying around in anticipation of rich pickings from the new war which they sensed was again approaching from the north. By the time Frank and Barakovich received entry visas for the US, the exit visas that they needed to leave French Morocco had expired. They had to make a fresh application for new ones to the government in Vichy. Meanwhile, Lilly Joseph and her mother finally obtained the necessary papers and left for New York. More alone than ever, Barakovich and Frank became increasingly desperate and depressed. Paul Frank took to drinking and lost his teaching job, after which they ran out of money. This was the situation in December 1940 when Barakovich took her life with an overdose of Veronal.

Three months later Paul Frank received the papers they had been waiting for and was able to travel to New York on a Spanish passenger ship. In 1942 he moved to the West Coast. He remarried. He would never again experience the professional success he had enjoyed in Vienna and Berlin, but he lived on till 1976.

Photo-portraits by Edith Barakovich

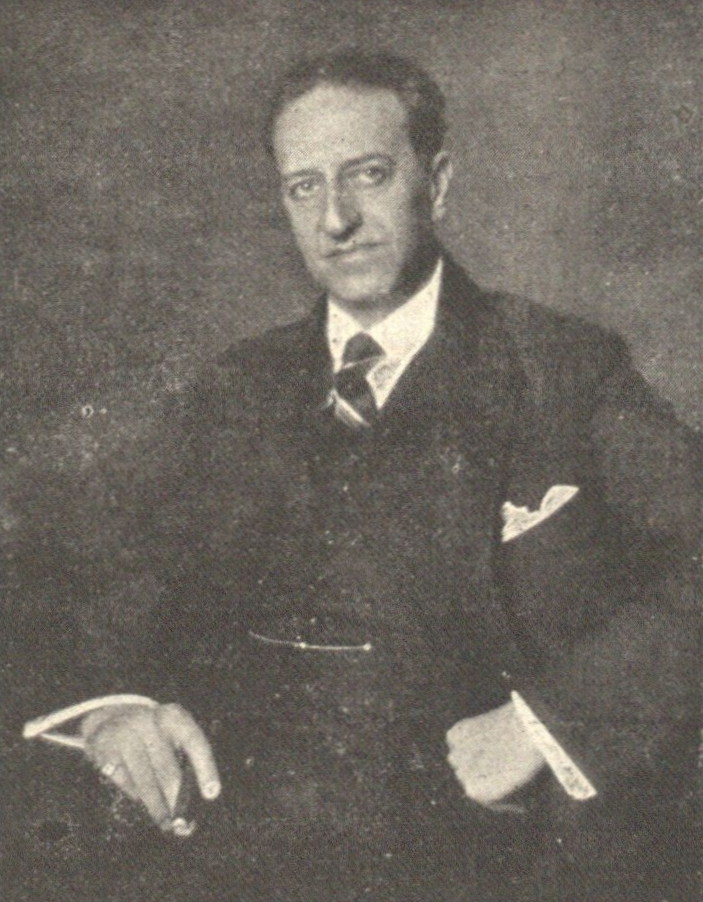
Oscar Straus
(ca 1918)

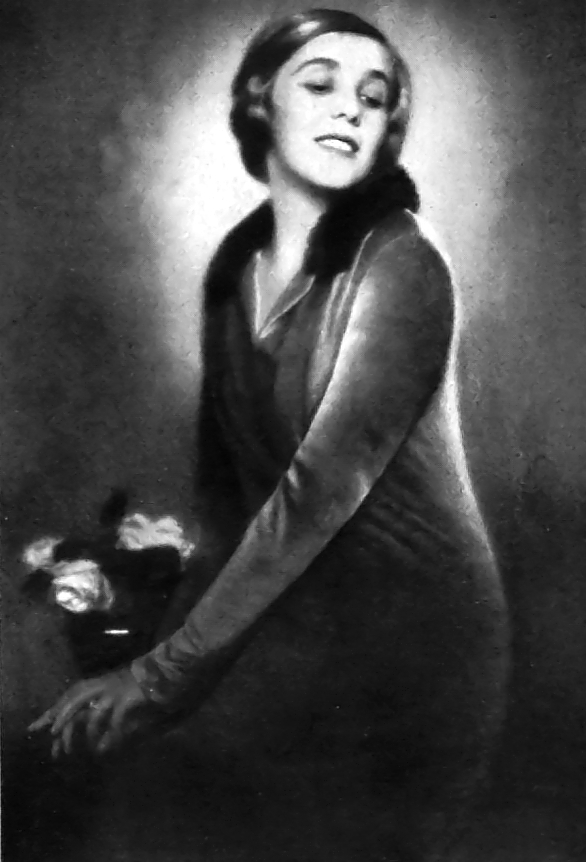
Lili Darvas
(ca 1926)

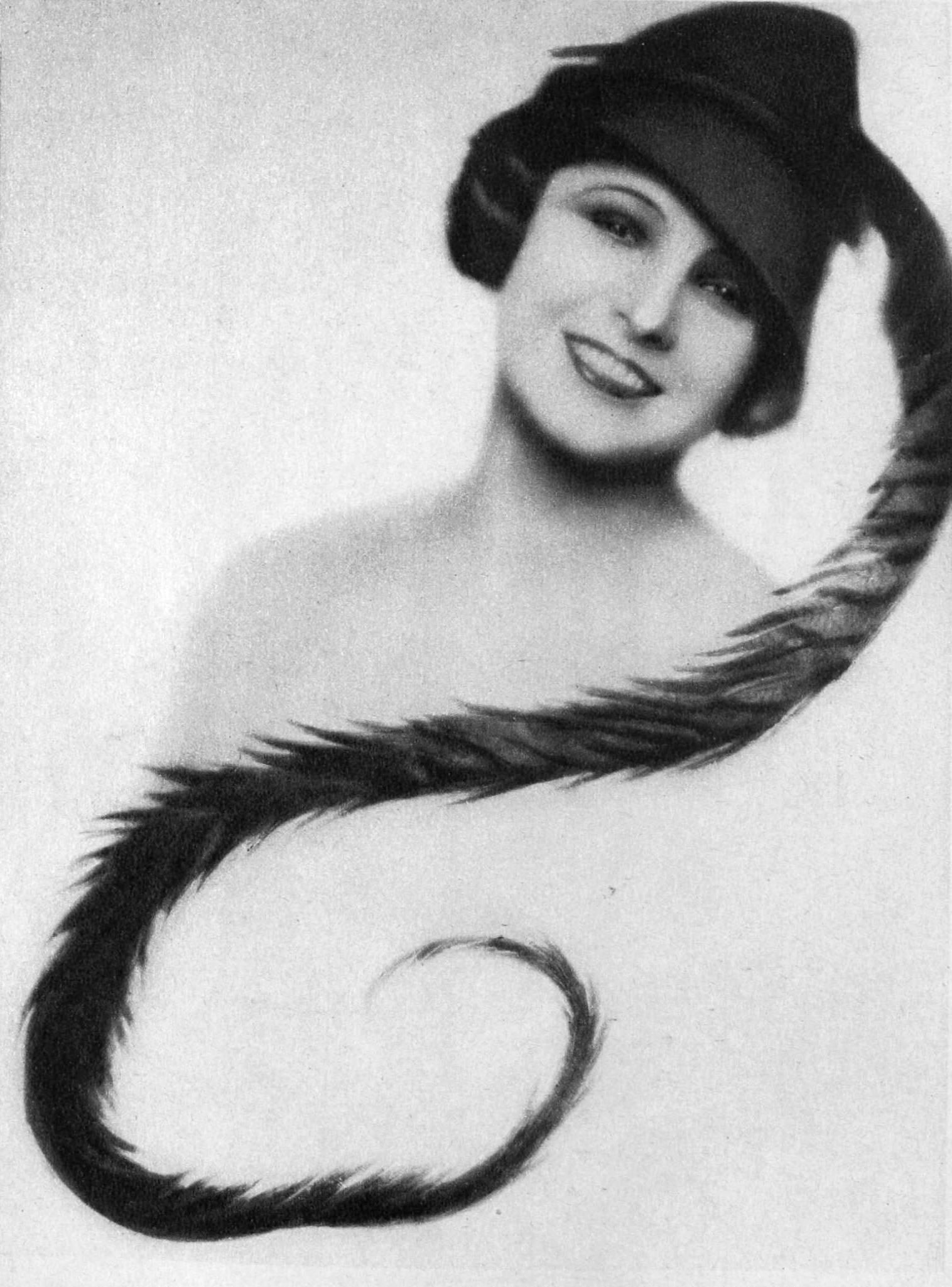
La Jana
(ca 1928)

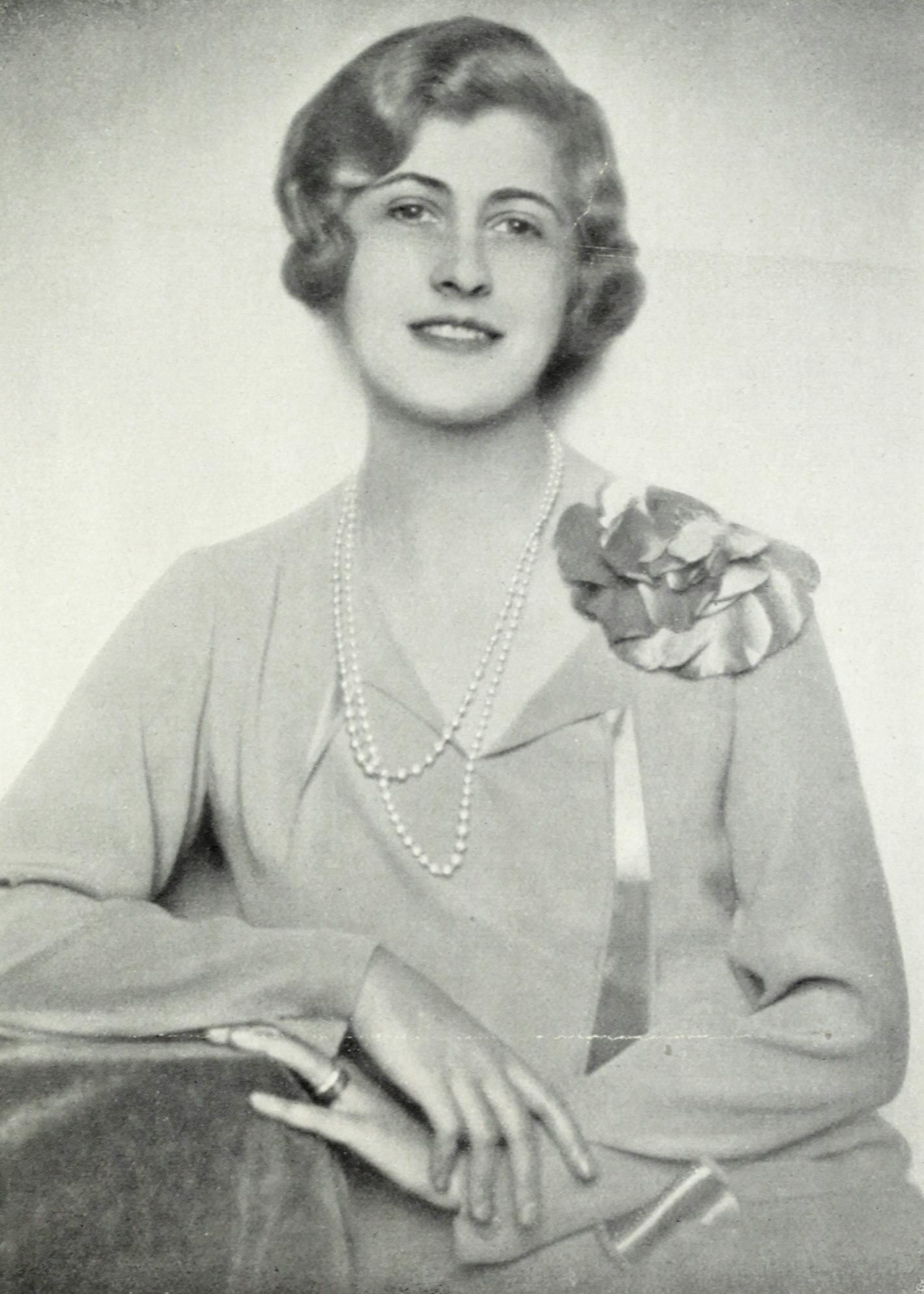
Elisabeth von Morawitz (née Mercy) (1928)

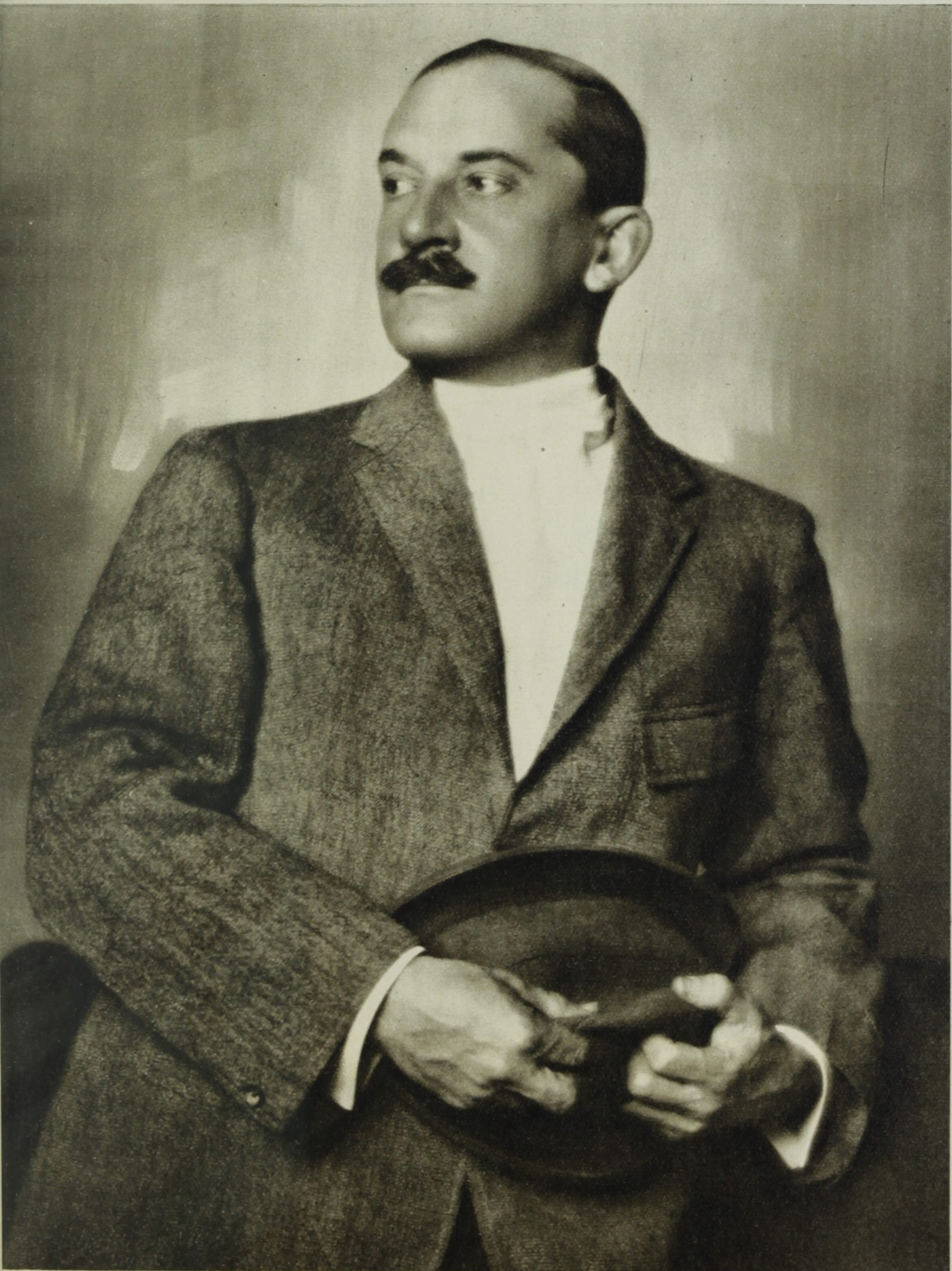
John Quincy Adams
(ca 1930)

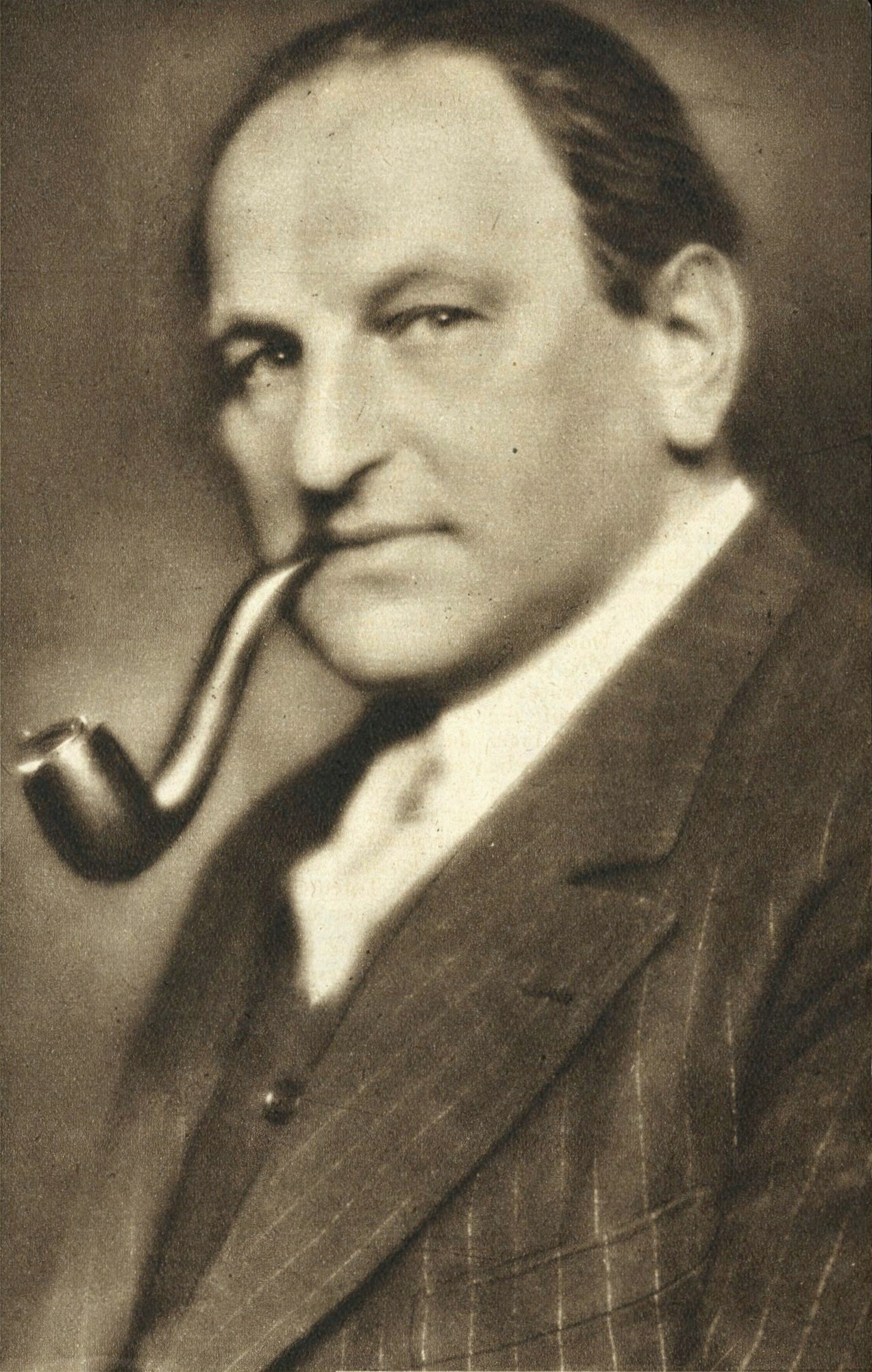
Egon Friedell
(ca 1931)
