= Robert Scheffer =

Austrian painter

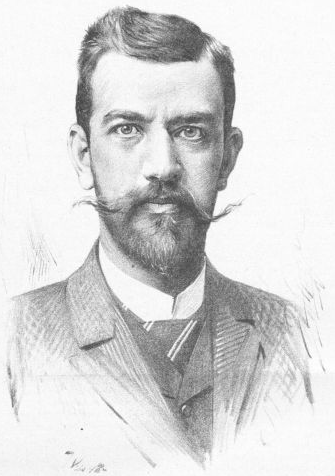
Self-portrait (1891)

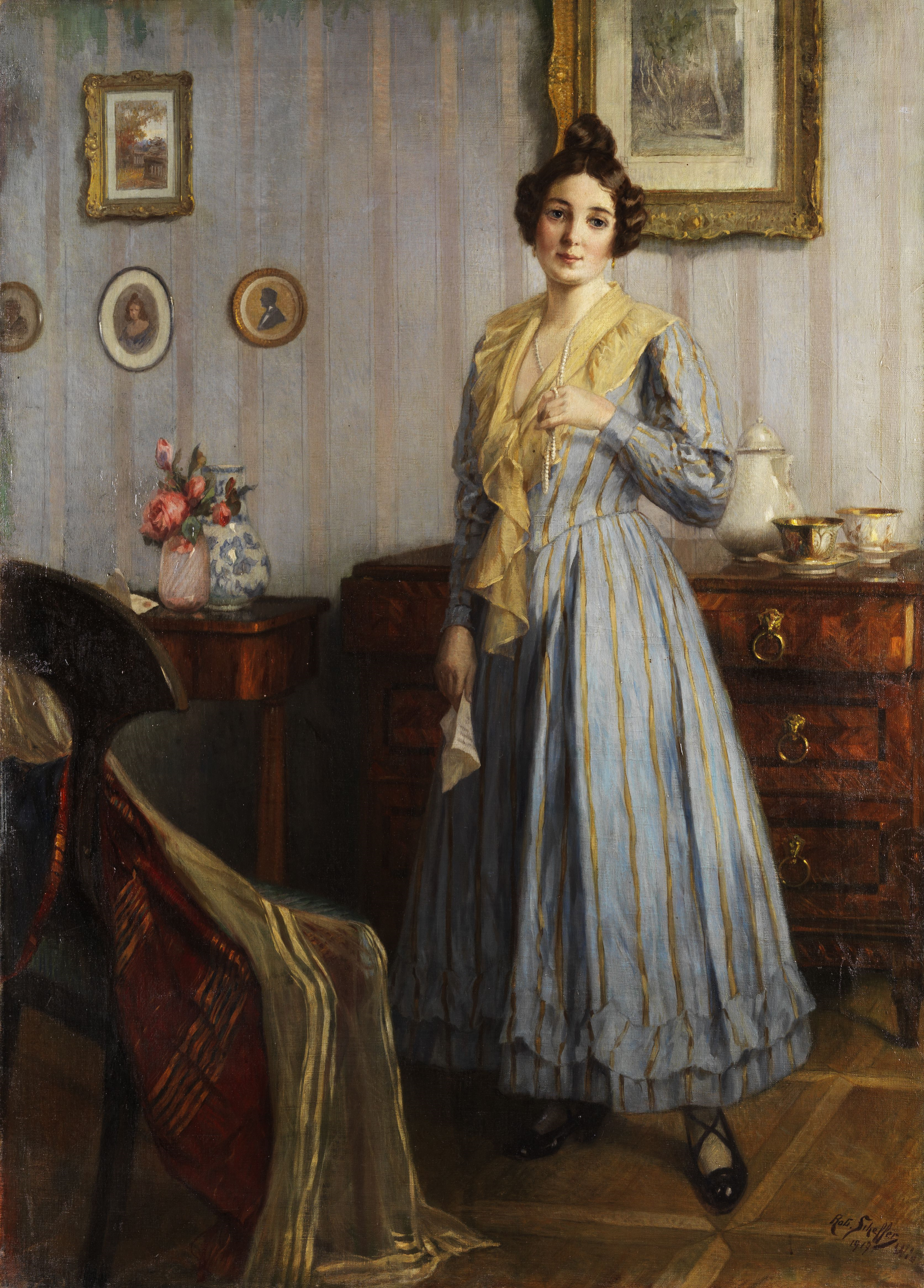
Young Woman in a Biedermeier Interior

Robert Scheffer (6 May 1859, Vienna - 27 October 1934, Vienna) was an Austrian painter. He specialized in landscapes, genre scenes and portraits. He was also an art collector and operated a private art school.

== Biography ==
He studied from 1879 to 1881 at the Academy of Fine Arts, Vienna, with Christian Griepenkerl, Carl Wurzinger and Leopold Carl Müller. By 1886, he had completed his studies at the Academy of Fine Arts, Karlsruhe, in the master classes of Ferdinand Keller.

From 1905 to 1918, he exhibited regularly at the Vienna Künstlerhaus. His most popular paintings were on the theme, "Young Woman in a Biedermeier Interior", of which there are numerous variations.

He served as a board member of the Albrecht Dürer Association; from which he received the Silver Medal of the Albrecht Dürer Bunds in 1930. He was also a recipient of the Silver Medal for Services to the Republic of Austria in 1929.

In 1891, he opened a private art school, together with August Schubert (1844-?), who taught drawing, and Carl Haunold, who taught painting. Many well known artists began as his students, including John Quincy Adams, Robin Christian Andersen, Anton Faistauer, Alice Wanke, Maria Grengg, Josef Kalous (1887-1974), Anton Peschka, Gustav Schütt (1890-1968) and Fritz Zerritsch. After his death, the school was operated until 1949 by his daughter, Gret Kalous, under the name "Schule für künstlerisches Modezeichnen" (School for Artistic Fashion Drawing).

== Sources ==
- (in German) Scheffer, Robert. In: Ulrich Thieme, Felix Becker (editors): Allgemeines Lexikon der Bildenden Künstler von der Antike bis zur Gegenwart. Band 30, E. A. Seemann, Leipzig 1936, S. 6.
- Emmanuel Bénézit: Dictionnaire critique et documentaire des peintres, sculpteurs, dessinateurs et graveurs de tous les temps et de tous les pays. Vol. 9, Gründ, Paris 1976, ISBN 9782700001495, pg.355.
- Joachim Busse: Internationales Handbuch aller Maler und Bildhauer des 19. Jahrhunderts. Wiesbaden 1977.
- Allgemeines Künstlerlexikon. Bio-bibliographischer Index A-Z. Saur, Munich 1999–2000, Vol. 8, pg.752.
