= Papantzin =

Papantzin (fl. 1509 - fl. 1525) was a Texcocoan princess, the granddaughter of Nezahualpilli, and the sister of Moctezuma II, whose policy was to marry his brothers and male relatives to the daughters of (potentially) rival kings, and thus secure his realm.

The legend of Papantzin was used as part of the Spanish conquest of the Aztec Empire. In 1509, Papantzin fell seriously ill and became comatose. Believing her dead, the Texcocoans laid her in a tomb (unlike the Aztecs who burned their dead), but almost immediately, the mourners heard her cry out to be released. She related a vision, in which a luminous being with "crossed sticks" on his forehead led her to the shore of the Atlantic Ocean, where she saw several large "floating houses" (ships) approach from the horizon, having black crosses on their "wings" (sails) similar to that on her guide's forehead. The princess was informed that the men in the ships came from a distant land and would conquer the Aztecs and bring a knowledge of the One True God. When she related this vision to Moctezuma, he read the doom of his empire in it, and refused to ever speak to her again.

Ten years later, the Spanish conquered Mexico, and Papantzin became one of the first natives to convert to Christianity. She was baptized in 1525 when the first Franciscan friars evangelized Texcoco.

The legend of Papantzin was painted by painted Isidro Martinez in 1880.
