= Rožnov Castle =

Ruin of a castle in the Czech Republic

Rožnov
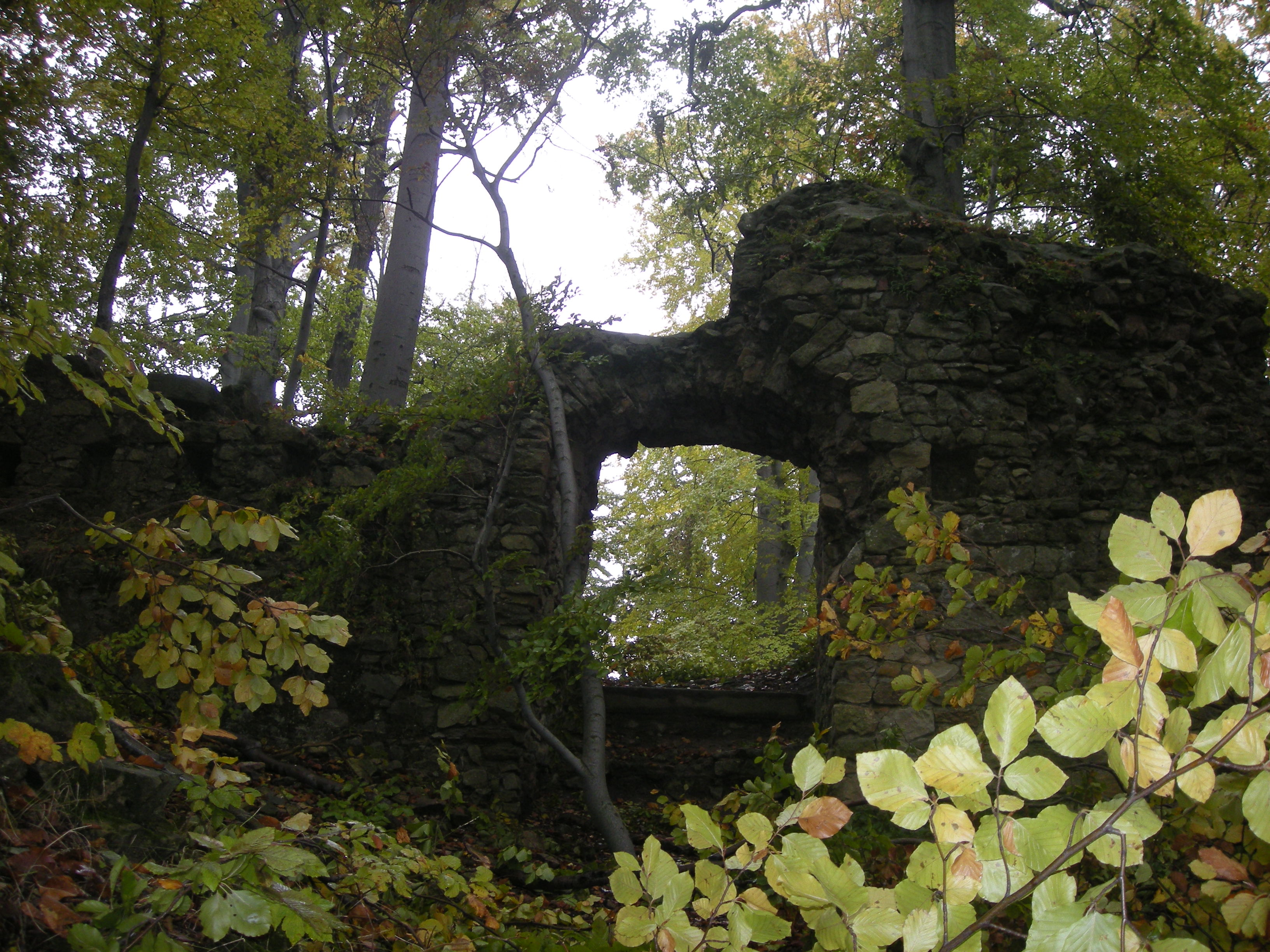
- The old castle gate and remains of walls
- Alternative names: Rožnov Castle

General information
- Town or city: Rožnov pod Radhoštěm
- Country: Czechia
- Coordinates: 49°27′11.52″N 18°7′13.08″E
- Elevation: 520m asl
- Year(s) built: est. 1267

Rožnov Castle is a ruined castle located two kilometers southwest of the Wallachian town of Rožnov pod Radhoštěm, Czech Republic. It was constructed in the 14th century. The castle has not been used since the 17th century, after that the townspeople used the castle for home building materials. Since 1964, it has been protected as a cultural monument.

== History ==
The castle was built around the year 1267 by Bruno von Schauenburg, Bishop of Olomouc. Its purpose was to protect the border with Upper Hungary (present-day Slovakia). It also served as the seat of the bishop’s vassal, Bohuslav of Krasno, who is the source of the first written record of the castle, dated 1310. The castle, originally built around a hilltop plateau, was expanded several times—particularly with ramparts, enceintes (outer walls), and later with bastions.

The first mention of an owner dates back to 1372, naming Vok I. of Kravaře. Subsequently, the castle was owned by the Lords of Cimburk and the Lords of Pezinok. In 1505, it was acquired by the Poděbrady family, and in 1526 by Jaroslav of Šelmberk. In 1535, the castle became the property of Jan IV of Pernštejn, but just four years later, in 1539, it was seized by royal troops on the orders of King Ferdinand I and heavily damaged, as it had been occupied by bandits. The castle was later provisionally repaired, and by 1660 it was once again used by manor officials. By the end of the 17th century, however, it had been completely abandoned. In the second half of the 19th century, the citizens of Rožnov pod Radhoštěm were granted permission by the municipal authorities to dismantle the castle ruins and use the material for building their homes.

== Photo Gallery ==
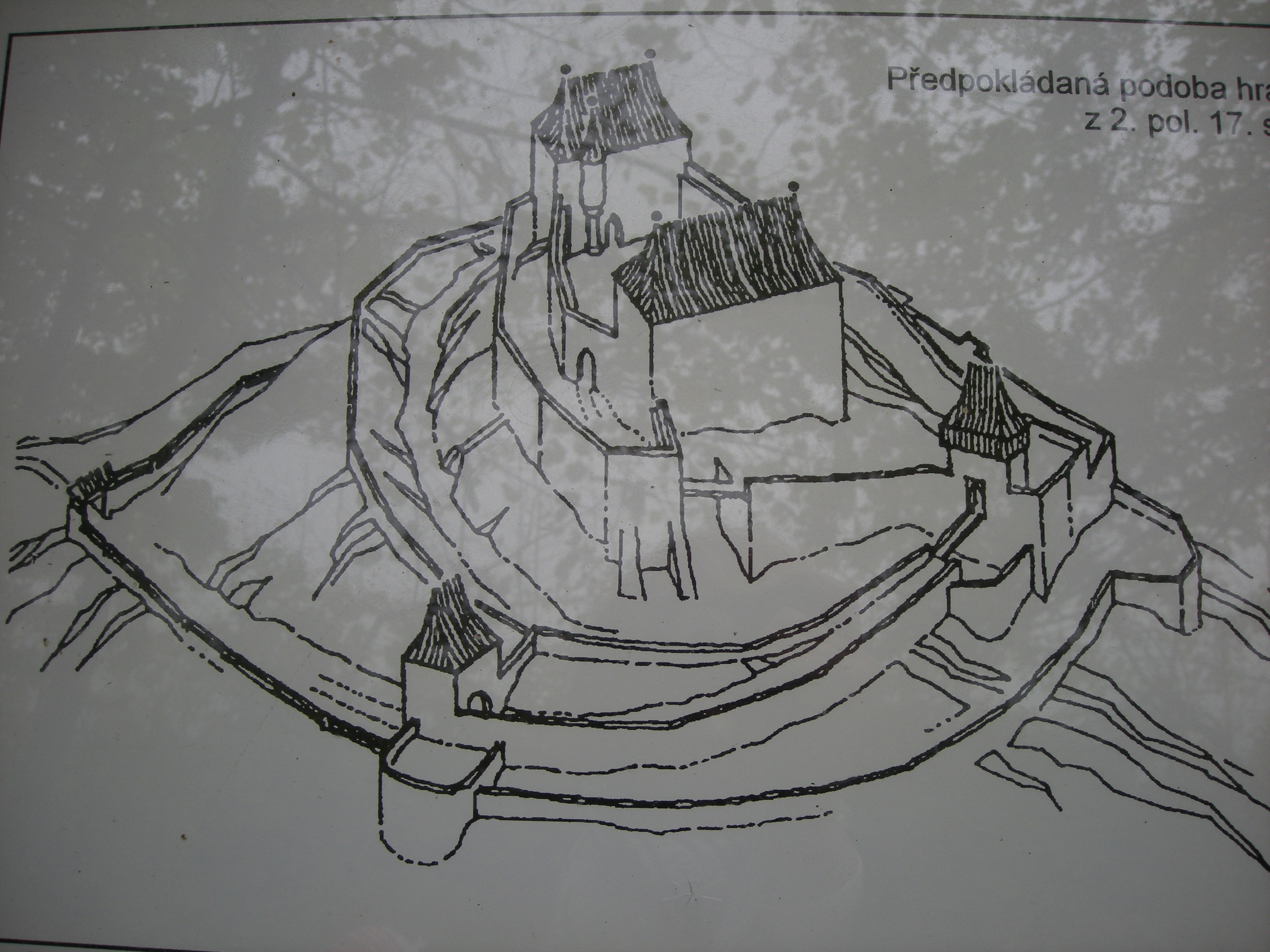
The castle’s likely appearance in the 17th century

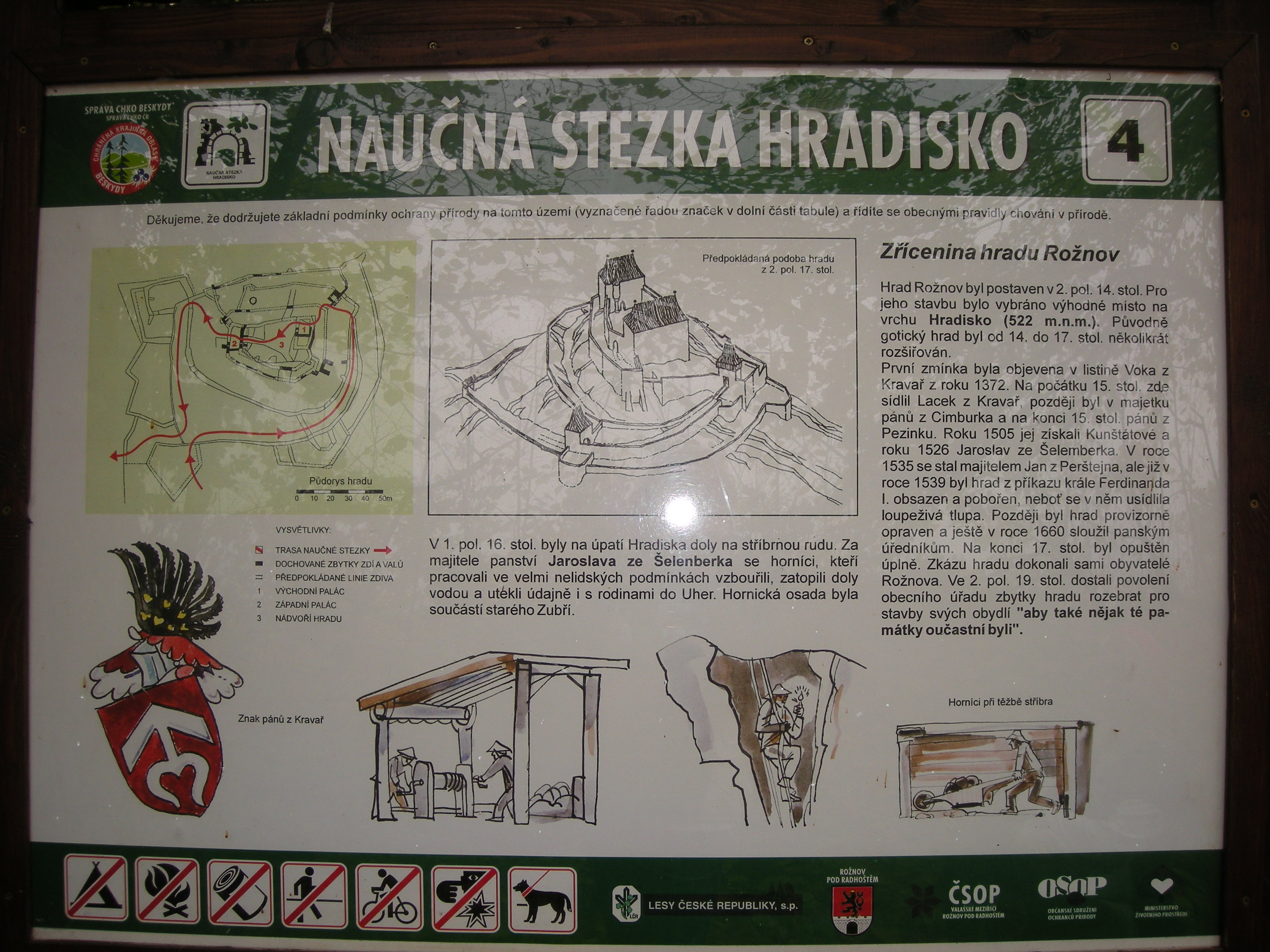
Hradisko information panel
