= Bohumír Jaroněk =

Czech painter (1866–1933)

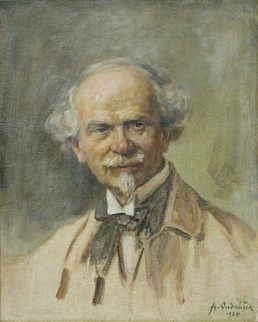
Bohumír Jaroněk (1924); portrait by František Ondrúšek

Bohumír Jaroněk (23 April 1866 – 18 January 1933) was a Czech painter of landscapes and founder of the Wallachian Open Air Museum in Rožnov pod Radhoštěm. He worked with watercolours, temperas, and oil paints.

== Biography ==
Jaroněk was born on 23 April 1866 in Zlín. He came from a family of dyers. After attending a German primary school, he studied woodworking at the local technical school in Valašské Meziříčí from 1885 to 1889. Over the following years, he worked as a model maker at numerous arts and crafts workshops in Budapest and Munich. He also did printmaking, painted and pursued studies in folklore and folk architecture. An avid traveller, he visited Belgium, France, Italy, Scandinavia, Germany and Egypt.

In 1896, he returned home and joined his brother, Alois, at his porcelain studio. Four years later, he became one of the first members of the Vienna Hagenbund. In 1909, he and his family moved to Rožnov pod Radhoštěm. There, together with his brother, he established a workshop where they produced painted wooden chests, boxes, wooden toys, postcards, woven pillows, handbags and screens. His sister, Julie, produced tapestries. Later, they created a separate workshop for painted pottery and porcelain.

He was an active participant in the cultural and social events of his adopted city. His primary project was the creation of an open-air museum to preserve samples of architectural timber carvings that were at risk in their original environment; an idea inspired by a visit to the Skansen in Stockholm. An ethnographic association was created in 1911, with this goal in mind. He served as its President until 1926. The project was finally realized in 1925, when the "Valašské Muzeum v Přírodě" opened with a major festival, featuring folk songs, dances, storytelling and crafts.

He became seriously ill in the winter of 1932 and was taken to a hospital in Zlín, where he died on 18 January 1933.

== Selected paintings ==
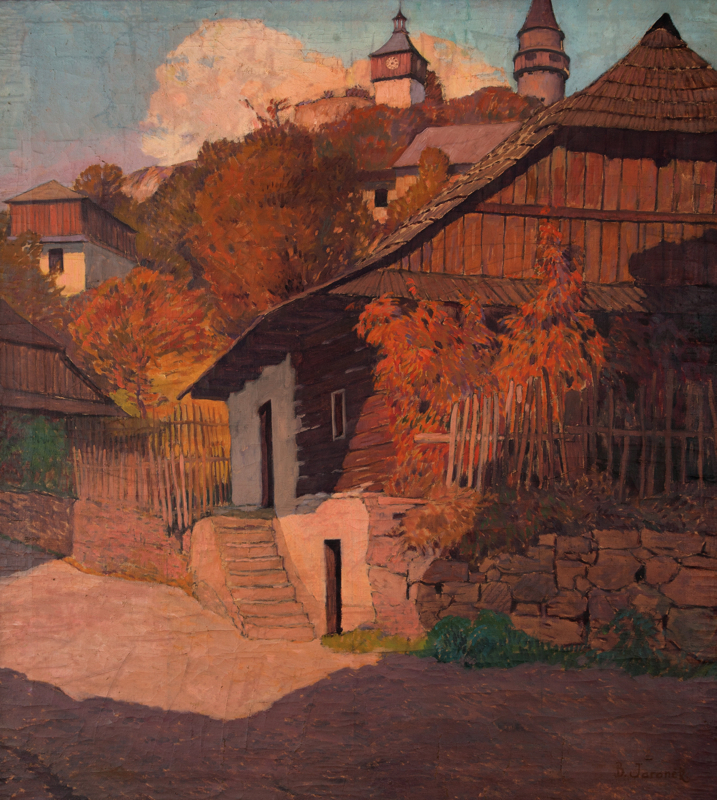
Štramberk

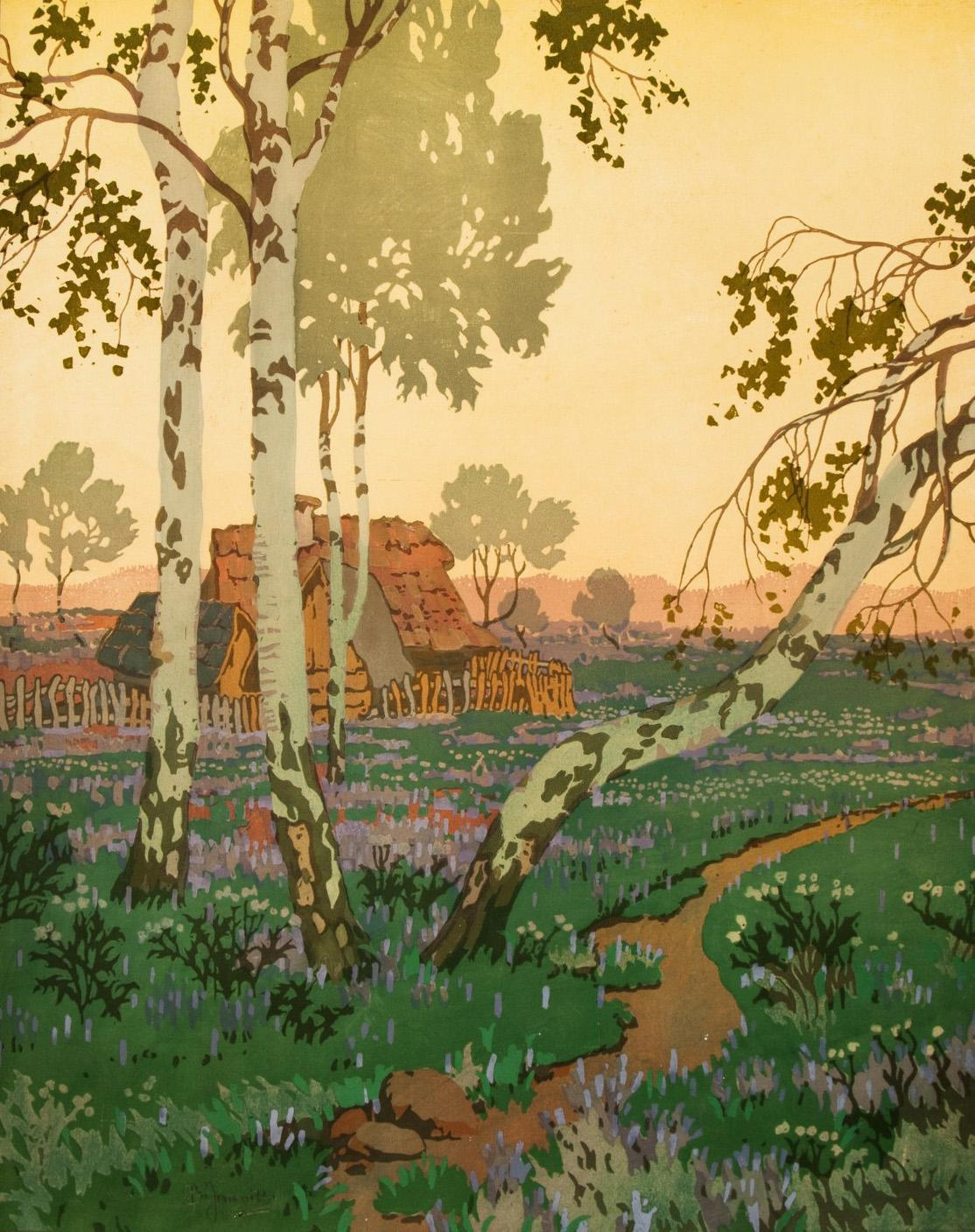
Birches

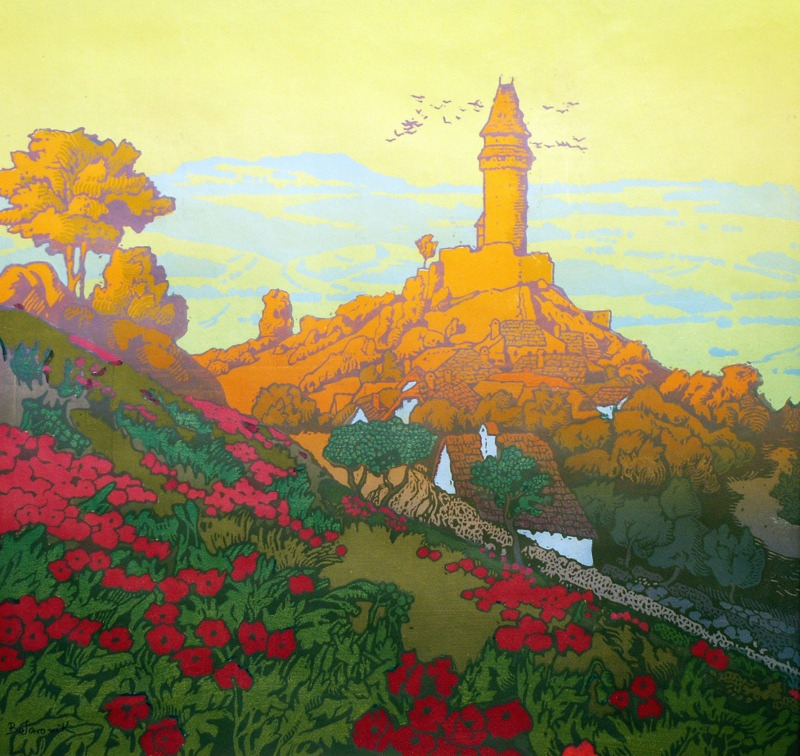
Trúba Castle

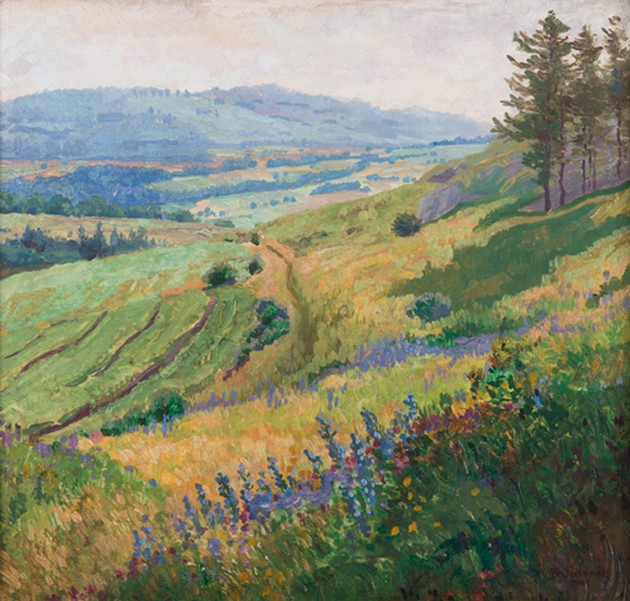
Meadow on the Forest's Edge
