= Benjamin Leroy Wigfall =

American artist (1930-2017)

Benjamin Wigfall
- Born: November 17, 1930; Richmond, Virginia
- Died: February 9, 2017 (aged 86); New Paltz, New York
- Known for: Painter, printmaker, educator

Benjamin Leroy Wigfall (1930–2017) was an American abstract-expressionist painter, printmaker, teacher, gallery owner, and collector of African art. He was the founder of a community art space called Communications Village as a hub for residents in a Black neighborhood in Kingston, New York. At the age of 20, he was the youngest artist ever to have a painting purchased by the Virginia Museum of Fine Arts.

== Early life and education ==
Benjamin Leroy Wigfall was born on November 17, 1930, to James Andrews Wigfall and Willie Cozenia Johnson Wigfall. He grew up in the working-class Black neighborhood of Church Hill in Richmond, VA. His mother worked in a tobacco factory, cleaned houses, and was a beautician. His father was a firefighter for the Chesapeake and Ohio Railway. Benjamin was the youngest of three children.

Wigfall started drawing while a student at George Mason Elementary School, first creating cartoons and later becoming observant of his neighborhood, including a house on 30th Street that he drew in pen and ink. When he was a teenager, his father found a nude drawing he had made. Wigfall was worried that his father would be upset, but he was happy to see the talent in his son.

At Armstrong High School over several years, Wigfall persuaded the principal to hire an art teacher, who did not arrive until the spring of his senior year. Teacher Stafford W. Evans took him to the Virginia Museum, and then signed him up for classes. Wigfall's interest was portraiture until he saw Lyonel Feininger’s abstract painting “Moonwake.” Riding a bus one day, he noticed on the window some reflections of windows from a building. He then understood Feininger's painting and discovered abstraction. By the time he was 30, he completely gave up figurative art.

An assistant state art supervisor whom he met at the museum encouraged him to apply for a museum fellowship. He submitted an application along with the drawing of the house in Church Hill, titled “The House on 30th Street.” In 1949, he received the first of three fellowships. When he arrived to pick up the fellowship, museum workers thought he was part of the service staff and sent him to another entrance.

Wigfall received fellowships in 1949–50, 1951–52 and 1952–53, the third routed through the museum from an anonymous donor. He enrolled at Hampton Institute (now university) and was president of the Art Club for two years. He was surrounded by a faculty of established artists. His instructors included abstract artist Albert Kresch and Leo Katz, chair of the art department who was a noted artist and president of the Virginia Art Alliance; ceramicist Joseph W. Gilliard and sculptor Louis Rosenfeld.

He studied art education and graduated in 1953. He met his wife Mary Carter, an art student at the school, when he and friend L. Douglas Wilder (who later became Virginia's governor) crashed a party. He and Carter got married in 1955 and had two children.

Wigfall received a Rockefeller Foundation fellowship to attend the University of Iowa after graduation. In 1954, he was awarded fellowships to Yale University - and found a mentor in abstract artist/teacher Gabor Peterchi – and the Yale-Norfolk Summer School in Norfolk, CT. With another fellowship in hand in 1958, he returned to Yale and earned a Master of Fine Arts degree in 1959.

== Art career ==
Wigfall was an abstract artist whose forte was printmaking. He was a regional artist whose heyday was in the 1950s, when he won awards, fellowships, news coverage and accolades.

Considered a “gifted young artist,” he had a long history with the Virginia Museum. When he was a sophomore at Hampton in 1951, the museum bought his abstract oil painting “Chimneys” during its biennial exhibition “Virginia Artists 1951.” At age 20, Wigfall was the youngest of the five artists whose works were chosen. The painting, purchased for $90, was part of the museum's national traveling show.

The painting was inspired by smokestacks atop industrial buildings that Wigfall saw at dusk as he often crossed the Marshall Street viaduct over Shockoe Valley. Usually, the stacks were busily billowing smoke but at that time of day, they were quiet and serene, he told an interviewer in 2003. “Things are abstract but at the same time quite real,” he explained once, noting that there was “nobility in something very common.”

Being a talented young artist did not shield Wigfall from the racial discrimination of the time. In 1957 while teaching at Hampton, he and student Paul Dusenburg went shopping at two department stores in Richmond, according to an article in the college newspaper Hampton Spirit. After they left the second store, Miller & Rhoads, Wigfall was accosted by police officers, grabbed by the collar, and accused of trying to steal a handbag and wallet the day before. He denied the accusation. He was arrested on a vagrancy charge and taken to jail. Insisting on going to trial, Wigfall enlisted local civil rights attorney Oliver W. Hill. At trial, the charge was shoplifting and not vagrancy, and it was dropped. When the incident occurred, “Chimneys” was on display in the Miller & Rhoads store window.

A year later, the Virginia Museum purchased his tempera painting “Corrosion and Blue” during “American Painting 1958,” its quadrennial exhibition of the best talents in contemporary American art. Wigfall mixed mud in the paint to give it non-color, he told an interviewer in 2003. Wigfall “achieves a strange effect of a different sort … in which streaks of orange and blue glow like live coals in a thick enveloping web of brown ashes,” a reviewer stated.

In 1951, Langley Air Force Base in Hampton chose Wigfall's painting “Kites” to hang in a room in its library. It was the first painting picked by Langley in a program to provide space for works by local artists and authors. The work was on loan from Hampton.

In 1953, Wigfall created sketches for a mural depicting Christ and Judas. It consisted of five full-size panels titled “Disturbance of Temptation,” “The Decision,” “The Kiss,” “Remorse,” “Consequence and Self-Punishment.” That same year, the Norfolk Museum of Arts and Sciences (now the Chrysler Museum of Art) held a one-man show of his works, with Wigfall described by one writer as “Tidewater’s national ‘find.’” Among his entries were drawings and plans for the mural.

During the 1950s, Wigfall participated in several other exhibitions, including faculty art shows, and activities. Among them:

1951 & 1953 - Annual art exhibitions at Hampton’s commencements. In 1951, when Mary McLeod Bethune was speaker, he was big news: One article noted that the exhibition “has received added interest” because of the recent purchase of Wigfall's “Chimneys.” In 1953, his submission to the commencement show was the mural project.

1951 – Only Virginia artist represented in the Contemporary American Art Exhibition at the Metropolitan Museum of Art in New York.

1951 – “Chimneys” mounted in an exhibit at the Virginia Museum. Works by three of Hampton's faculty were also shown: Joseph W. Gilliard, Louis Rosenfeld and painter Helen Kendall.

1952-1959 – At Norfolk Museum in 1952, among Hampton students and staff - including Albert Kresch, Joseph W. Gilliard, Louis Rosenfeld - who submitted paintings, ceramics, creative photography and sculptures. Wigfall submitted what were described as semi-abstracts: “Wounded Beasts,” Carnivorous Symbols,” “Boats” and “Urban.” In 1953, he had a one-man show at the museum. In 1954, three of his works – “Mourners,” “Crucifixion” and “The Beast” – were shown. In 1955, “Mourners” was one of 30 pieces chosen for the Tidewater Artists Open Annual. In 1956, the museum hung a Wigfall abstract in a furnished room in an exhibit titled “March for Moderns,” which combined architecture, interior decorations and art in a contemporary home design. In 1959, he was among art faculty at Virginia colleges who splattered paint on canvases in a show titled "Fresh Paint Exhibit."

1952 – One of 20 students picked by Hampton Student Council to represent the college in the 1952-1953 edition of Who's Who Among Students in American Universities and Colleges. He was included in a newspaper photo of the students, standing in the second row.

1953 – Recipient of a Purchase Prize at Hampton - an award given for purchase of his artwork by the college.

1955 - One of 85 artists selected for the Brooklyn Museum (of Art) National Print Annual. His woodcut appeared on the cover of the annual.

1955 - Named one of the 35 best painters in America by directors of 10 of the country's leading museums. The announcement appeared in the February issue of “Art in America” magazine under the title “New Talent in America.” Works by the artists were exhibited at Jackson Gallery in New York and were part of the American Federation of Artists traveling exhibit in 1956. Wigfall described his work as abstract expressionism.

1956 – Included in a group show of Hampton faculty members, including painters Peter Kahn and John Koos, at the Norfolk Division of Virginia State College. (The division is now Norfolk State University and Virginia State is now university.)

1956 - Included in the book "American Painting Today: A Cross-Section of Our Contemporary Art," edited by Nathaniel Pousette-Dart. Wigfall's painting "Chimneys" was reproduced in the book.

1958 - Among 50 artists from the South Atlantic states in a show at Gibbs Art Gallery in Charleston, SC. His entry was an oil painting.

1958 – Chosen to participate in the first Provincetown, MA, arts festival titled “American Art of Our Time,” with 33 works by artists from Ohio, Kentucky, Virginia and West Virginia.

1958 - Loaned to the Virginia Museum's “American Artists 1958” exhibition a painting titled “Without Black” by Ulfert Wilke of the Allen R. Hite Art Institute at the University of Louisville.

1958 - Commissioned to design the 10th annual Christmas card for the Virginia Museum. The design is part of the museum's permanent collection. It was included in a display titled “Designs for Christmas” in the museum lobby in 1964.

Wigfall's works could be found sporadically in exhibits during the 1960s and 1970s. In 1963, he was among four faculty members, including painter Lorraine Bolton, in a show at Hampton. In 1976, he was shown at Gallery One in Poughkeepsie, NY, owned by a fellow instructor at SUNY New Paltz, NY.

In 1988, Wigfall opened Watermark/Cargo Gallery in Kingston, which featured African art from his own collection, and exhibitions of works by national and international contemporary artists. He held solo and group exhibits in the 1990s and into the 2000s, and sold African art. The gallery reopened in 2006 after having closed three years earlier. It was in operation for about 20 years.

== Teacher and mentor ==
Wigfall the teacher supplanted him as an artist. He was described as a "gifted" teacher and mentor who was generous with his time for both students and other artists. Wigfall returned to Hampton as an assistant professor of art in 1955. He taught painting, basic design, graphics and introduction to art. He worked alongside some notable local and national artists, including Louis Rosenfeld, Joseph Gilliard, and painters John Koos and Friedrich Gronstedt.

Wigfall remained at Hampton until 1963, when he took a position at the State University of New York (SUNY) New Paltz. He was the school's first Black professor of art, teaching classes in printmaking, and one of the first Black professors. He attended Black Student Union meetings, and was among the faculty and students involved in creating the Black Studies Department in 1969, one of the earliest in the country. He remained at the school for nearly 30 years, retiring in 1991 and devoting his time to his gallery. The school set up an MFA printmaking scholarship in his name.

In 1972, Wigfall took a teaching job as an associate professor of fine arts at the University of South Florida in Tampa so he could work with a federal Model Cities-funded community arts center. Called the New Place, it was described as a “media exploration and communications center” that offered music, photography, art, dance, theater and other programs for children and adults. Wigfall, the co-director, came up with the idea for "audiographic prints," which were created by transferring interviews with community people to tapes and "typographical prints" for viewing simultaneously.

== Communications Village ==
After arriving to teach in New Paltz, Wigfall began looking around for a space for his studio away from the college and his home. He found an abandoned livery stable in Ponckhockie, a Black working-class neighborhood in Kingston. He bought the building with a plan to convert it into his print shop. When he started working on it, young people kept stopping by to help. So, he expanded his idea to instead turn the building into a community print shop. He chose the name Communications Village as a way for artists to communicate with the world in which they lived.

He opened Communications Village in 1973 as a place where community people took classes, absorbed lectures from major national artists, and learned and executed printmaking. They also participated in photography, poetry, oral history, driving lessons, fence-building and cooking. He taught them how to use the printing press and the darkroom. He gave them money so they could shoot photos with a Polaroid camera.

In a visiting-artists program, professional artists – many of whom were colleagues and friends from New Paltz to New York, as well as his students – came to print their own works with the assistance of local printer assistants. Among the artists were Benny Andrews, Romare Bearden, Robert Blackburn, Melvin Edwards, Charles Gaines, and Mavis Pusey.

A gallery was added several years later. In a 1977 exhibit at the site, Wigfall showed his works as well as those of such artists as Benny Andrews, Betty Blayton, Jayne Cortez, Melvin Edwards, Charles Gaines, Diane Hunt, Pat Jow, Mary Lou Morgan and Joe Ramos. That same year, he held a show of drawings, paintings, prints and photographs from a six-week Children's Workshop. It was headed by his wife Mary, a retired public school art teacher who was employed in a migrant child-care program, and photographer Rose Tripoli.

Communications Village received funding from New York State Council on the Arts, IBM and the America the Beautiful Fund to train printer assistants to produce a portfolio of works featuring local people. The first edition was produced in 1976 and shown in an exhibit there. The portfolio included works by professional artists assisted by the printer assistants.

Wigfall also amassed a collection of tape recordings on his life, the life experiences of Black people he met, along with the progress of the village. He made collages based on those interviews. They were part of his “audiographic” practice of interviewing ordinary people as way to preserve history and build community. His series “Things My Father Told Me” consisted of transcribed text on the effects of slavery on family histories. He was tapped to speak on "cultural excavation" during a festival by the Urban Center for Africana Affairs in Poughkeepsie, NY, in 1981.

"Communications Village was in fact Wigfall’s real art," noted one writer. The art space closed in 1983.

In 1977, Wigfall took his community involvement one step farther. He was among a group of Black protesters who confronted the Kingston police chief about what they considered the department's slow pace in finding the murderer of a 12-year-old boy. Wigfall, spokesman for the group, noted that the community wasn't looking for trouble but for a change in the city's attitude.

== Later exhibitions ==
Wigfall did not often exhibit or promote his own works. He included some pieces occasionally in shows at Communications Village, including a 1977 exhibit of prints. As a result of his choice of teaching over exhibiting, he became an overlooked artist. In 1971 when Hampton presented a one-man show of his etchings, a newspaper writer noted that this “first-rate printmaker” had been teaching in New York for a long time and few people in Richmond were familiar with his works.

Wigfall was known for his extensive African art collection, which he exhibited at Watermark/Cargo Gallery. In 1975, he organized an art show of textiles by the Design Works of Bedford-Stuyvesant in Brooklyn, NY, at the New Paltz College Art Gallery. Since 1970, the company had used African motifs in its fabrics and costumes.

His work was featured in a group show of 20 Black artists in 1978 at Spectrum IV Gallery in New Rochelle, NY. He was listed among the country's top African American artists, including Emma Amos, Benny Andrews, Camille Billops, Robert Blackburn, Vivian Brown, Edward Clark, Eldzier Cortor, Melvin Edwards, Richard Hunt, Mohammed Omer Khalil, Norman Lewis, Richard Mayhew, Stephanie Pogue, Mavis Pusey, Vincent Smith, Sharon Sutton, Betty Blayton, John Wilson and Wendy Wilson.

In 1979, he was one of 21 printmakers from Mid-Hudson Valley, Connecticut, and Westchester and Long Island, NY, to participate in the first professional invitational printmakers show sponsored by the Dutchess County Art Association in Poughkeepsie. In 1990, he was a judge in the Dutchess County Arts Council second annual armory exhibit.

In 1987, Hampton University Museum held an exhibit of 31 nationally known artists, nine of whom had graduated or taught at the college. Titled “Hampton’s Collections and Connections: Part One, Returning Home to Hampton,” it included Wigfall; Reuben V. Burrell, the school's photographer for 40 years; Joseph Gilliard; sculptor Persis Jennings, and painters John Biggers and Samella Lewis, both of whom studied under Gilliard.

In 2003, the Virginia Museum mounted an exhibit of 33 of the 60 works in its collection by African American artists, including Wigfall. Titled “Generations,” his “Chimneys” was among the group. The curator did not recognize his name, conducted some research, and discovered that he was local and African American.

In 2018, Wired Gallery in High Falls, NY, mounted an exhibit titled "The Golden Age of New Paltz," celebrating artists from the 1960s and beyond. Wigfall was one of them.

In 2019, the Midtown Arts District in Kingston held an exhibit focused on Wigfall's Watermark/Cargo Gallery. Titled “Ben Wigfall: the Artist Revealed,” the show featured artifacts from his African art collection, and his prints and paintings.

In 2021, he was in a group show focused on Cinque Gallery, founded in 1969 in New York by Romare Bearden, Ernest Crichlow and Norman Lewis as a place for Black artists to exhibit and feed off each other's talent. Titled “Creating Community, Cinque Gallery Artists,” Wigfall was named along with the country's foremost artists associated with the gallery.

Back where he started, Wigfall was featured in his first retrospective in a collaborative exhibit by the Virginia Museum of Fine Arts and the Samuel Dorsky Museum of Art at SUNY New Paltz. Titled "Ben Wigfall and Communications Village,” its first stop was in New Paltz in 2022, followed by Virginia in 2023. The exhibit consisted of his early paintings, assemblages, collages and prints, as well as his audiographic works. There were also prints created by artists and students/community people at Communications Village, and artworks by various artists. On its third stop, the exhibit traveled to the Mary M. Torggler Fine Arts Center at Christopher Newport University in Newport News, VA, where it was held in conjunction with Hampton University.

In 2024, Wigfall's work as a photographer was exhibited along with those of his protege Sharon VanDyke at two sites in the city of Kingston. The exhibits featured slides from photos shot by Wigfall and VanDyke as they wandered the city in the 1970s photographing its African American citizens.

In 2023, the Ogden Museum of Southern Art in New Orleans included him in a group show titled “Knowing Who We Are.” The pieces were pulled largely from the museum's collection. Wigfall was among a category of artists whose works showed a sense of place.

== Death ==
Wigfall died on Feb. 9, 2017, a week after the Virginia Museum hosted the first of two lectures on his life and work.

== Selected exhibitions ==
- Virginia Highlands Festival of Arts, Crafts and Antiques, Abingdon (Virginia Museum traveling show), 1951
- Hollins (VA) College (work on loan from Virginia Museum), 1952
- Bridgewater (VA) College (work on loan from Virginia Museum), 1952
- State University of Iowa, 1954
- Clark Gallery, Richmond, VA, 1955, 1956
- Sweetbriar Women's College, Sweetbriar, VA (one-man show), 1957
- National Rehabilitation Service Exhibition, Washington, 1950s
- Yale University Graphics Department (one-man show), (circa 1954)
- Addison Gallery, Andover, MA
- Twentieth Century Gallery, Williamsburg, VA, 1963
- Hampton Institute (University) Museum, 1993 (one-man show)
- Jewish Community Center of Newport News (Virginia Museum traveling show), 1966
- Elizabeth City (NC) State College, 1968
- Lever House, New York City, 1969
- Saratoga Performing Arts Center gallery, NY, 1970
- Pennsylvania State University, 1978
- Schomburg Center for Research in Black Culture, 1985
- Kingston Center of SUNY Ulster, 2018
- Kingston (NY) City Hall, 2020
- Duke Hall Gallery of Fine Art, James Madison University, 2021

== Selected collections ==
- Virginia Museum of Fine Arts
- Hampton University Museum
- Yale University Art Gallery
