= Alena Varmužová =

Czech mathematician (1939-1997)

Alena Varmužová (24 April 1939 – 7 August 1997) was a Czech mathematician. She was specialized in creating teaching systems for mathematics education of young students.

== Life and work ==
Alena Varmužová was born on 24 April 1939 in Rožnov pod Radhoštěm. She graduated from the Faculty of Science in Olomouc, having completed the coursework for mathematics and descriptive geometry. Then she enrolled in the Pedagogical Institute in Ostrava where she earned the title Doctor of Natural Sciences (1975), in 1988 she defended her candidate's thesis Content definition of the didactic system of mathematical preparation of preschool children, which dealt with designing systems to effectively teach mathematics to young students.

In 1990, she was appointed associate professor for mathematics didactics at the Faculty of Education of the University of Ostrava, and she became head of the Department of Mathematics Didactics. She worked at the Union of Czech mathematicians and physicists.

Varmužová authored the section of a textbook for secondary schools that was titled Reasoning Education - Mathematical Concepts. In 1991 she published her book, Mathematics for Preschool Children.

Varmužová died on 7 August 1997 at the age of 58. Her husband was the sculptor Vratislav Varmuža.
