= Mavis Pusey =

Jamaican-born American abstract artist (1928–2019)

- Born: Mavis Iona Pusey; September 17, 1928; Retreat, Jamaica
- Died: April 20, 2019 (aged 90); Falmouth, Virginia, U.S.
- Education: Traphagen School of Fashion, Art Students League of New York
- Occupations: painter, printmaker, teacher
- Movement: abstract
- Children: 1
- Website: mavispusey.com

Mavis Iona Pusey (September 17, 1928 – April 20, 2019) was a Jamaican-born American abstract artist. She was a printmaker and painter who was well known for her hard-edge, nonrepresentational images. Pusey drew inspirations from urban construction. She was a leading abstractionist and made works inspired by the constantly changing landscape.

== Biography ==
Pusey was born on September 17, 1928, in Retreat, Jamaica, Her parents died when she was born. At the age of 9, Pusey learned how to sew and make dresses from her aunt. Her first job was at a clothing factory in Kingston.

At age 18, Pusey moved to New York City to pursue a fashion design degree at Traphagen School of Fashion. After a couple of years of financial difficulties Pusey left school and worked at a bridal boutique. She then enrolled in fine art courses at the Art Students League of New York, an institution that worked with her work schedule and allowed her to financially support herself. At this institution Pusey earned a scholarship from the Ford Foundation and was allowed to take courses and study under artists like artists Harry Sternberg and Will Barnet, a painter and printmaker. She told The New York Amsterdam News in 1978, "Accidentally, I went into Will Barnet’s class of painting. After a month I said, ‘I think I’m in the wrong class.’ But by this time I had become so involved in my painting, I just stayed."

After four years of study at the League, when her student visa expired, Pusey moved to England to live with her two brothers in London and continued her education. In London, she worked as pattern maker for Singer Corporation. There she met Birgit Skiöld, a Swedish printmaker and modern artist.

After spending a year in Paris in 1968, Pusey returned to New York City in 1969. She started working with Robert Blackburn and during this time created –Broken construction at Noon (c. 1970), Decaying Construction (c. 1970), and Impact on Vibration (1968).

At age 60, in 1988, a new owner purchased the building she had lived in for 16 years in the Chelsea neighborhood. Whereas many other tenants willingly left, Pusey held out, the landlord tried cutting off the electricity to push her out, and eventually paid her to leave. Pusey relocated to Orange, Virginia, where she taught painting at the Woodberry Forest School. At the time she was one of four women on faculty and the only Black faculty.

In 2011, Pusey's health had declined and pieces of her art were auctioned off in a bankruptcy proceeding to support her care. She was put under the guardianship of the Orange County Department of Social Services. She died on April 20, 2019, in Falmouth, Virginia, at the age of 90. Pusey is survived by her daughter Yvonne Palmer. Her works still live on in numerous collections throughout the United States.

== Career ==
In 1968, Pusey moved to Paris and had her first solo exhibition in Galerie Louis Soulanges in Paris, France. While living in Paris, Pusey witnessed the 1968 student riots that would inspire many of her works and her most noteworthy print, Paris Mai Juin (1968). Pusey returned to the U.S. and her work was featured in a 1971 major group exhibition titled Contemporary Black Artists in America at the Whitney Museum of American Art. One of the works from the 1971 exhibit, a large-scale painting Dejygea (1970), was among those also included in a 2017 exhibit, Magnetic Fields: Expanding American Abstraction, 1960s to Today, at Kemper Museum of Contemporary Art.

During the 1970s, she participated in a community art space called Communications Village operated by printmaker Benjamin Leroy Wigfall in Kingston, NY. Andrews made prints with the help of printer assistants who had been taught printmaking by Wigfall.

Pusey also became a teacher and taught at may places, including The New School, the Pennsylvania Academy of the Fine Arts, and Rutgers University. In 1988, Pusey moved to Orange, Virginia and began teaching at Woodberry Forest School, an all-boys boarding school.

Pusey's works are held in the permanent collections of the Cochran Collection in LaGrange, Georgia, the Birmingham Museum of Art in Alabama, the Studio Museum in Harlem and the Museum of Modern Art in New York, and the National Museum of African American History and Culture in Washington, D.C.

Pusey received awards and grants from the Pollock-Krasner Foundation and The Louis Comfort Tiffany Foundation, during her career.

== Artistic development and influences ==
Pusey drew a lot of her inspiration from the constantly changing landscape of urban construction. A lot of her works were inspired by scenes of urban demolition and construction in the city. She gave her works titles like "Broken Construction at Dusk" and "Demolishment". Pusey had a great interest in design that led to her use of geometric lines and works like, Solitude, a work she created in 1963.

She had her first solo exhibition at Gallarie Louis Soulanges in 1968. In 1971, her work, Dejygea (1970), was featured in an exhibition titled Contemporary Black Artists in America at the Whitney Museum of American Art. this same work has been featured in a 2017 exhibit, Magnetic Fields: Expanding American Abstraction, the 1960s to today, at the Kemper Museum of Contemporary Art. It traveled to places like Washington DC's National Museum of Women in the Arts to the Museum of Fine Arts in St. Petersburg, Florida. Pusey says that color sets the "tempo" of her work, while the design is the "backbone" of her work.

The inaugural art exhibition at the National Museum of African American History and Culture (NMAAHC) in Washington D.C. featured Pusey.

In 2025, the Institute of Contemporary Art at the University of Pennsylvania held an exhibition of her work titled, “Mavis Pusey: Mobile Images.” The exhibit featured works from her 50 year career.

== Collections ==
Pusey has works in many different collections in museums across the United States, Including:

- Birmingham Museum of Art, Birmingham, Alabama
- Cleveland Museum of Art, Cleveland, Ohio
- Detroit Institute of Arts (DIA), Detroit, Michigan
- Grand Rapids Art Museum, Grand Rapids, Michigan
- Museum of Modern Art (MoMA), Manhattan, New York
- National Gallery of Art (NGA), Washington D.C.
- Sheldon Museum of Art in Lincoln, Nebraska
- Smithsonian American Art Museum, Washington D.C.
- The Studio Museum in Harlem, New York
- Tougaloo College in Tougaloo, Mississippi
