= Leo Katz (artist) =

American artist

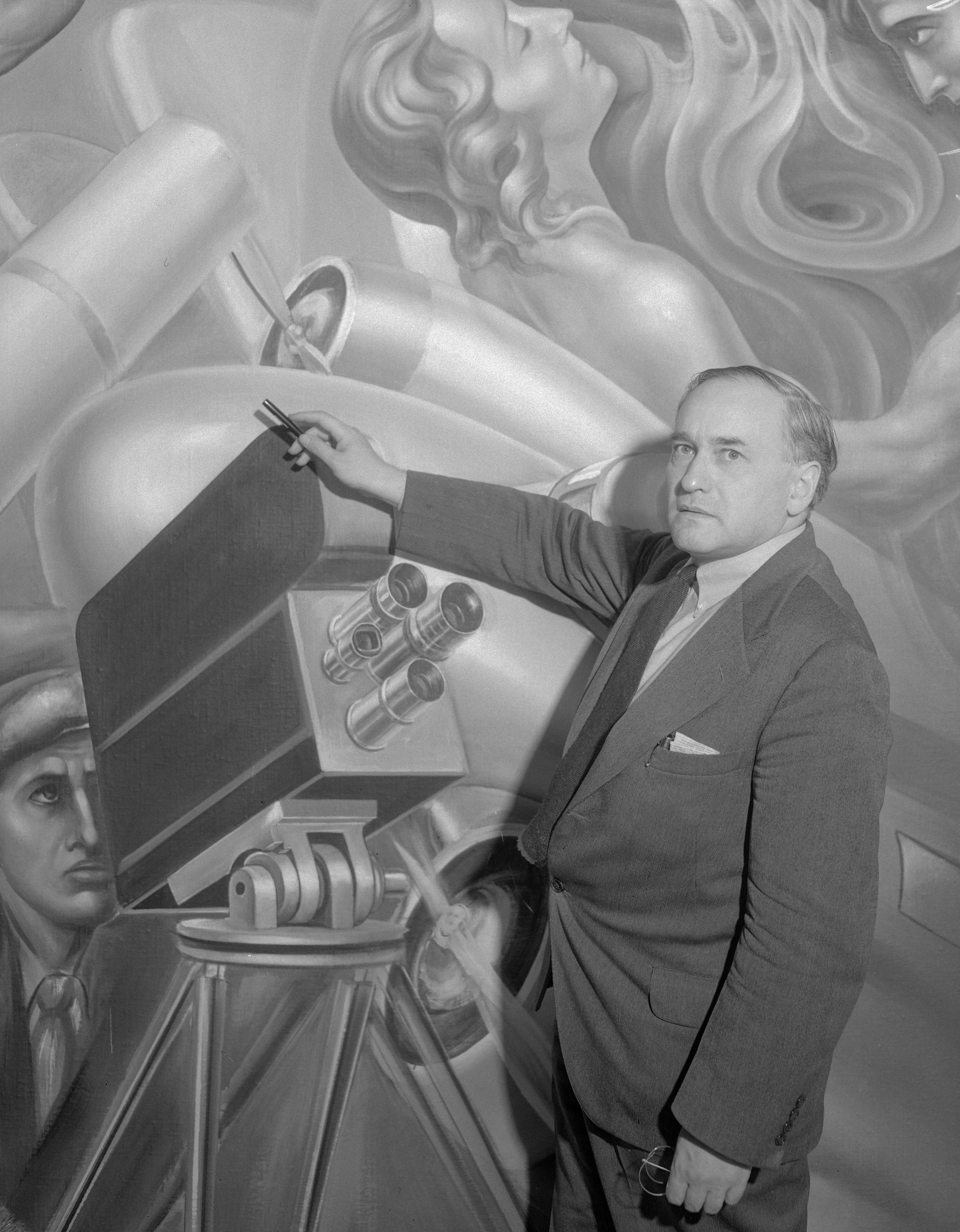
- Leo Katz with a portion of one of his murals
- Born: December 30, 1887; Roznau, Moravia
- Died: 1982 (aged 94–95); Bronx, New York
- Known for: painting, murals, printmaking
- Website: leokatz.com

Leo Katz (December 30, 1887 – 1982) was an American painter, muralist, printmaker, and photographer.

== Biography ==
Katz was born on December 30, 1887, in Roznau, Moravia. He studied at the Academy of Fine Arts Vienna and the Academy of Fine Arts, Munich.

In 1920 he emigrated to New York. In 1934 he moved to Los Angeles. There he painted a mural for the Federal Art Project in the Frank Wiggins Trade School which was subsequently removed because of its objectionable content. Katz also created a mural for the 1933 Century of Progress Chicago World's Fair, as well as assisting the muralist José Clemente Orozco on the frescos at Dartmouth College. In 1940s Katz returned to New York where he focused on printmaking, working at the Atelier 17 studio. He produced prints there and became involved with the management of the Atelier when the owner, Stanley William Hayter returned to Paris. In 1960 he wrote a history of Atelier 17 that appeared in Print, America's Graphic Design Magazine in the January-February edition.

Katz's career as an educator include teaching a course on Modern art at the Metropolitan Museum of Art and courses on photography at Spelman College. He was chair of the art department at the historically Black Hampton Institute in the early 1950s where he taught 20-year-old student Benjamin Leroy Wigfall, who in 1951 was the youngest person whose artwork was purchased by the Virginia Museum of Fine Arts.

Katz died in November of 1982 in New York. Katz's work is included in the collections of the Art Institute of Chicago, The Metropolitan Museum of Art, the Museum of Modern Art, the National Gallery of Art,

Katz's papers are in the Archives of American Art at the Smithsonian Institution.
