= Wallachian Open Air Museum =

Ethnographic museum in Rožnov pod Radhoštěm, Czech Republic

- Valašské muzeum v přírodě
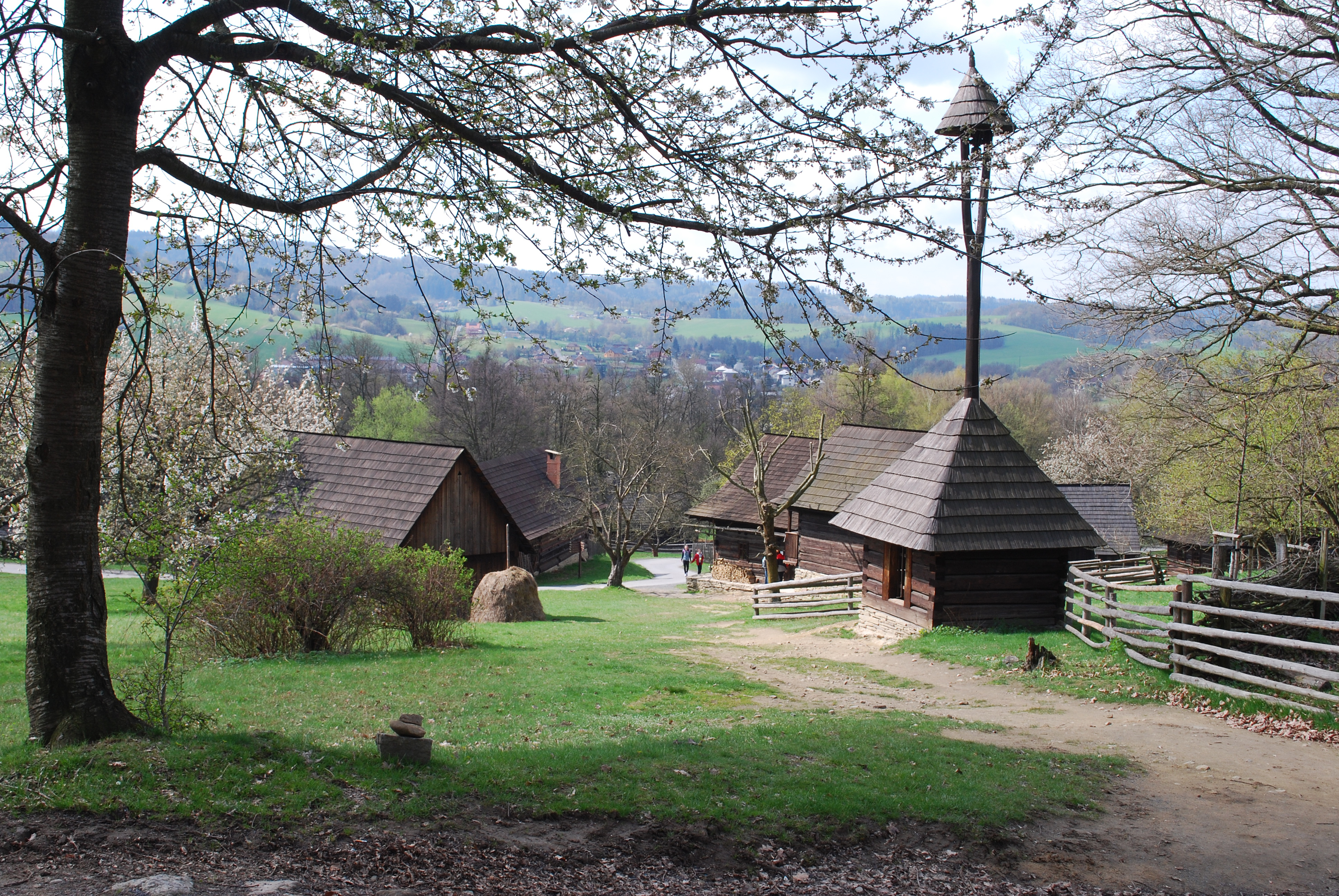
- Established: 1925
- Location: Rožnov pod Radhoštěm, Czech Republic
- Coordinates: 49.461°N 18.154°E
- Type: Open-air museum; ethnographic museum
- Collections: Wallachian material culture
- Founder: Bohumír Jaroněk
- Website: www.vmp.cz

The Wallachian Open Air Museum (Czech: Valašské muzeum v přírodě) is an open-air museum in Rožnov pod Radhoštěm in the Zlín Region of the Czech Republic. The museum is devoted to preserving and displaying Moravian Wallachian material culture and traditions. It is the second oldest, and the largest open air museum in the country.

The museum consists of three independent parts: the Little Wooden Town, the Wallachian Village and the Water Mill Valley. It is a listed national monument in the Czech Republic.

== History ==
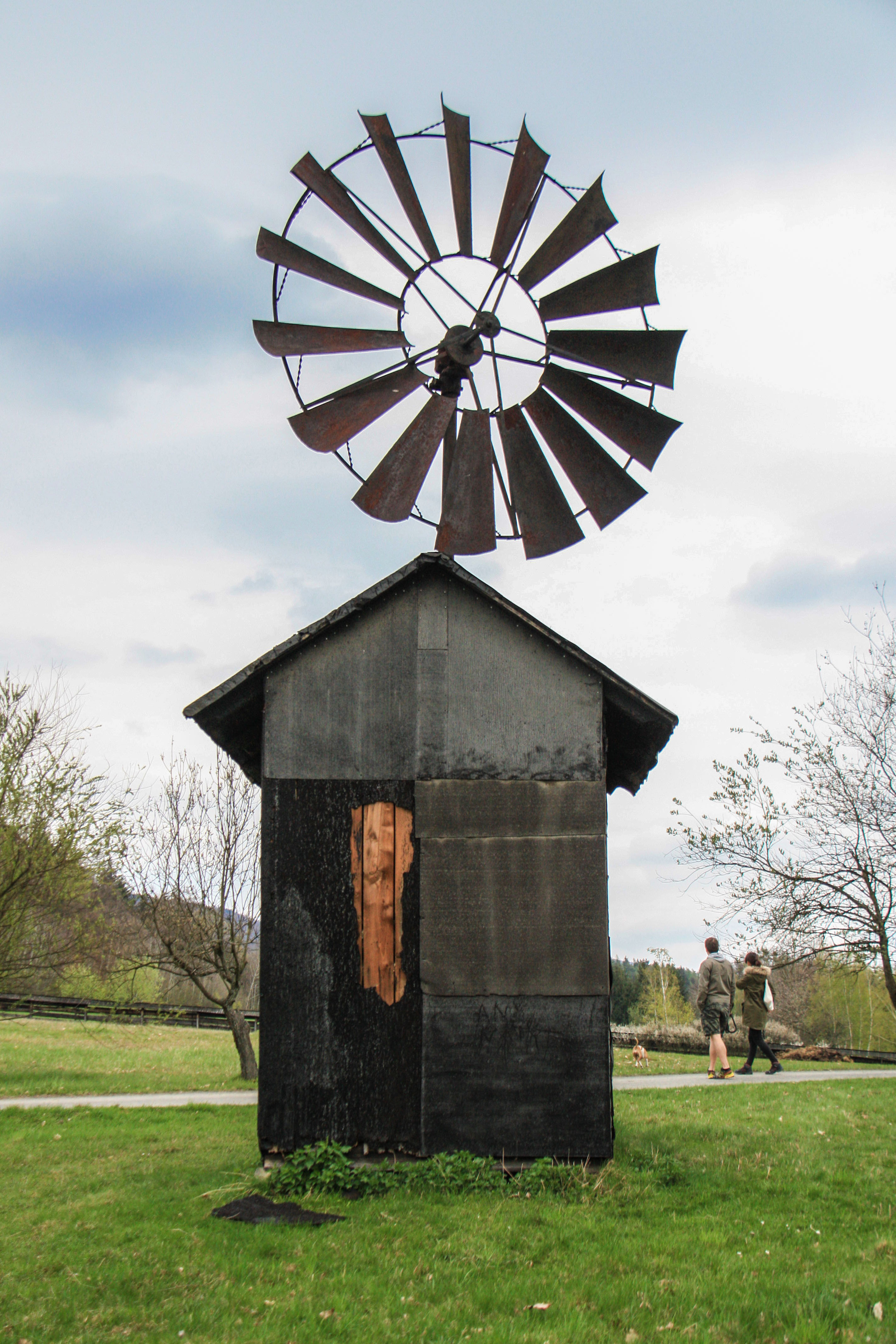
A mill in the museum

The museum was established by the Jaroněk brothers, who came from a working-class family of craftsmen and makers. Bohumír Jaroněk, a skilled painter and graphic artist, developed a particular interest in Wallachian timbered cottages. In 1895 he visited the Ethnological Czech-Slav Exhibition in Prague, where he has seen an open-air exhibition of Wallachian buildings. In 1909 the Jaroněk brothers settled in Rožnov, and shortly afterwards Alois Jaroněk travelled to the first open air museum in the world, the Stockholm Skansen.

Between 1911 and 1925 the brothers have been developing the concept of opening an open air museum in Rožnov and making it a reality. In 1925, during a folklore festival called "Wallachian year", the museum was opened. At that point it contained two large houses – the town hall and an 18th-century townhouse – and several smaller buildings. Gradually more buildings have been added to the complex.

During World War II a group of carpenters under Michal Fabián erected a wooden church, using plans of the church in Větřkovice near Příbor which had burned down in 1878. The original part of the museum has later become dubbed the Little Wooden Town.

The second part of the museum, the Wallachian Village, was gradually built in the 1960s. This part represents a typical Wallachian village and consists of approximately 40 buildings. The third division - the Watermill Valley - was opened in the 1980s and consists of several mills and other structures representing the work and manufacture carried out in the villages, allowing the visitors to get acquainted with the traditional methods of production and working conditions.

== Divisions ==
=== Little Wooden Town ===
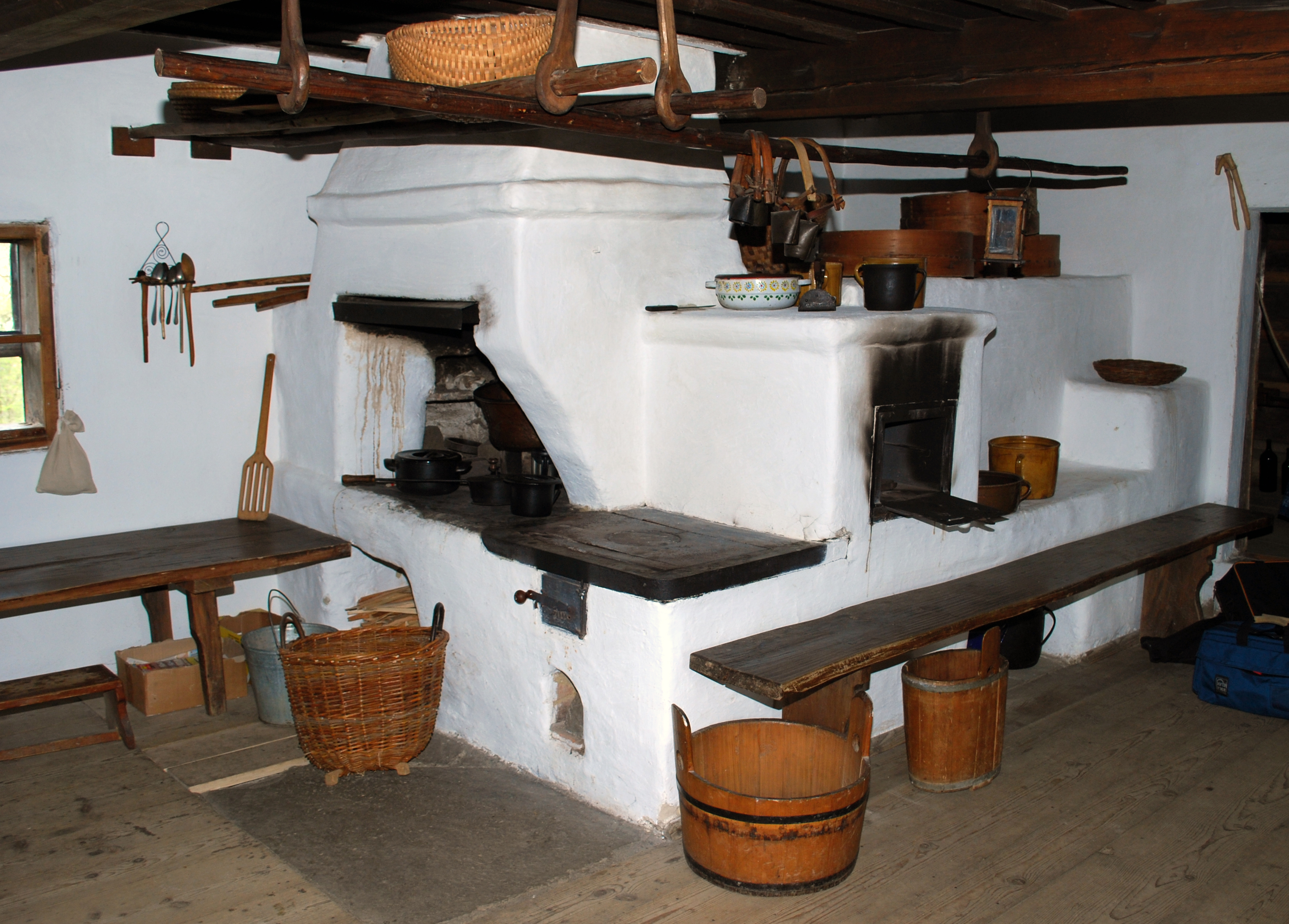
Farmstead from Karolinka

The Little Wooden Town presents the traditional vernacular Moravian municipal architecture of the late 19th and early 20th centuries, and contains both relocated original buildings and reconstructions. The interiors have also been reconstructed to represent the traditional dwellings and institutions. The Little Wooden Town was brought into existence by moving several traditional stave houses from Rožnov Square into the present-day museum area, including the wooden Town Hall. Gradually new buildings were added including Vašek's Pub, the Mayor's House from Velké Kralovice and Church of St. Anne.

=== Wallachian Village ===
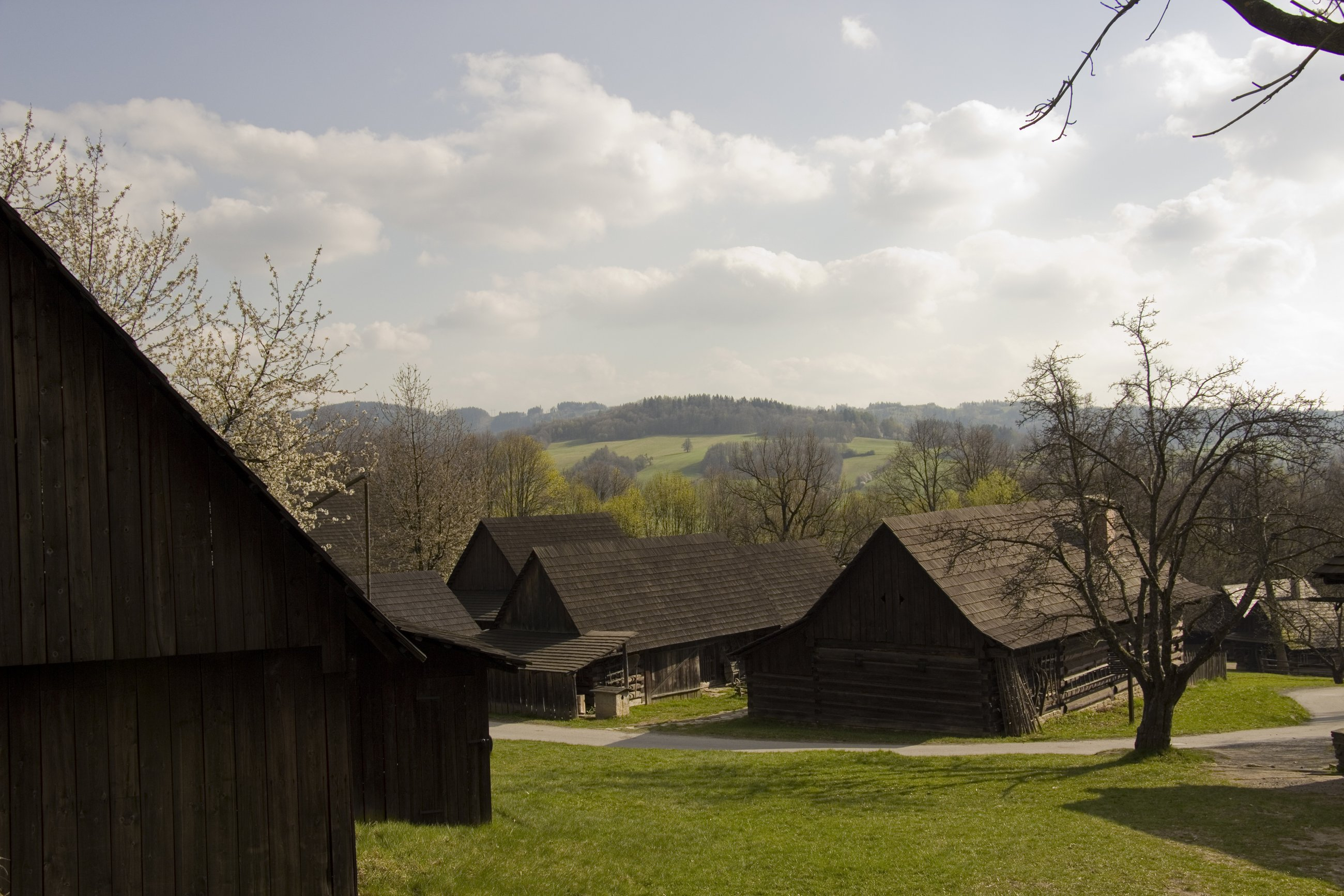
Wallachian Village

The Wallachian Village is the largest of the three parts of the museum. It consists of numerous farmsteads, wells, gardens, bell towers, windmills and other village structures placed among roads, trees and other landscape elements characteristic for traditional Wallachian villages. The Wallachian Village was established in order to preserve the traditional stave and timbered houses which were likely to be irreparably damaged if left in their original environment. More buildings were added later, originating mostly from Moravian Wallachia.

Within the Wallachian Village, farm animals are bred, most notably the "valaška" sheep and goats; plants and farm products are cultivated in local fields. This contributes to the reconstruction being a complete representation of life in the village, the life of which had to follow the rhythms of the seasons and nature.

=== Water Mill Valley ===
The Water Mill Valley is the newest division of the museum. It serves to present the machinery, work and technical skills of workers making everyday life in the village possible. This part of the museum contains a Wool Mill, Water Mill and Saw Mill originating from Velké Karlovice, Podťatý Valley. Other structures include the Oil crusher, the Smithy, and the Iron Mill.

== Gallery ==
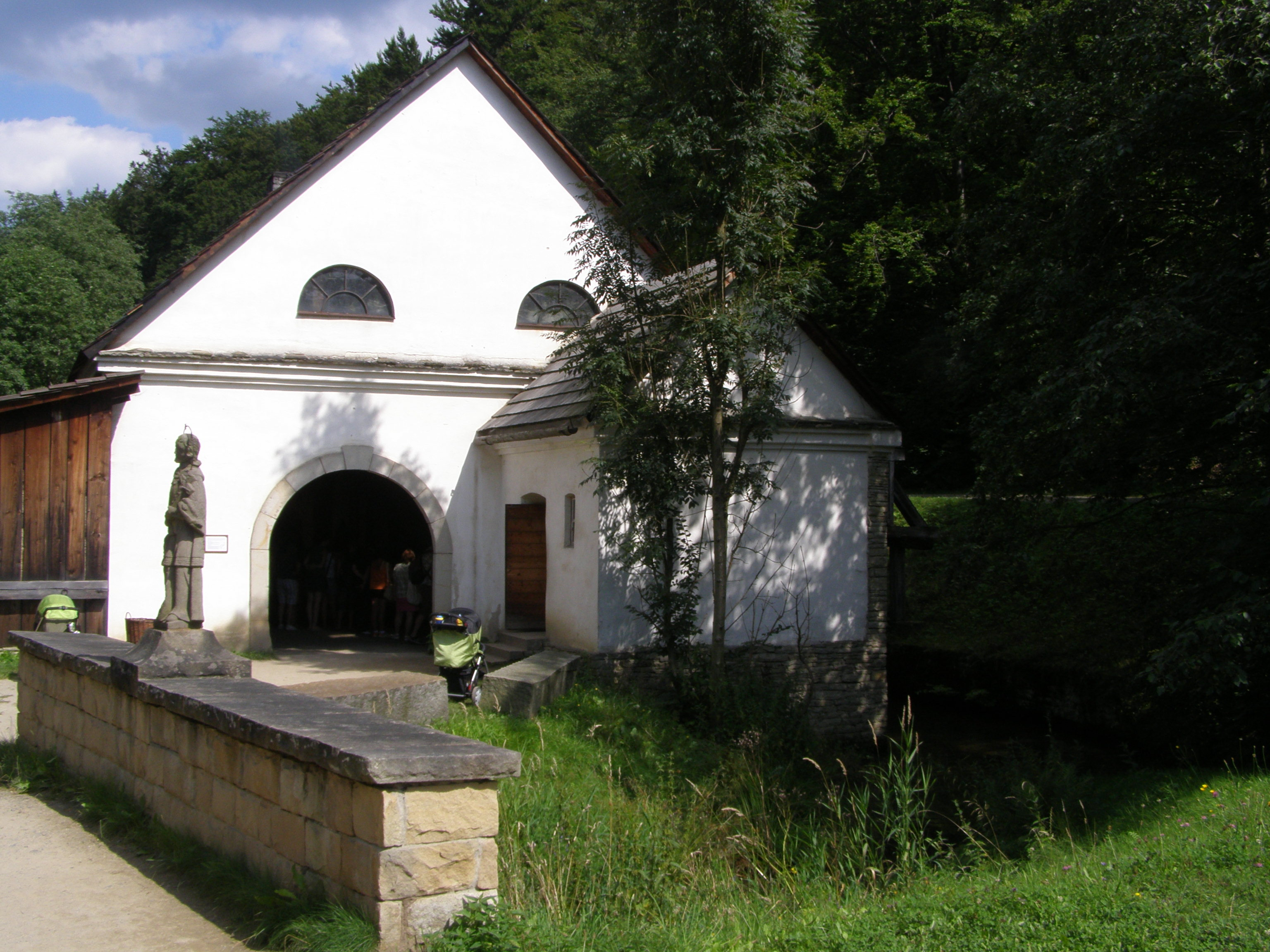
Hammer mill in Water Mill Valley

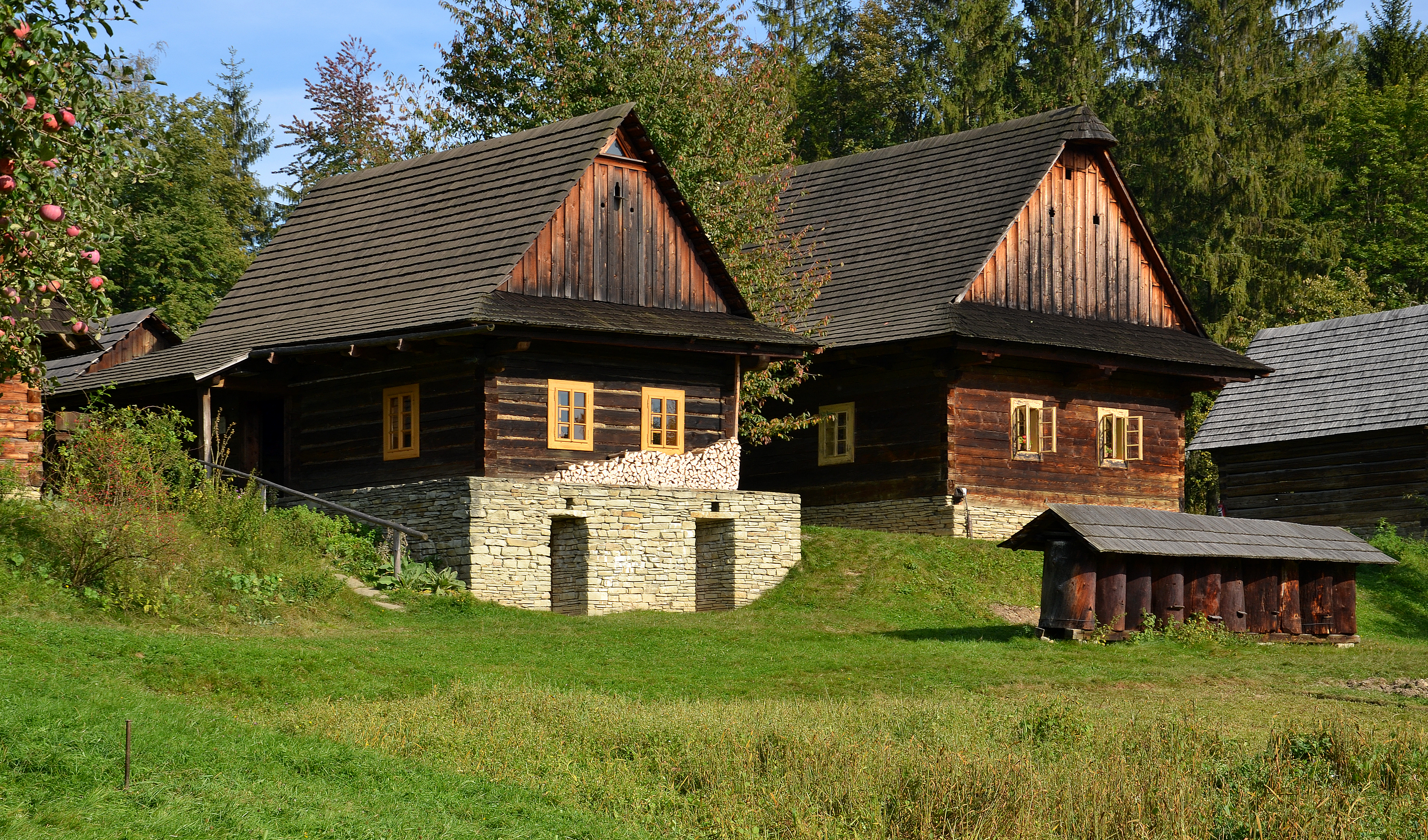
Farmsteads in Wallachian Village

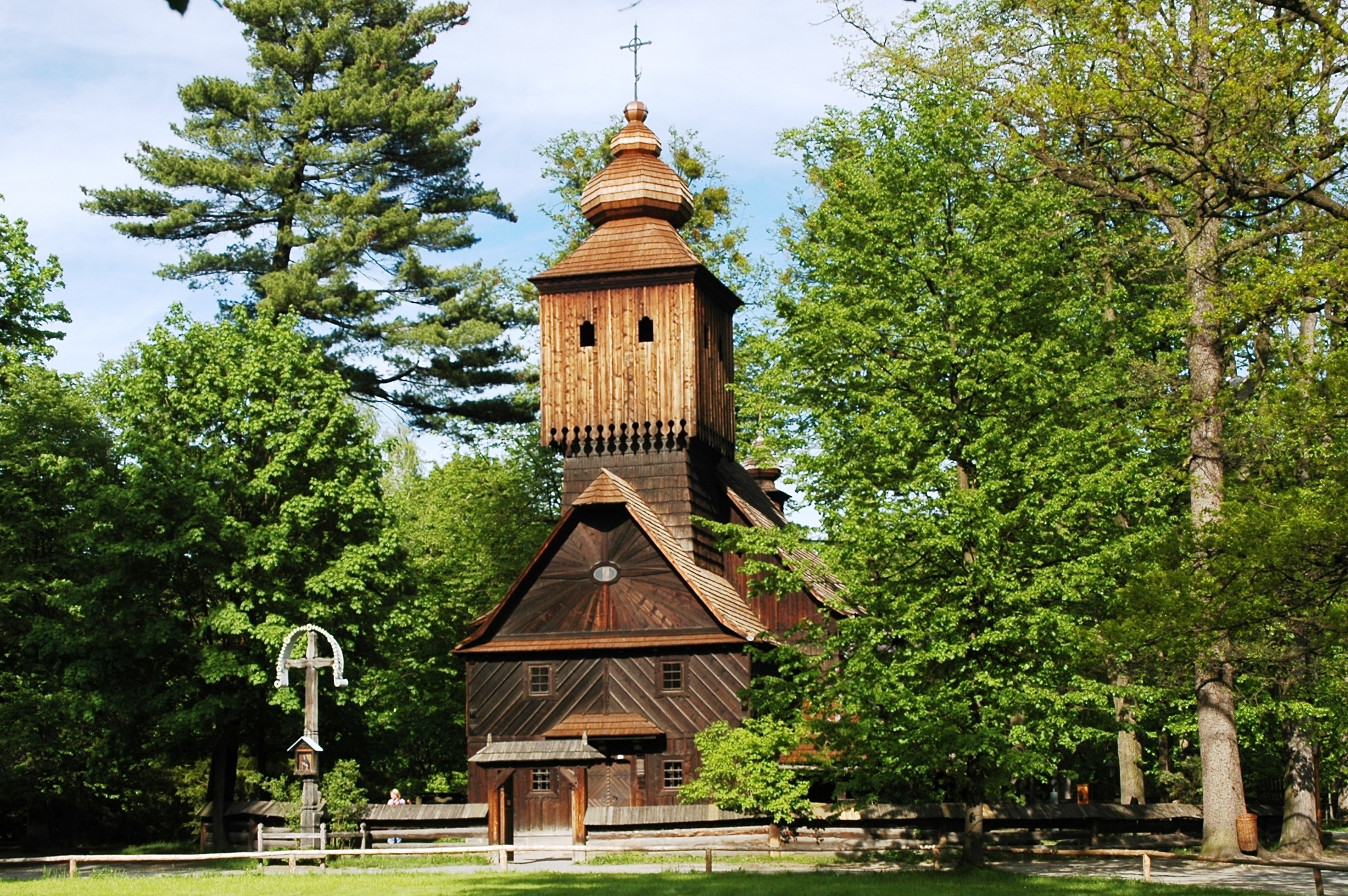
Church of Saint Anne

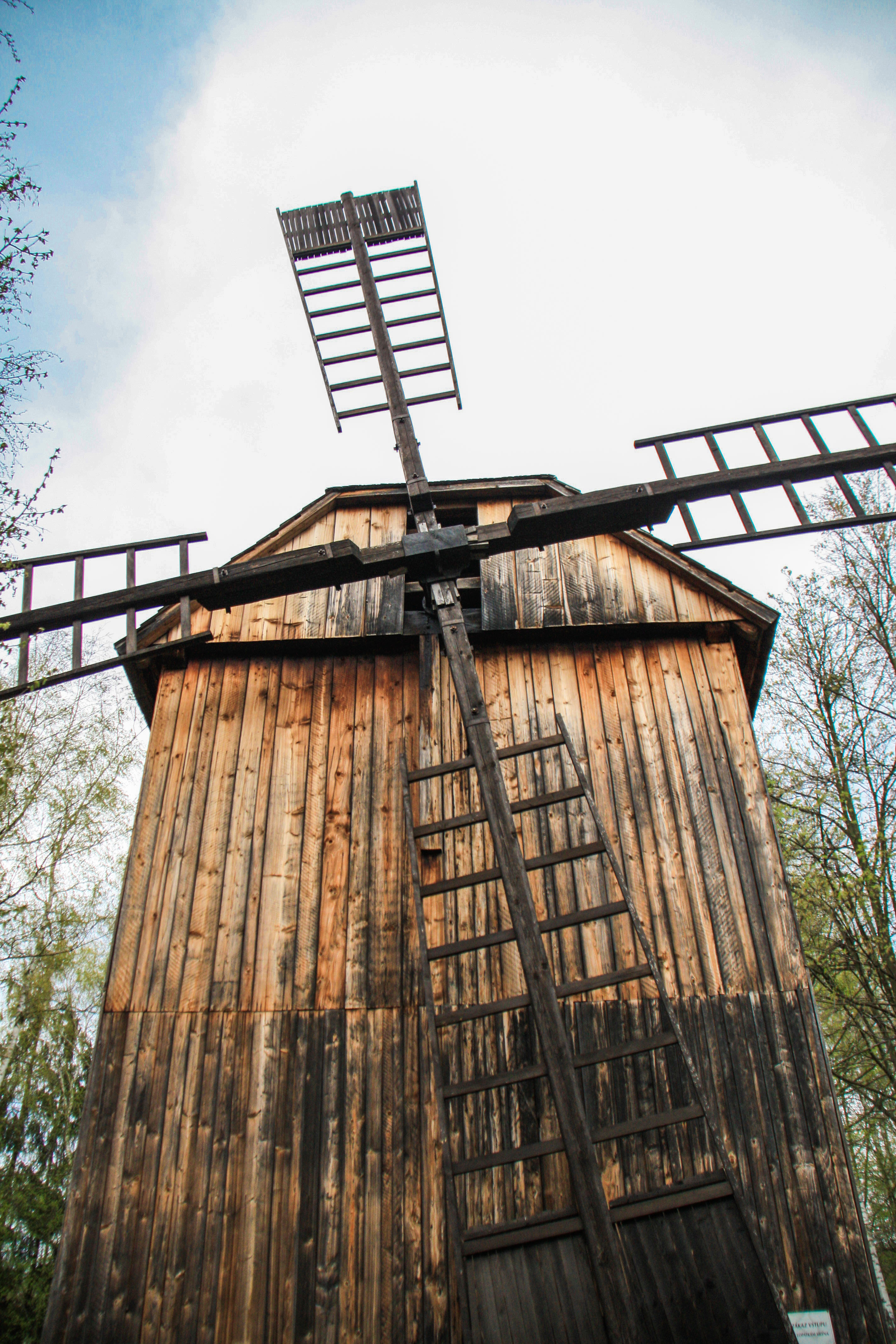

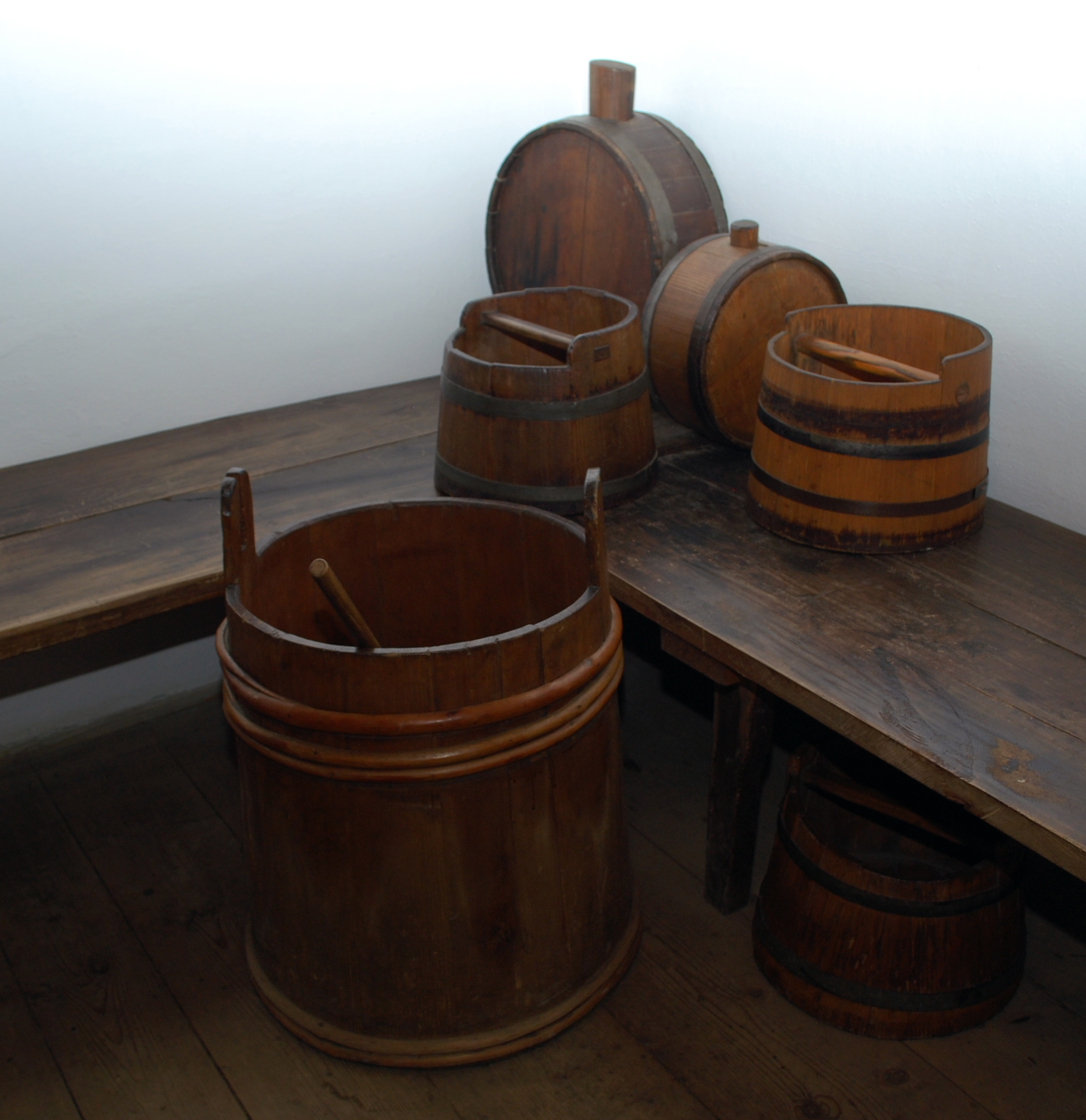

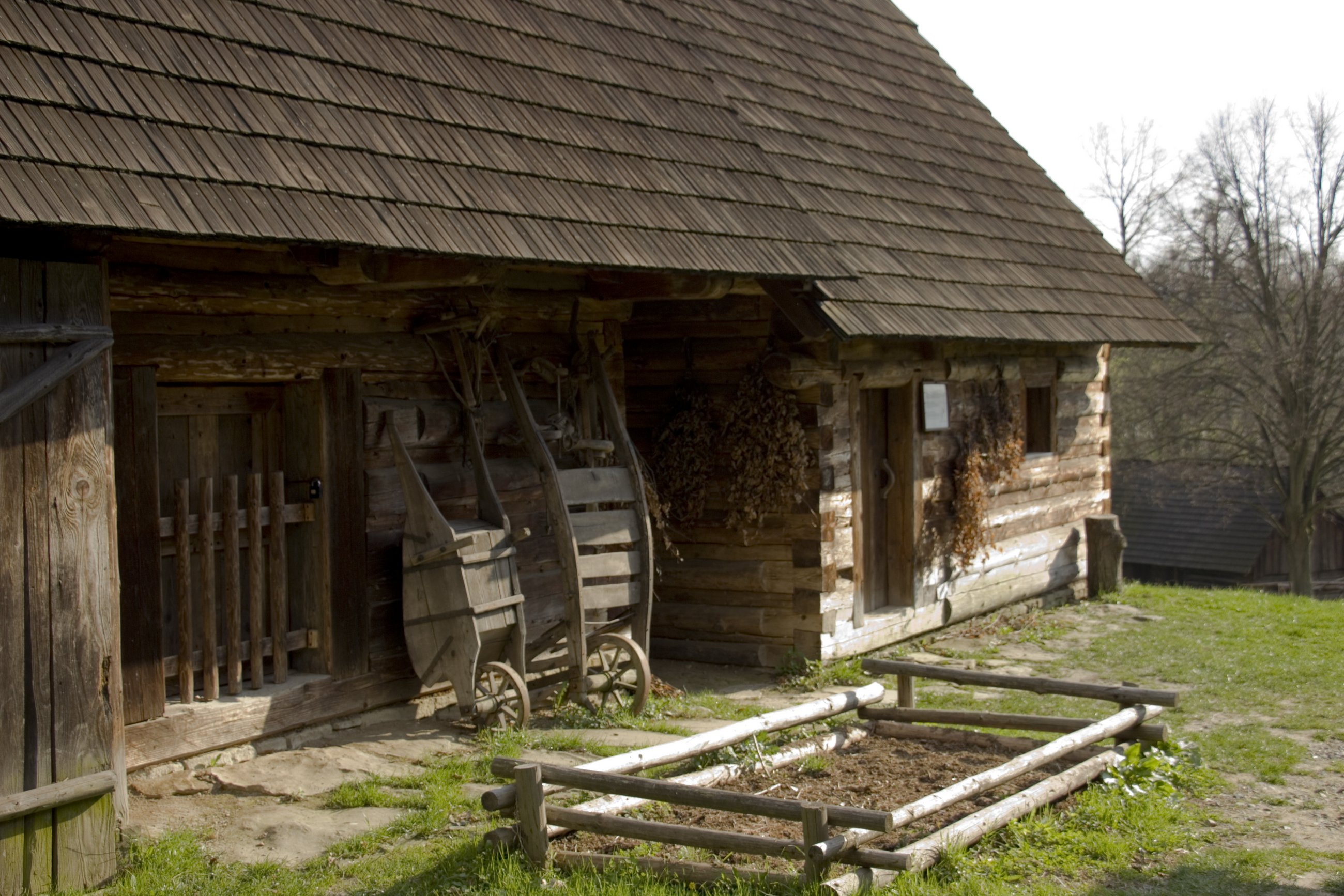

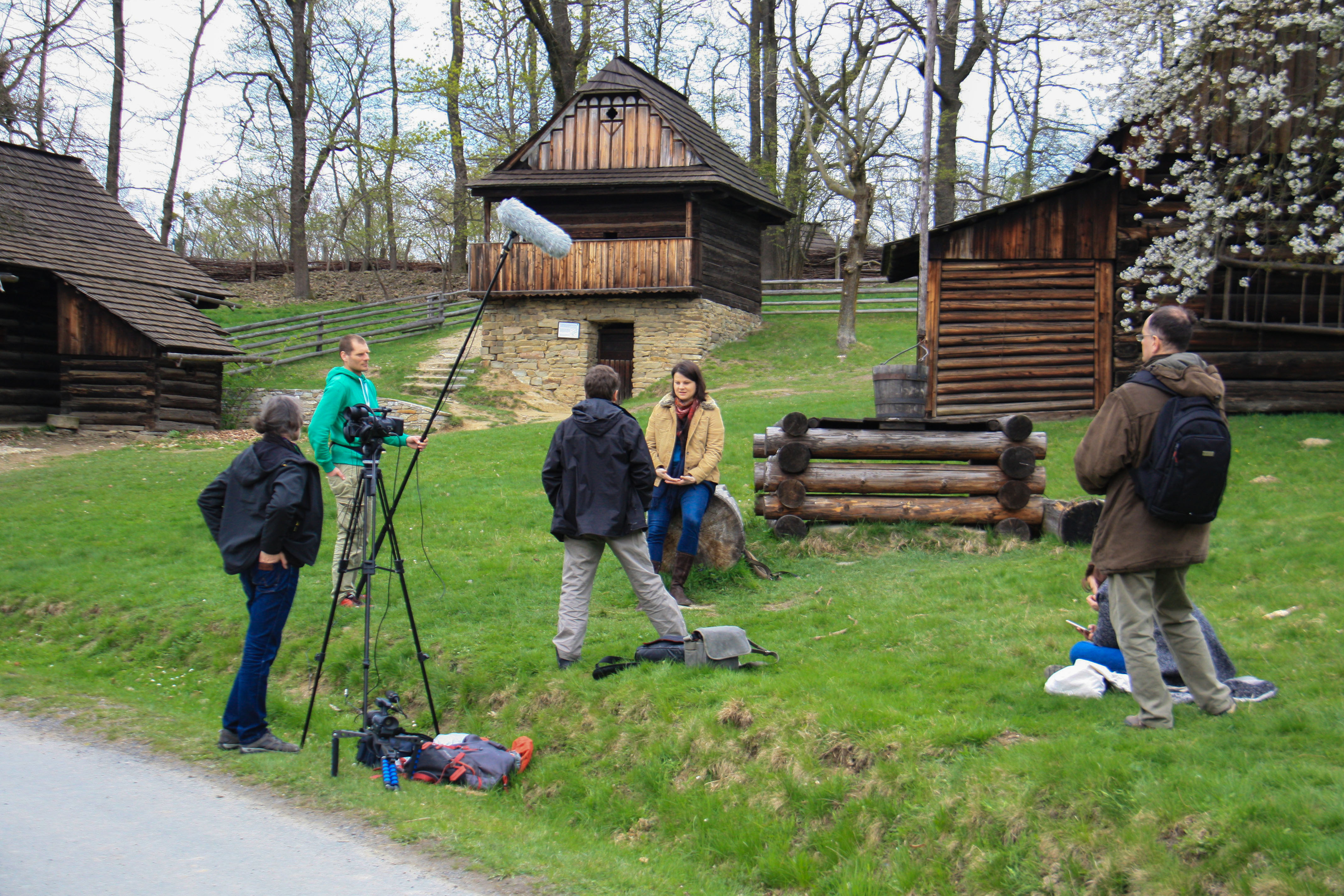
Interview with an ethnographer
