= Sharon E. Sutton =

American architect

Sharon Egretta Sutton
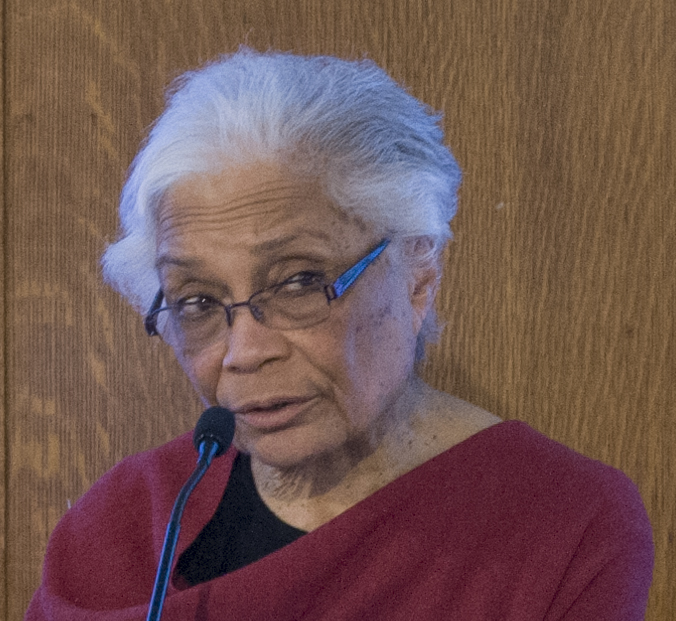

Academic background
- Education: Manhattan School of Music, University of Hartford; Columbia University, City University of New York

Academic work
- Discipline: Architecture
- Institutions: Pratt Institute, Columbia University, University of Cincinnati, University of Michigan, University of Washington

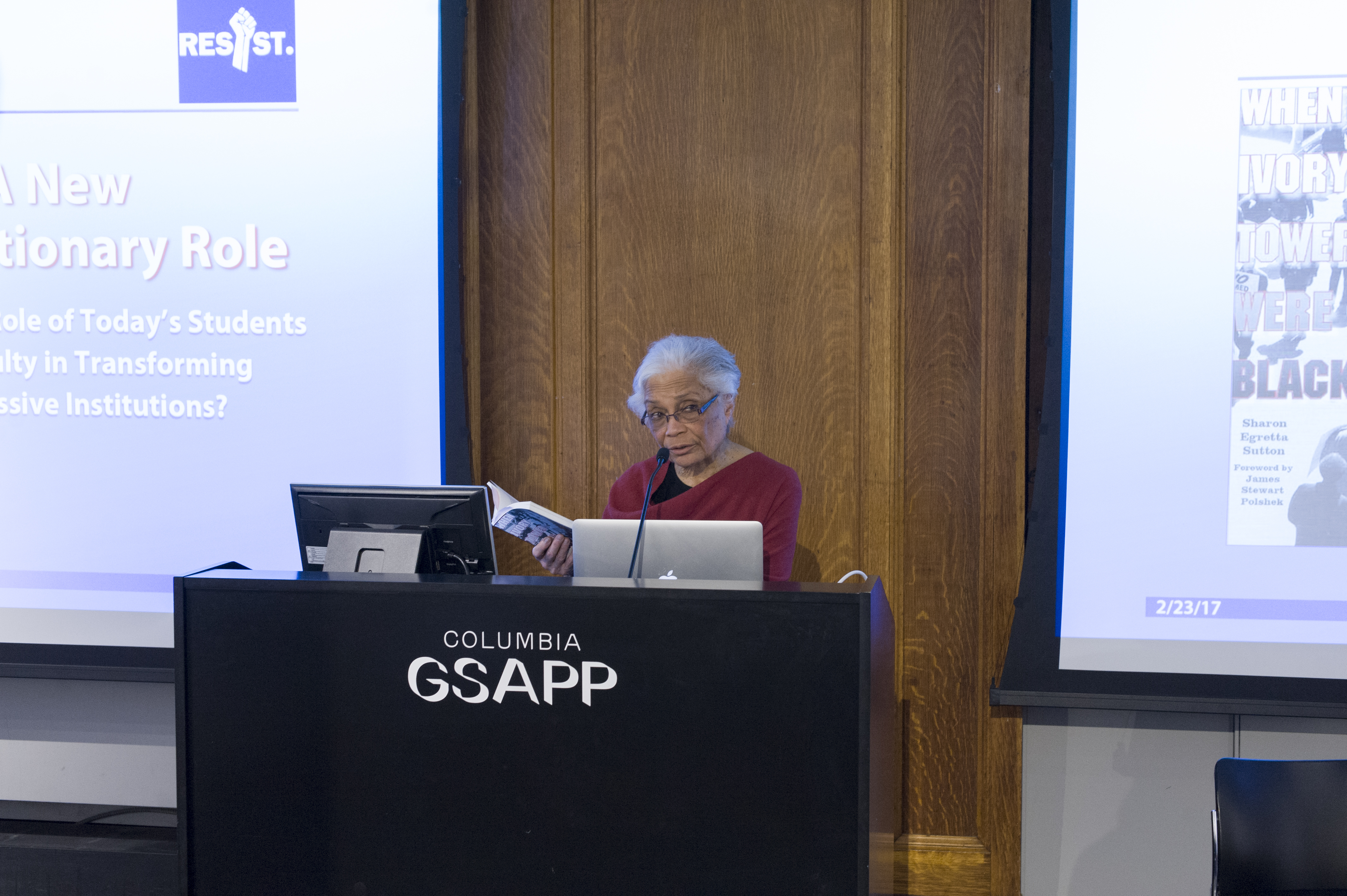
Sharon Egretta Sutton in 2017 at the launch of her book, When Ivory Towers were Black at the book's launch at Columbia University

Sharon Egretta Sutton (born 1941), is an American architect, educator, visual artist, and author. Her work is focused on community-based participatory research and design. She is a professor emerita at the University of Washington. In 1984, she became the first African American woman to become a full professor in an accredited architectural degree program while teaching at the University of Michigan. She has also taught at Parsons School of Design, and Columbia University.

== Early life and education ==
Sharon Egretta Sutton was born in 1941 in Cincinnati, Ohio. Sutton began taking piano lessons at age 5 from the organist at her mother's church at a time when colored people were barred from going to the swimming pool, skating rink, and movie theater in her segregated Cincinnati neighborhood. She was introduced to the French horn at her college prep high school where all students had to study one of the arts alongside their academic courses.

Sutton was educated initially in music, studying French horn with Gunther Schuller first at the Manhattan School of Music in 1959; and latter at the Hartt College of Music at the University of Hartford, where she received a B.A. degree in 1963. After earning a degree in 1963, Sutton worked as a professional musician in New York City, most notably for Sol Hurok Attractions and in the original cast of Man of La Mancha. She also performed at symphony orchestras, in Radio City Music Hall, on Broadway, and had over a thousand performances in Man of La Mancha.

In 1967, Sutton enrolled in Parsons School of Design. She later studied architecture at Columbia University, where she was mentored by J. Max Bond, Jr. and Romaldo Giurgola. She earned her M.Arch. in 1973 and opened a private practice in 1976. In 1982, she received her MPhil and Ph.D. in psychology from the City University of New York (CUNY).

== Career ==
=== Teaching and writing ===
Sutton's focus is community-based participatory research and design with a special emphasis on low-income and minority youth and other disenfranchised populations. Her research has been funded by the Ford Foundation, National Endowment for the Arts, W.K. Kellogg Foundation, Hewlett Foundation, Tukwila School District, the University of Michigan, and University of Washington, among others.

She is a distinguished visiting professor at Parsons School of Design, an adjunct professor at Columbia University, and professor emerita at the University of Washington where she served on the faculty 1998 to 2016.

Sutton is author of When Ivory Towers Were Black: A Story about Race in America's Cities and Universities (2017); Weaving a Tapestry of Resistance: The Places, Power and Poetry of a Sustainable Society (1996); and Learning through the Built Environment (1985). Additionally, she is author of numerous book chapters and journal articles, and is co-editor of The Paradox of Urban Space: Inequality and Transformation in Marginalized Communities.

Sutton is also a noted printmaker and collagist, having studied graphic art. Her work has been exhibited in and collected by galleries and museums, business enterprises, colleges, and universities, and is part of the Robert Blackburn Collection at the Library of Congress.

Dedicated to improving the living environments of disenfranchised populations, Sutton is currently ethnographic consultant to design studio instructors at Parsons School of Design. Most of Sutton's scholarship explores America's continuing struggle for racial justice.

=== Architecture ===
A registered architect, Sutton was the twelfth African American woman to be licensed to practice architecture (1976), the first to be promoted to full professor of architecture (1994), and the second to be elected a Fellow of the American Institute of Architects (FAIA) and honored as a Distinguished Professor by the Association of Collegiate Schools of Architecture (ACSA) in 1995-1996. Sutton received the "Life Recognition Award" from the Michigan Women's Hall of Fame in 1997 and the national American Institute of Architects Whitney M. Young, Jr., Award in 2011. In 2014 and 2017 respectively, she received the AIA Seattle Chapter Medal of Honor and the AIA New York Medal of Honor, the highest awards chapters can confer.

Sutton's career as an architect started after she was licensed by New York State as an architect. She started practicing architecture and fine art in a 5th Avenue loft and also started teaching at Pratt Institute and later at Columbia University.

Sutton left Columbia University for the University of Cincinnati before she was recruited to the University of Michigan where she became the first African American woman to become a full professor of architecture, the 2nd to be elevated to fellowship in the AIA, and the 1st to serve as president of the National Architectural Accrediting Board, concluding by being inducted into the Michigan Women's Hall of Fame.

Sutton eventually accepted a professorship position at the University of Washington where she was a principal investigator of Ford Foundation study civic engagement by low – income youths, this work earned her an award as the second African American woman to receive the AIA Whitney M. Young, Jr. award.

During this period, Sutton served on the Seattle Design Commission and chaired the Capitol Hill Design Review Board, public service that earned her the American Institute of Architects (AIA) Seattle Chapter Community Service award and Medal of Honor award.

== Books ==
- Sutton, Sharon E., "Pedagogy of a Beloved Commons: Pursuing Democracy's Promise through Place-Based Activism," Fordham University Press, New York, 2023.
- Sutton, Sharon E., "When Ivory Towers Were Black: A Story about Race in America's Cities and Universities," Fordham University Press, New York, 2017. ISBN 978-0-823-27612-7
- Sutton, Sharon E., and Kemp, Susan P., editors, The Paradox of Urban Space: Inequality and Transformation in Marginalized Communities, Palgrave Macmillan, New York, 2011 ISBN 978-0-230-10391-7
- Sutton, Sharon E., Weaving a Tapestry of Resistance: The Places, Power, and Poetry of a Sustainable Society, Bergin and Garvey Publishers, Westport, 1996.
- Sutton, Sharon E., Learning through the Built Environment: An Ecological Approach to Child Development, Irvington Press, New York, 1985.

=== Book chapters and articles ===
- Sharon E. Sutton (2015). Foreword; and Chapter eleven: reality-based learning in design studio education. In Carla Jackson Bell (Ed.), Space Unveiled (pp. xvi–xvii and pp,102–112). New York: Routledge Research in Architecture Series.
- Sharon E. Sutton (2011). Struggling for the right to housing: a critical analysis of the evolution of West Seattle's High Point. In The Paradox of Urban Space (pp. 29–51).
- Sharon E. Sutton and Susan P. Kemp (2011). Introduction: place as marginality and possibility. In The Paradox of Urban Space, pp. 1–9.
- Sharon E. Sutton and Susan P. Kemp (2011). Place: a site of social and environmental inequity. In The Paradox of Urban Space (pp. 13–28).
- Sharon E. Sutton and Susan P. Kemp (2011). Place: a site of individual and collective transformation. In The Paradox of Urban Space (pp. 113–134).
- Sharon E. Sutton and Susan P. Kemp (2011). Conclusions: Standing shoulder-to- shoulder in a place-conscious society. In The Paradox of Urban Space (pp. 259–265).
- Sharon E. Sutton (2008). Engaging the public, seeking common ground; and Discovering the power of youth. In Nancy B. Solomon (ed.), Architecture: Celebrating the Past, Designing the Future (pp. 64–77;and pp. 84). New York: Visual Reference Inc.; Washington, DC: The American Institute of Architects.
- Sharon E. Sutton (2007). A social justice perspective on youth and community development: theorizing the processes and outcomes of participation. Children, Youth, and Environments, 17 (2), 616–645. [Available online at: http://www.colorado. edu/journals/cye].
- Sharon E. Sutton and Susan P. Kemp (2006, September). Integrated social science and design inquiry through interdisciplinary design charrettes: an approach to participatory community problem-solving. American Journal of Community Psychology, 38 (1–2), 125–139.
- Sharon E. Sutton and Susan P. Kemp (2005). Children's participation in constructing a social just public sphere. In Mark Blades and Christopher Spencer (eds.), Children and Their Environments: Learning, Using, and Designing Spaces (pp. 256–276). Cambridge, UK: Cambridge University Press.

== Awards and honors ==
- 2024 American Academy of Arts and Letters Architecture Department inductee
- 2023 AIA/ACSA Topaz Medallion for Excellence in Architectural Education Award
- 2023 Architectural Record Women in Architecture Design Leadership Award
- 2020 Beverly Willis Architecture Foundation Oculus
- 2017 American Institute of Architects, New York Chapter Medal of Honor Award
- 2014 American Institute of Architects, Seattle Chapter Medal of Honor Award
- 2011 American Institute of Architects (AIA) Whitney M. Young, Jr. Award
- 2006 American Architectural Foundation K-12 Architectural Education Award of Merit for CEEDS
- 2005 American Institute of Architects (AIA), Seattle Chapter Community Service Award
- 1999 Jeannette and David McKinley Fellowship Faculty Research Support
- 1997 Michigan Women's Hall of Fame Life Recognition Award
- 1996 Association of Collegiate Schools of Architecture Distinguished Professor Award
- 1995 American Institute of Architects Elevation to Fellowship
- 1992 University of Michigan Regents Award for Distinguished Public Service
- 1991 American Planning Association Education Award for Teaching the Public about Planning
- 1989 UM School of Business Administration First Round Award, National Zell Lurie Fellowship
- 19861989 W.K. Kellogg Foundation Group VII National Fellowship
- 1983 National Endowment for the Arts Design Research Recognition Award

== See also ==
- African-American architects
- Charles F. McAfee
