= Rožnov pod Radhoštěm =

- Town
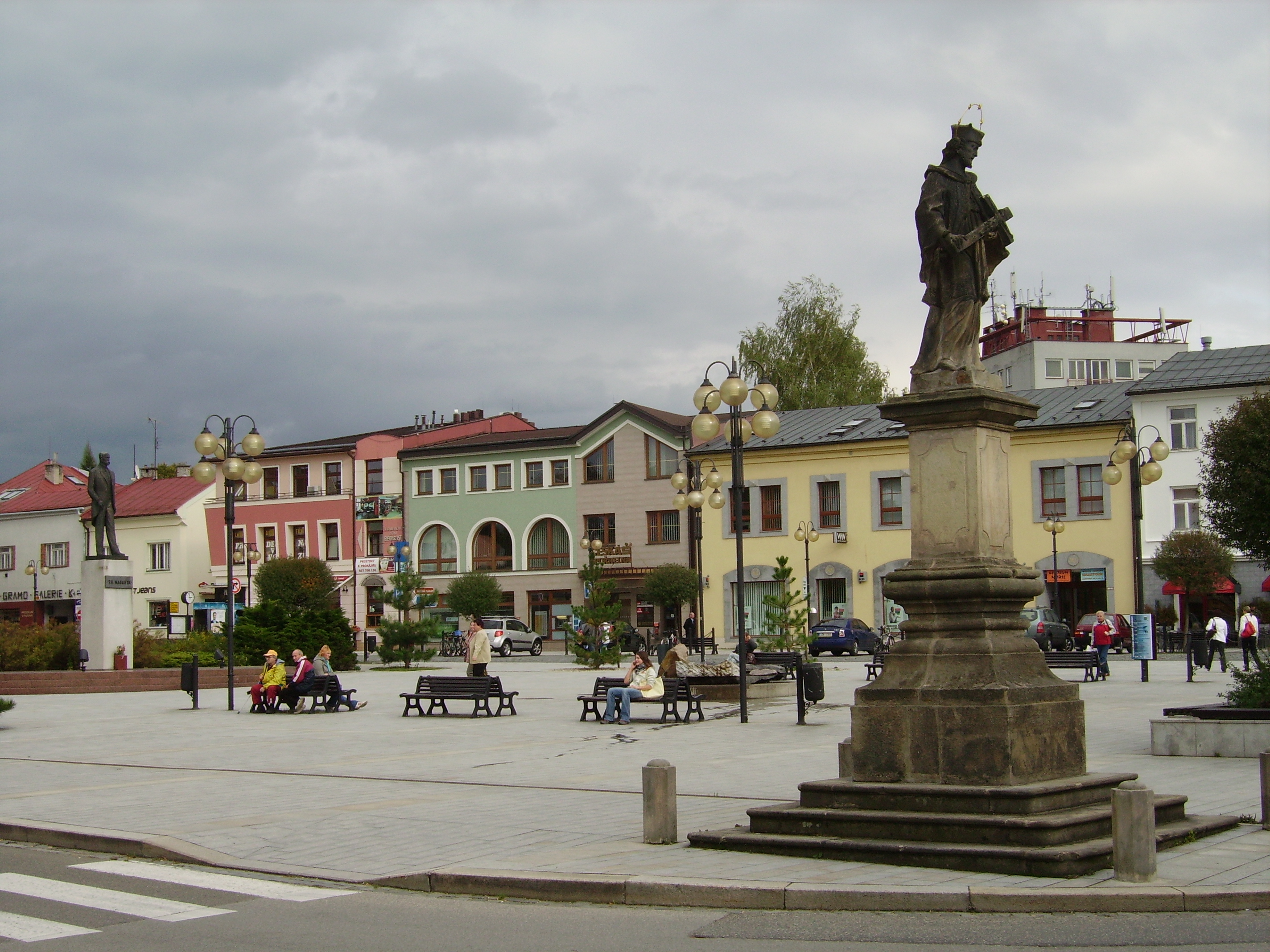
- The square Masarykovo náměstí

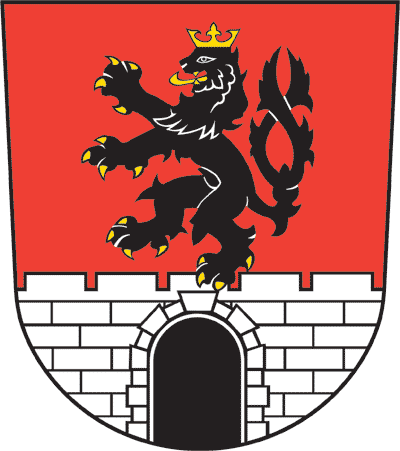
- Flag Coat of arms

- Location in the Czech Republic
- Coordinates: 49°27′31″N 18°8′35″E
- Country: Czech Republic
- Region: Zlín
- District: Vsetín
- First mentioned: 1267

Government
  - Mayor: Jan Kučera

Area
  - Total: 39.48 km^{2} (15.24 sq mi)
- Elevation: 378 m (1,240 ft)

Population (2026-01-01)
  - Total: 15,916
  - Density: 403.1/km^{2} (1,044/sq mi)
- Time zone: UTC+1 (CET)
  - Summer (DST): UTC+2 (CEST)
- Postal code: 756 61
- Website: www.roznov.cz

Rožnov pod Radhoštěm (Czech pronunciation: [ˈroʒnof ˈpod radɦoʃcɛm]; German: Rosenau unter dem Radhoscht) is a town in Vsetín District in the Zlín Region of the Czech Republic. It has about 16,000 inhabitants. The town is located in the valley of the Rožnovská Bečva River, in the Beskydy Protected Landscape Area.

Rožnov pod Radhoštěm is known for the Wallachian Open Air Museum, the largest open-air museum in the Czech Republic.

== Geography ==
Rožnov pod Radhoštěm is located about 17 kilometres (11 mi) northeast of Vsetín and 38 km (24 mi) south of Ostrava. It lies in the valley of the Rožnovská Bečva River. The northern part of the municipal territory lies in the Moravian-Silesian Beskids mountain range. The southern part with the built-up area lies in the Rožnov Furrow. The southernmost tip extends into the Hostýn-Vsetín Mountains. The whole territory of Rožnov pod Radhoštěm lies in the Beskydy Protected Landscape Area.

The highest point in the territory is located on the hillside of the Velká Polana mountain at 980 m (3,220 ft) above sea level. The Radhošť mountain whose name the town bears lies outside the territory.

Thanks to its location, protected by the surrounding hills from the north, the town has a favorable climate. The Carpathian winds that flow into the Rožnov Furrow dispel the fog and keep the weather in Rožnov pod Radhoštěm sunny for most of the year.

== History ==
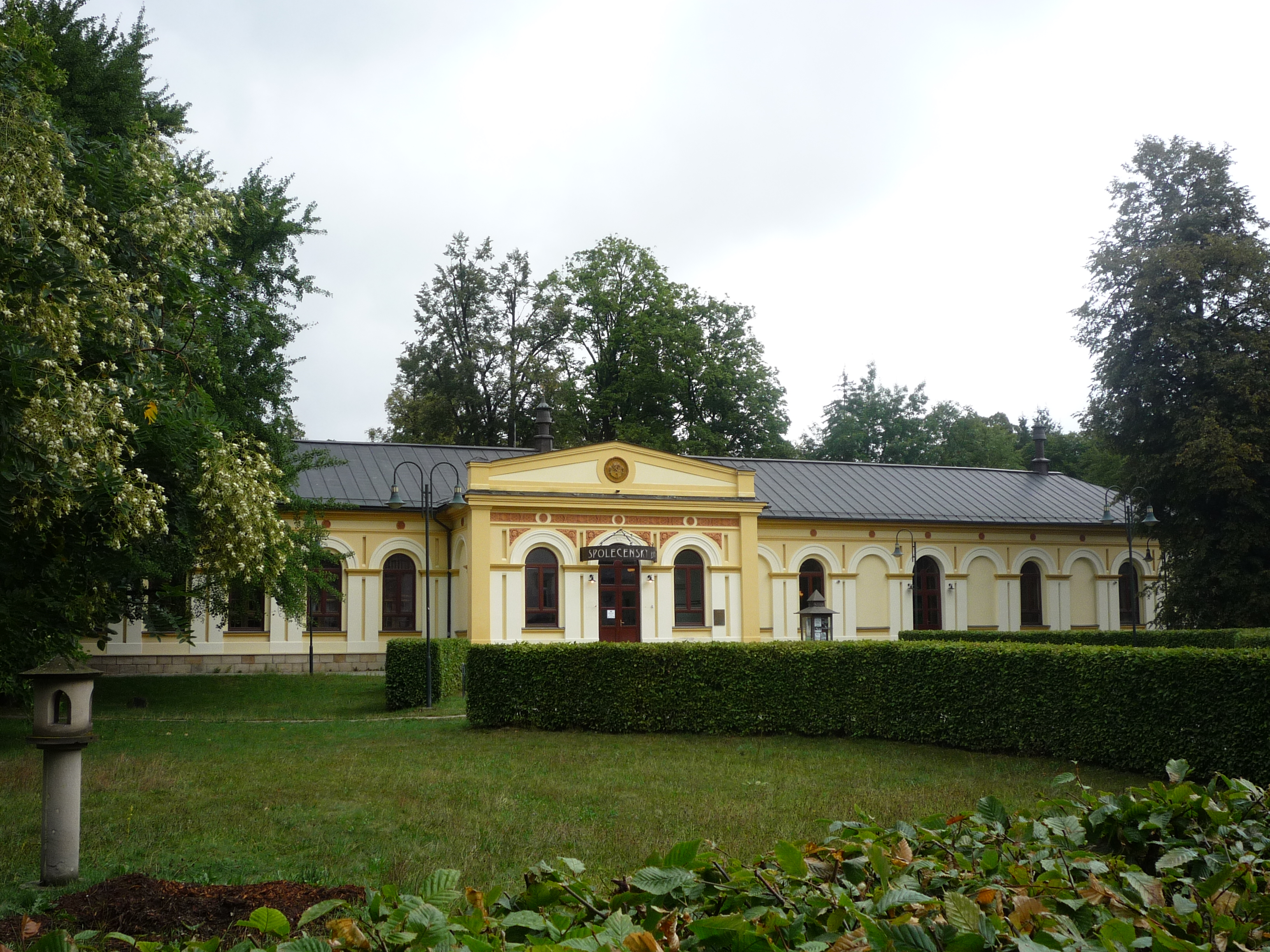
Social House, formerly a spa building

The first written mention of Rožnov is from 1267. The village was founded during the colonisation by Bruno von Schauenburg between 1246 and 1267, however, there is a possibility that there was already a small settlement that was only expanded. The castle on the Hradisko hill above Rožnov is first documented in 1310. In 1411, Rožnov was first referred to as a town.

After the town was owned by several noble families, including the Lords of Kravaře and the Lords of Cimburk, it was acquired by the Zierotin family in 1548, who owned it until the 19th century. During their rule Rožnov economically developed. The glass-making and weaving became important in the town. Rožnov was known throughout the whole Habsburg monarchy for weaving linen and muslin. Local embroidery also gained fame. However, the inhabitants otherwise subsisted mainly on agriculture and pastoralism.

For a long time, the town consisted only of wooden buildings and slowly transformed into stone ones. In 1796, a favorable healing effect of the local specific climate has been discovered. A climatic spa was founded in Rožnov in 1820. The spa history ended with the advent of World War II.

== Demographics ==
Historical population

Year	Pop.	±%
1869	4,415	—
1880	4,207	−4.7%
1890	4,076	−3.1%
1900	4,140	+1.6%
1910	4,240	+2.4%

Year	Pop.	±%
1921	4,178	−1.5%
1930	4,772	+14.2%
1950	4,928	+3.3%
1961	7,671	+55.7%
1970	10,885	+41.9%

Year	Pop.	±%
1980	15,468	+42.1%
1991	17,727	+14.6%
2001	17,845	+0.7%
2011	16,728	−6.3%
2021	16,005	−4.3%

Source: Censuses

== Transport ==
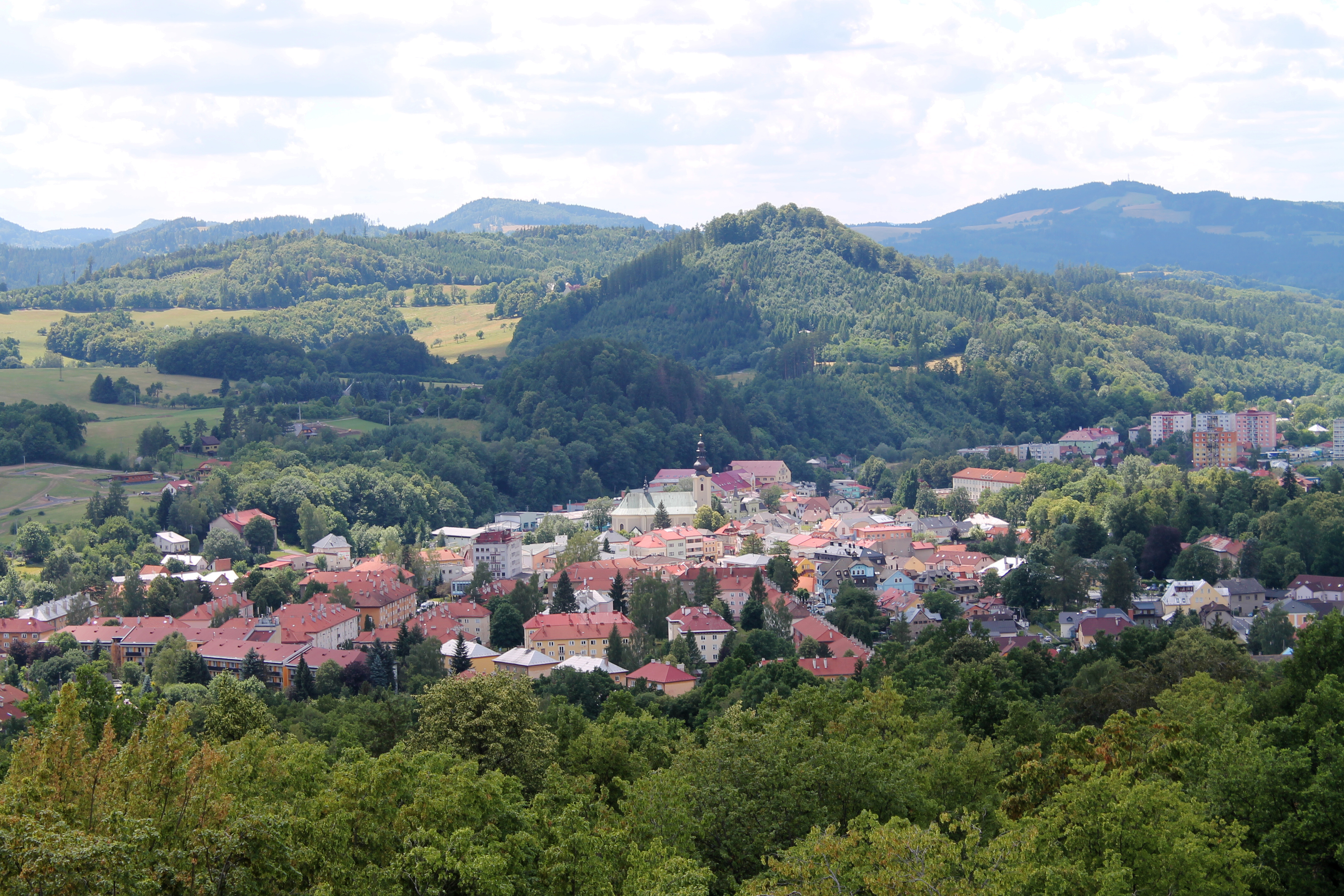
General view

The I/35 road (part of the European route E442) from Valašské Meziříčí to the Czech–Slovak border runs through the town.

Rožnov pod Radhoštěm is the starting point of a railway line to Kojetín via Valašské Meziříčí.

== Culture ==
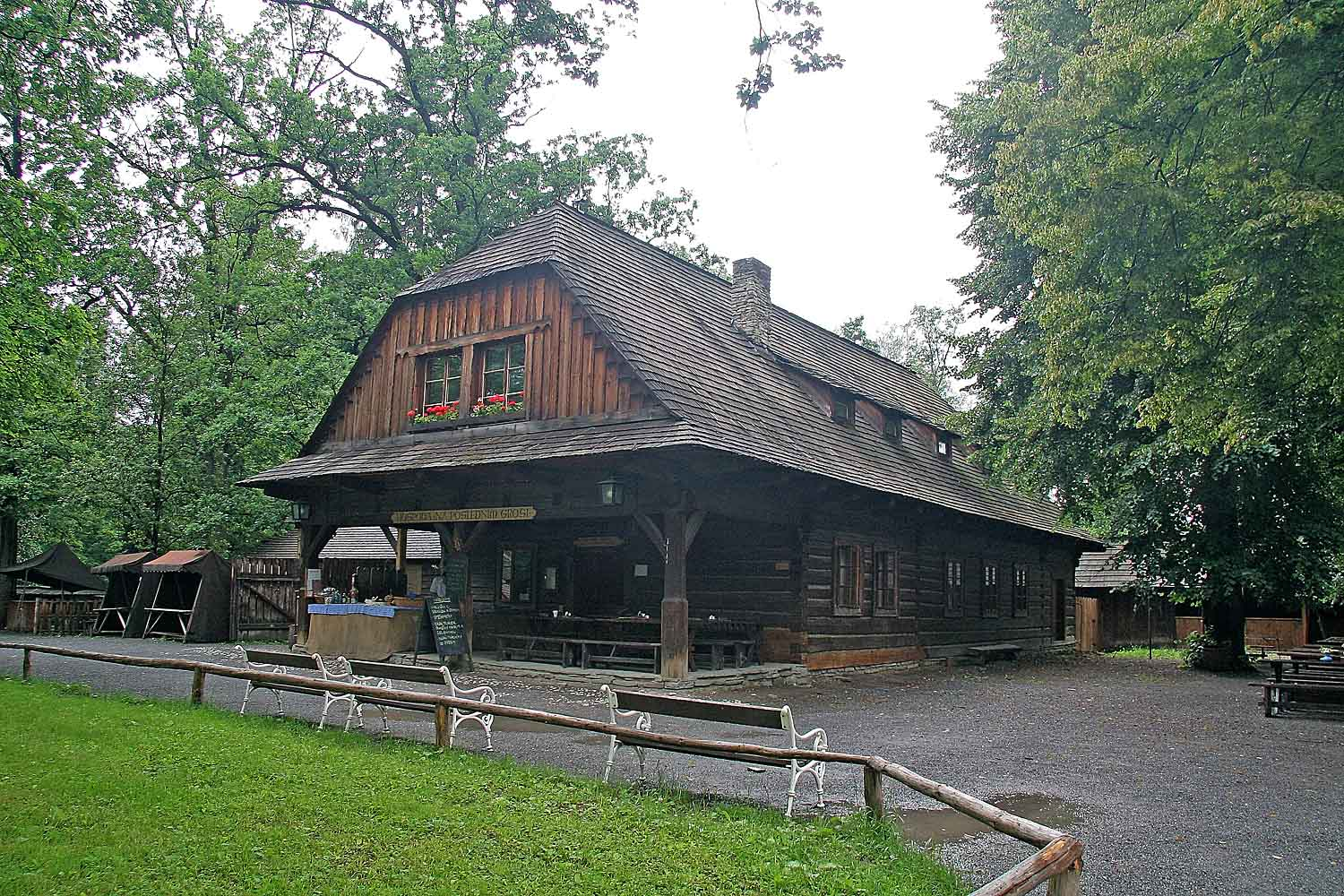
Wallachian Open Air Museum

Rožnov pod Radhoštěm lies in the cultural region of Moravian Wallachia. An international folklore festival called Rožnovské slavnosti ('Rožnov festivities') is held in the town every year.

== Sights ==
The Church of All Saints was built in 1745–1750. It replaced an old wooden church from the 16th century.

The Church of the Evangelical Church of Czech Brethren is a wooden building, built in 1950–1953. It is also protected as a cultural monument.

Rožnov pod Radhoštěm is known for the Wallachian Open Air Museum. It is the largest museum of its kind in the country. The life of the ancestors and folk architecture are presented in three separate areas called Little Wooden Town, Wallachian Village and Water Mill Valley. It is one of the most visited tourist destinations in the Czech Republic.

On the Hradisko hill is the ruin of the Rožnov Castle. After being abandoned and occupied by bandits, it was demolished in 1538.

== Notable people ==
- Naphtali Keller (1834–1865), Austrian scholar; lived and died here
- Leo Katz (1887–1982), American painter and muralist
- Gustav Brom (1921–1995), big band leader and arranger; lived here
- Emil Zátopek (1922–2000), athlete; buried here
- Alena Varmužová (1939–1997), mathematician
- Markéta Štusková (born 1974), tennis player
- Alena Vašková (born 1975), tennis player
- Martina Hingis (born 1980), tennis player; lived here as a child
- Petra Maňáková (born 1989), handball player

== Twin towns – sister cities ==
Rožnov pod Radhoštěm is twinned with:

- Bergen, Germany
- Körmend, Hungary
- Považská Bystrica, Slovakia
- Śrem, Poland
