= Christian Griepenkerl =

German painter and professor (1839–1916)

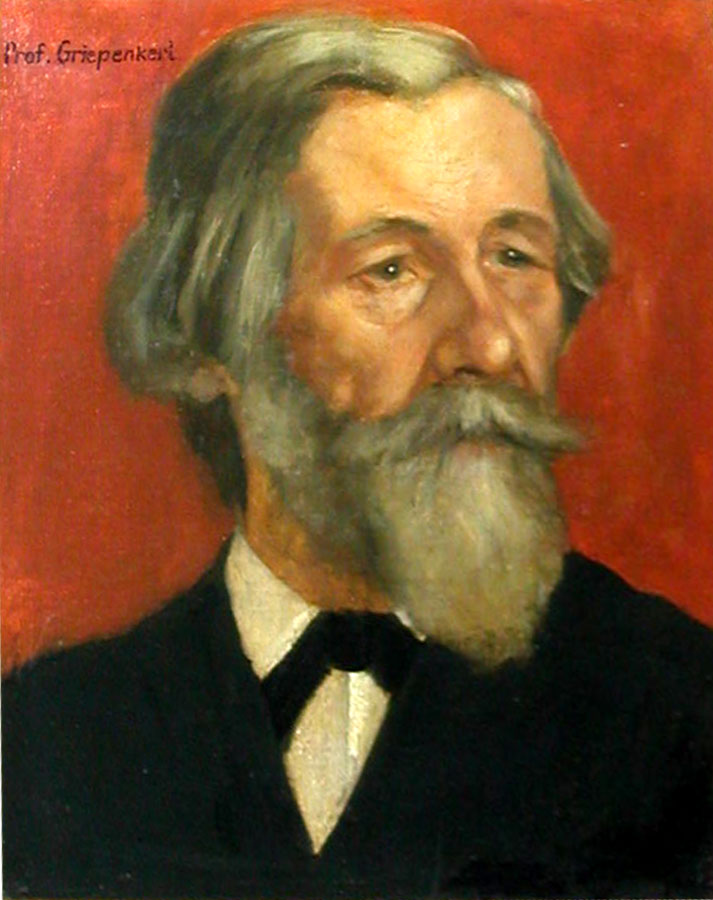
- Griepenkerl (ca. 1907)
- Born: 17 March 1839; Oldenburg, Grand Duchy of Oldenburg, German Confederation
- Died: 22 March 1916 (aged 77); Vienna, Austria-Hungary
- Resting place: Wiener Zentralfriedhof
- Known for: Rejecting Adolf Hitler's application to train at the Academy of Fine Arts Vienna
- Notable work: Eve at the Tree of Knowledge (1887)

Christian Griepenkerl (17 March 1839 – 22 March 1916) was a German painter and professor, best known for rejecting Adolf Hitler's application to train at the Academy of Fine Arts Vienna.

== Biography ==
Griepenkerl was born to one of Oldenburg's leading families. As a young man, he heeded the advice of his fellow countryman, the landscapist Ernst Willers, and went to Vienna in late 1855 in order to enroll at the private art school for the monumental paintings founded four years earlier by Carl Rahl. Rahl allowed several of his students to participate in drafting and carrying out his paintings and thereby shaped their individual artistic development. Griepenkerl's first painting – Œdipus, Led by Antigone – received Rahl's approval, and he was thereafter involved with Rahl and other students in painting frescos in the grand staircase of the Museum of Weapons (today's Heeresgeschichtliches Museum), in the Palais Todesco, and in the city palace of Simon Sinas. After Rahl's death in 1865, he individually continued and completed the master's unfinished commissions.

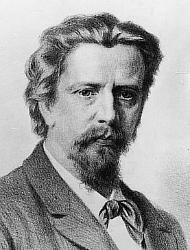
Christian Griepenkerl in 1882

In 1874, Griepenkerl was appointed a professor at the Academy of Fine Arts Vienna, where starting in 1877 he headed a special school for historical painting. His specialty was the allegorical representation using themes from classical mythology and portraiture. Griepenkerl thereby taught an entire generation of Viennese painters. Among his most famous students are Jurij Šubic, Carl Moll (1880–81), Alfred Roller, Jacques Bunimowitsch, Max Kurzweil, Paja Jovanović, Carl Otto Czeschka (1894–99), Richard Gerstl (1898–99), Egon Schiele (1906–08), Anton Faistauer (1906–09), Richard Geiger, and Uroš Predić. His conservative and "antiquated views" led to repeated protests on the part of his students and later even to withdrawals, leading among other things to the founding of the New Art Group.

Griepenkerl also became famous posthumously for having rejected Adolf Hitler's application to train at the Academy of Fine Arts Vienna. In 1907, when Hitler was provisionally admitted to prepare a sample drawing, Griepenkerl disapprovingly noted, "Sample drawing unsatisfactory. Too few heads." And in 1908, his verdict was simply "Not admitted."

== Works ==
Academy of Sciences in Athens

A larger collection are Rahl's compositions which Griepenkerl carried out with the help of Eduard Bitterlich in the new municipal opera house. They worked for four years on the ceiling of the auditorium and on the drop curtain of the tragical opera. It was only after the death of Rahl in 1865 that Griepenkerl took on his own monumental assignments. The architect Hansen employed him to decorate the Palace Ephrussi and Palace Epstein, Franz Klein hired Griepenkerl for the castle of Hornstein and for the palace of Sina in Venice. There he made the ceiling fresco Poseidon's Wedding Procession, Demons of the Storm, and Protective Ghosts of the Sea, which are of noble form and very graceful, but have some insufficiencies concerning the clothing and the illumination. Of the same importance are the wall paintings in the mansion of the grand duchess of Tuscany in Gmunden and his painting The Wedding of Aphrodite and Adonis in the dining hall of the Mansion Simon near Hietzing.

Griepenkerl also made the decorative oil paintings (finished in 1878) in the stairway hall of the Augusteum in Oldenburg, on the ceiling depicting the Venus Urania as the ideal of all beauty, surrounded by four themes from the myth of Prometheus; and on three walls (similar to the hémicycle of Paul Delaroche) is depicted an ideal gathering of the all-time heroes of art in historical sequence.

It was followed by a cycle of paintings – once again employing themes from the Prometheus myth – that are distinguished by a great concept of forms and a swinging composition, in the conference hall of the new Academy of Sciences in Athens.

== Honours and awards ==
- 1878: House and Merit Order of Peter Frederick Louis (Oldenburg)
- 1887: Order of the Iron Crown (Austria)
- 1912: Honorary grave at Vienna's Central Cemetery (Zentralfriedhof)
- 1924: the street Griepenkerlgasse in Hietzing district, Vienna was named after him

== Literature ==
- Thieme-Becker Vol. 15, 1922, page 22.
- "Griepenkerl, Christian". In: Österreichisches Biographisches Lexikon 1815–1950 (ÖBL). Vol. 2, Austrian Academy of Sciences, Vienna 1959, p. 59 f. (Direct links to "p. 59", "p. 60")

== See also ==
- List of German painters
