= Eduard Bitterlich =

Austrian artist

- Born: 17 August 1833; Stupnicka, or Dubliany, Galicia, now Ukraine
- Died: 20 May 1872 (aged 38); Pfalzau, now part of Pressbaum

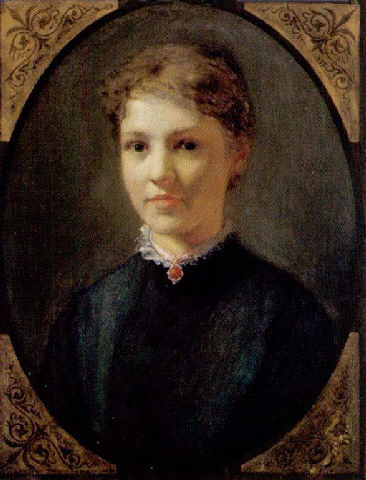
Portrait of a lady

Eduard Bitterlich (17 August 1833 – 20 May 1872) was an Austrian artist.

== Life ==
Bitterlich was born in Galicia where his father had established himself. While he was still young his parents moved to Vienna, with the intention of educating him for the civil service, but against their will he entered Waldmüller's studio, and devoted himself to miniature painting. In 1855 he went to Venice in order to copy the works of the old masters. Upon his return to Vienna he married Marie Singer von Wyssogurski, and immediately afterwards put himself under the direction of Rahl, whom he never afterwards left until his death. For this master he designed many fresco paintings, and sketched an immense number of small compositions, amongst them the 20 sheets for the Wanderings of the Argonauts, and the coloured sketches for the Duke of Oldenburg.

After Rahl's death, Bitterlich's principal work — executed in conjunction with Griepenkerl — was the design for the new Opera House. His earlier productions include the Pompeian figures in the Ypsilanti Palace, and the 20 lunettes in the banqueting hall of the Grand Hotel of Vienna, together with the pictures for the restored castle of Duke Leopold in Hörnstein. He died at Pressbaum, near Vienna, in 1872.
