= St. Stephen's Basilica =

Church in Budapest, Hungary

- Szent István-bazilika (Hungarian)
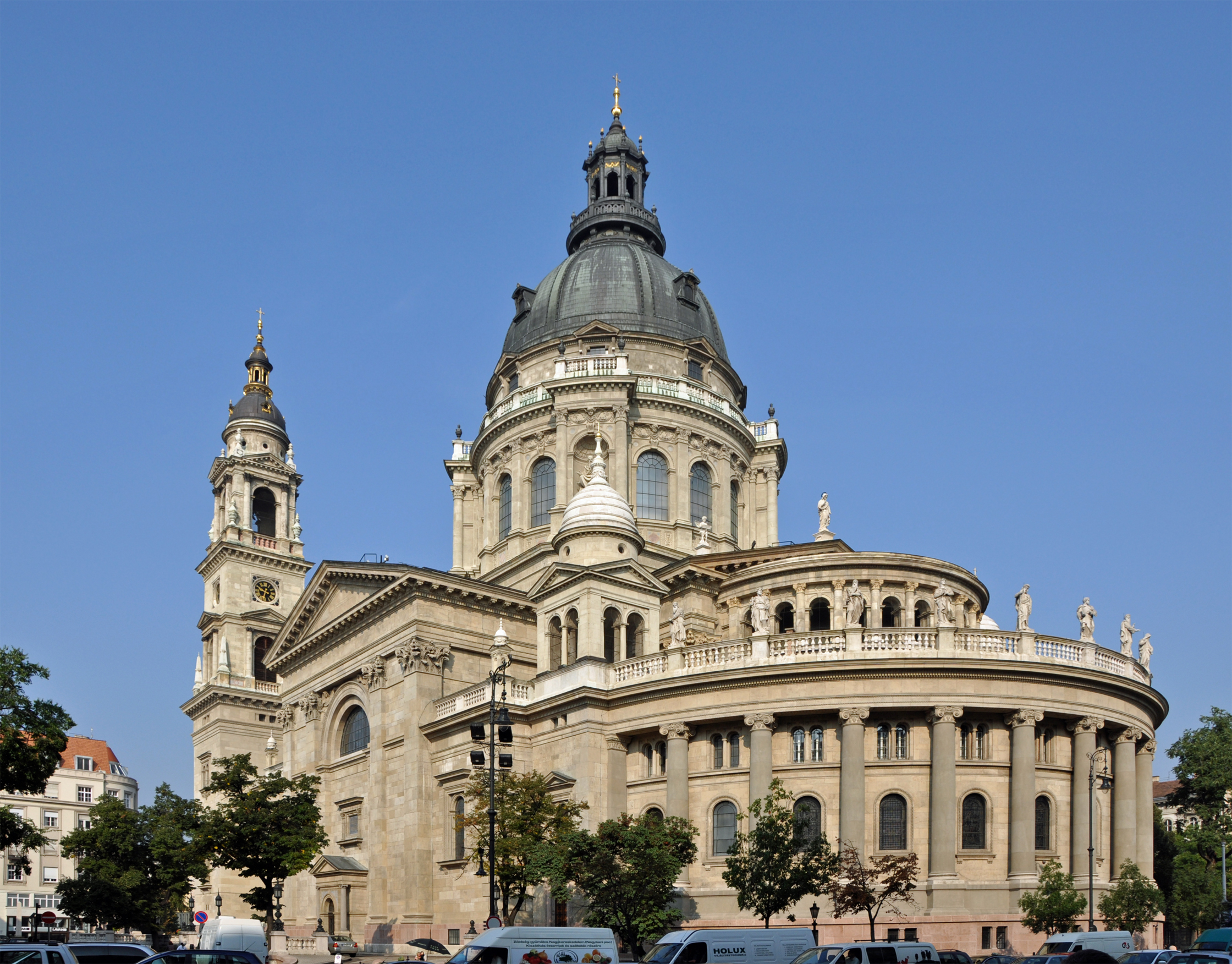
- The west façade

- Location within Budapest Location within Hungary
- 47.500833°N 19.053889°E
- Location: Budapest-Lipótváros
- Country: Hungary
- Denomination: Catholic Church
- Sui iuris church: Latin Church
- Website: https://bazilikabudapest.hu/en/

History
- Status: Basilica, co-cathedral

Architecture
- Functional status: Active
- Heritage designation: UNESCO World Heritage Site Buffer Zone
- Style: Neoclassical
- Years built: 1851–1906

Specifications
- Length: 87.4 m (287 ft)
- Width: 55 m (180 ft)
- Height: 96 m (315 ft)

Administration
- Archdiocese: Esztergom-Budapest

St. Stephen's Basilica (Hungarian: Szent István-bazilika [ˈsɛnt iʃtvaːn ˈbɒzilikɒ]) is a Roman Catholic basilica in Budapest, Hungary. It is named in honour of Stephen, the first King of Hungary (c. 975–1038), whose right hand is housed in the reliquary.

Since the renaming of the primatial see, it has been the co-cathedral of the Roman Catholic Archdiocese of Esztergom-Budapest. Today, it is the third largest church building in present-day Hungary. It is the largest church in Budapest and a significant historical landmark within the city's UNESCO World Heritage Site Buffer Zone.

== History ==
The site was the location of the Hetz-Theater, noted for hosting animal fights. János Zitterbarth of the newly formed district built a temporary church there. In the late 1810s, about a thousand people formed the Lipótváros Parish and began fundraising and making plans for the future church. During a devastating flood in 1838 the high ground here provided a measure of safe refuge to the residents, who, in thanksgiving, subsequently donated toward the construction of the church.

At first, the building was supposed to be named after Saint Leopold, the patron saint of Austria, but was later changed to honour Saint Stephen I of Hungary, the first King of Hungary (c. 975–1038), whose mummified right hand is housed in a reliquary. Its main patron was the Aromanian banker Simon Sinas. In 1931, Pope Pius XI awarded it the title of basilica minor; and served as the main venue for the 34th International Eucharistic Congress in May 1938.

Although the church suffered serious damage during World War II the cellar provided shelter for many refugees and a valuable collection of the Hungarian National Archives.

== Architecture ==
St. Stephen’s Basilica (Szent István Bazilika), Budapest, Hungary.

The church was designed in neo-classical style by József Hild. In 1858 the dome collapsed, which required complete demolition of the completed works and rebuilding from the ground up. Upon Hild's death in 1867, the project passed to Miklós Ybl, who modified Hild's initial plan to a more neo-Renaissance style. Construction commenced in 1851 and continued for fifty-four years. Work was completed in 1905 by József Kauser. The keystone was placed in the presence of the Emperor Franz Joseph I.

Equal with the Hungarian Parliament Building, it is one of the two tallest buildings in Budapest at 96 metres (315 ft) - this equation symbolised that worldly and spiritual thinking had the same importance. Regulations prohibited for a long period the construction of any building taller than 96 metres (315 ft) in Budapest. It has a width of 55 metres (180 ft), and length of 87.4 metres (287 ft).

The tympanum over the main entrance holds an 1893 mosaic designed by Mór Than, Our Lord on the Throne with Angels by Salviati of Venice. On the main facade, below the tympanum, is an inscription of Christ’s words: "Ego Sum Via, Veritas et Vita" (I am the way the truth and the life).

== Interior ==
The basilica has a Greek cross ground plan.

In the lobby of the main entrance you can see the Saint Stephen's relief of Károly Senyei, and mosaics by Bertalan Székely. The dome above the sanctuary shows the representation of the Lord God, and the tambourine shows Christ as well as the prophets and evangelists (built by Károly Lotz). The sanctuary vault features allegories of the Holy Mass on mosaics by Gyula Benczúr and highlights the important stages of St. Stephen's life in the bronze relief series by Ede Mayer. The canopy altarpiece designed by József Kauser is decorated with the statue of St. Stephen by Alajos Stróbl.

The pulpit is also work of József Kauser. The glass painting works were made by Miksa Róth, and the pipe organ of the church is the product of the factory of Pécs and József Angster recognized in the era. He carried out the painting and, in particular, the gilding of the interior decoration.

Other works of art inside the basilica (builders in parentheses):

Statues

- Ladislaus I of Hungary (János Fadrusz)
- St Elizabeth of Hungary (Károly Senyey)
- Gerard of Csanád (Alajos Strobl)
- Saint Mary (Pál Pátzay)
- St Margaret of Hungary (Béla Ohmann)
- St Emeric of Hungary (Sándor Boldogfai Farkas)
- Anthony of Padua (József Dankó)
- Saint Joseph (Pál Pátzay)
- Francis of Assisi (Alajos Strobl)
- Aloysius Gonzaga (Alajos Strobl)
- Jesus Christ (József Dankó)
- Thérèse of Lisieux (Béni Ferenczy)
- Rita of Cascia (Ernő Jálics)

Altar paintings

- St. Stephen offers the crown to Mary, altarpiece Gyula Benczúr
- Christ on the Calvary, altarpiece (Gyula Stetka)
- Saint Cecilia-altarpiece (Róbert Nádler)
- St. Imre-altarpiece (György Vastagh)
- Adalbert of Prague-altarpiece (Ignác Roskovics)
- József Szent-altarpiece (Árpád Feszty)

== Present day ==
Saint Stephen's is the most important church building in Hungary, one of the most significant tourist attractions and the third highest church in Hungary. The dome can be accessed either by elevator or 364 steps for a panoramic view.

A Christmas fair is held in the square in front of the basilica during the Advent season, and at that time of the year the façade is decorated with special light paintings in the evenings.

Part of the 2016 movie Inferno was filmed in St. Stephen Square in front of the basilica.

=== Concerts in the basilica ===
The Saint Stephen Basilica has played an active role in the musical community since its consecration in 1905. Organ concerts are performed in the basilica every Monday. The head organists of the church have always been very highly regarded musicians.

In the past century the Basilica has been home to choral music, classical music as well as contemporary musical performances. The Basilica choir performs often in different parts of Europe as well as at home. In the summer months they perform every Sunday. During these months you can see performances from many distinguished Hungarian and foreign organ players alike.

One of the most famous Hungarian organists is Miklós Teleki; along with András Virágh, he is among some of the best organ players in Hungary. The concerts include arias, which are sung by Kolos Kováts, one of the most famous concert and oratorio singers in Hungary; among numerous prizes, in 1992 he received also the highest prize Hungarian artists can acquire: the Kossuth Prize. The flute is played by Eleonóra Krusic, who is already known for her performances with different orchestras, from Barcelona to Zürich, Granz and Viena. These concerts take place on Thursday evenings and last a little over an hour. There are other performances available, such as the 15 minute "mini concerts" on Fridays, performed by András Virágh.

== Bells of the basilica ==
The façade is anchored by two large bell towers. In the southern tower is Hungary's biggest bell, weighing over 9 tonnes (8.9 long tons; 9.9 short tons). Its predecessor had a weight of almost 8 tonnes (7.9 long tons; 8.8 short tons), but it was used for military purposes during World War II.

The two towers have six bells altogether: five small bells in the north tower and a single bourdon in the south tower. The bourdon called the Great St. Stephan bell is the biggest bell in Hungary with its 9250 kilograms and its diameter of 252 centimeters. Usually it is used twice a year, at 5pm on August 20, which is the date it was consecrated while the four smaller bells were consecrated three years later on the same day. It also tolls at midnight on New Year's Eve and some special events when it tolls like the death of a Prime Minister or tragic events like the 9/11, but it is quite rare. The four smallest bells are founded in Passau in 1993.

- Great St. Stephan bell:

The largest bell in the church and in Hungary. Located in the south tower, it weighs 9250 kg and has a diameter of 240 cm. It was made by the Perner bell foundry in Passau, Germany in 1990, this bell chimes the hour.

- Blessed Virgin Mary bell:

The 2nd largest and oldest bell in the church, founded by Ferenc Walser in 1863 in Pest. It weighs 3100 kg and has a diameter of 178,5 cm, this bell chimes the quarter hours and has a unique looking clapper.

- St. Henry II. bell:

It weighs 2150 kg and has a diameter of 150 cm.

- Blessed Gizella bell:

It weighs 1250 kg and has a diameter of 117,8 cm.

- Saint Emeric bell:

The 2nd smallest bell in the church, weighing 750 kg.

- Saint Erzsébet (Elizabeth) from the House of Árpád bell:

The smallest bell in the church, weighing 500 kg.

== Gallery ==
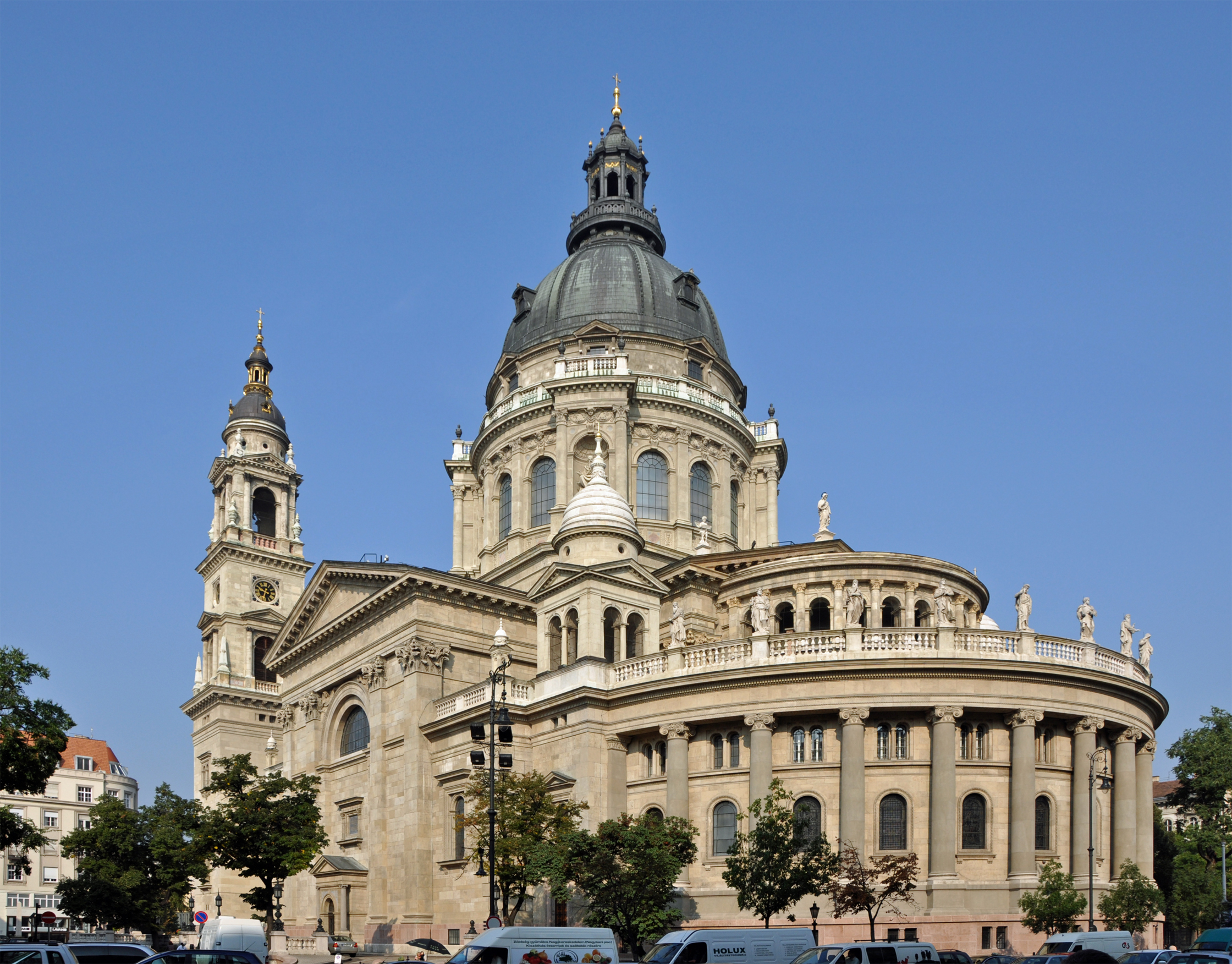
View from the southeast

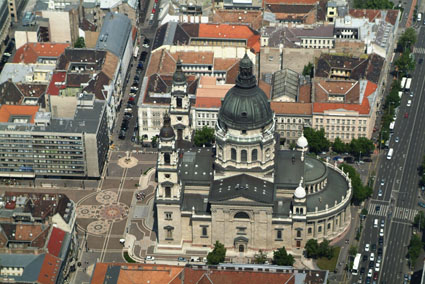
Aerial photograph of the Basilica

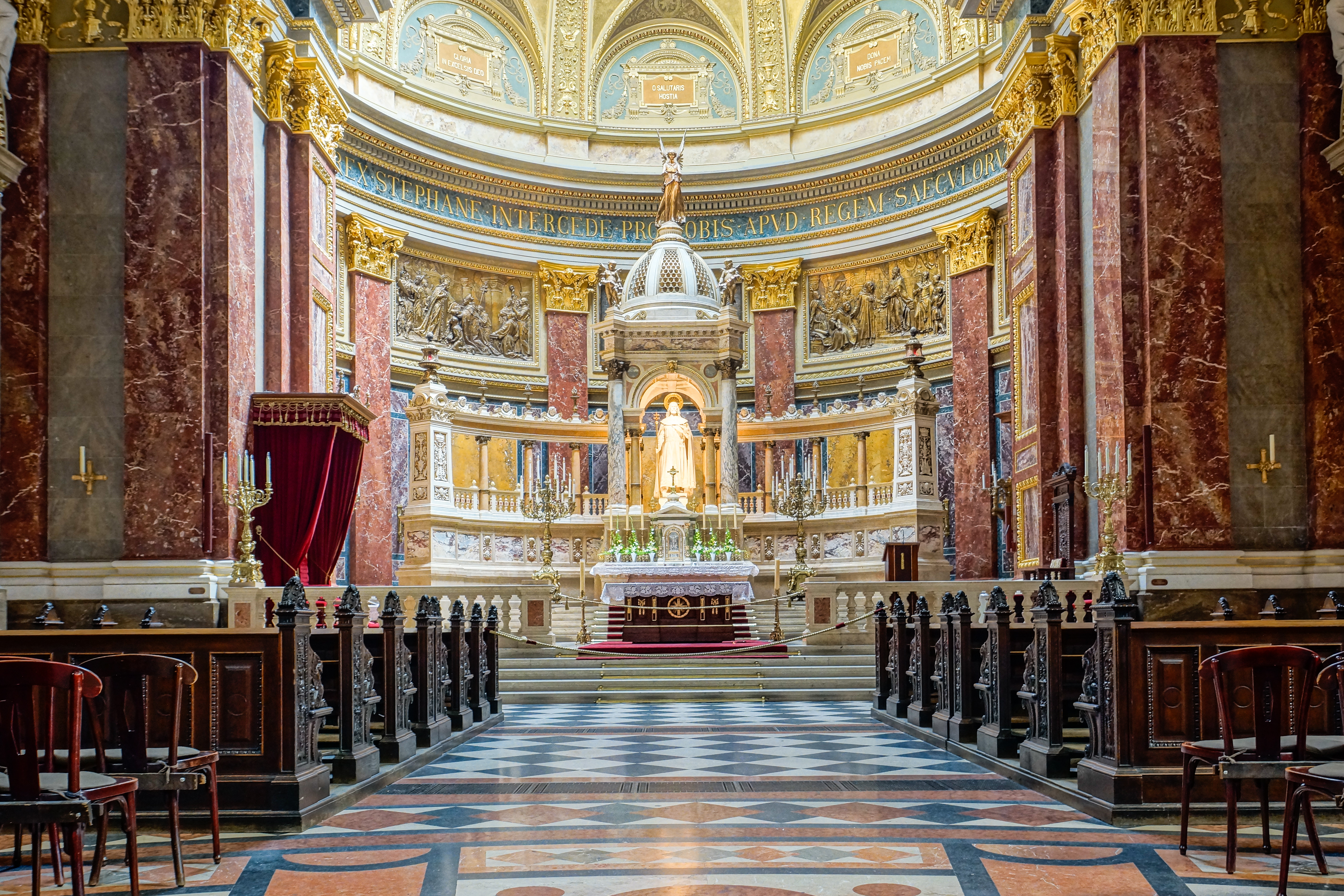
Sanctuary and altar

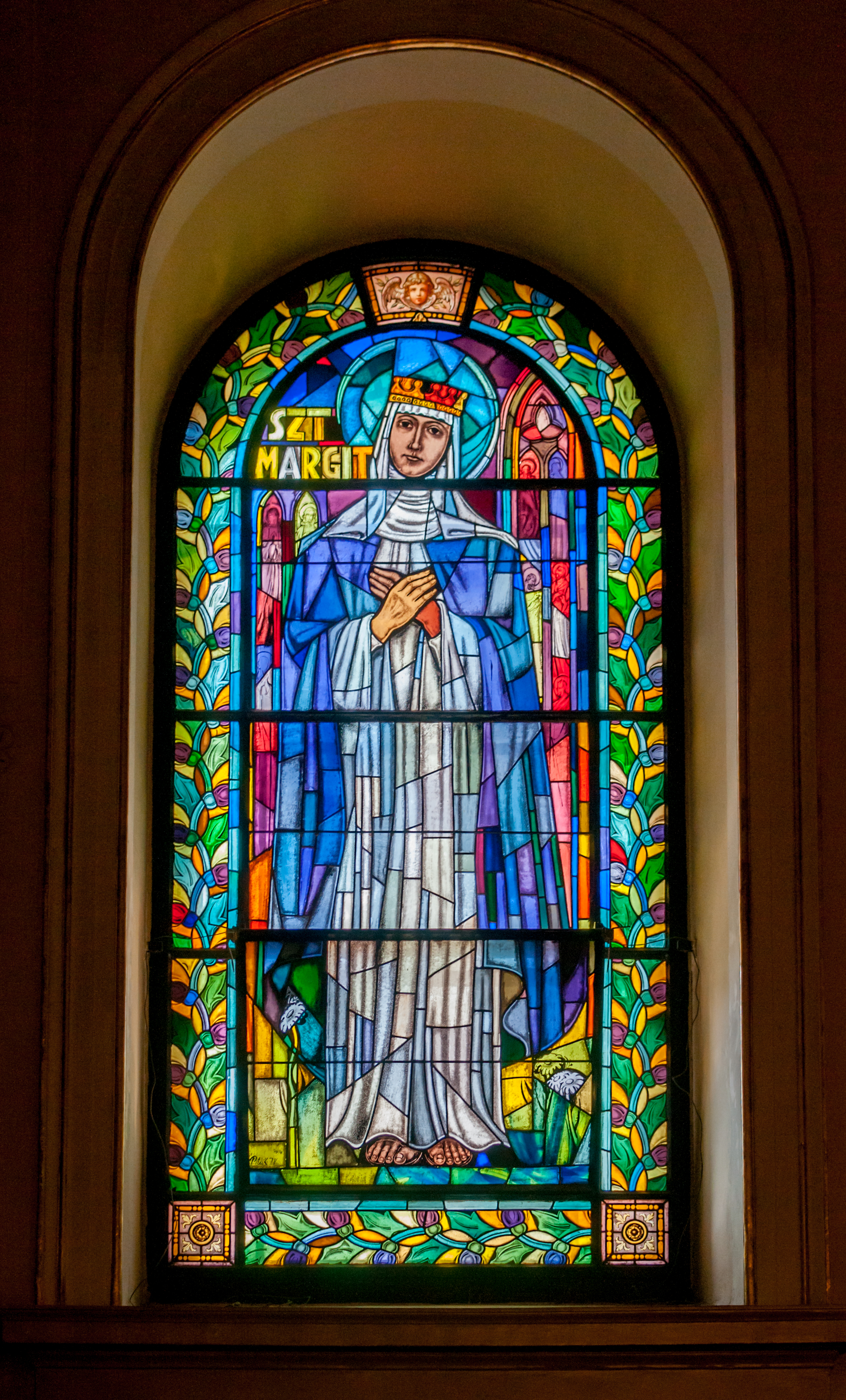
Window depicting St. Margaret

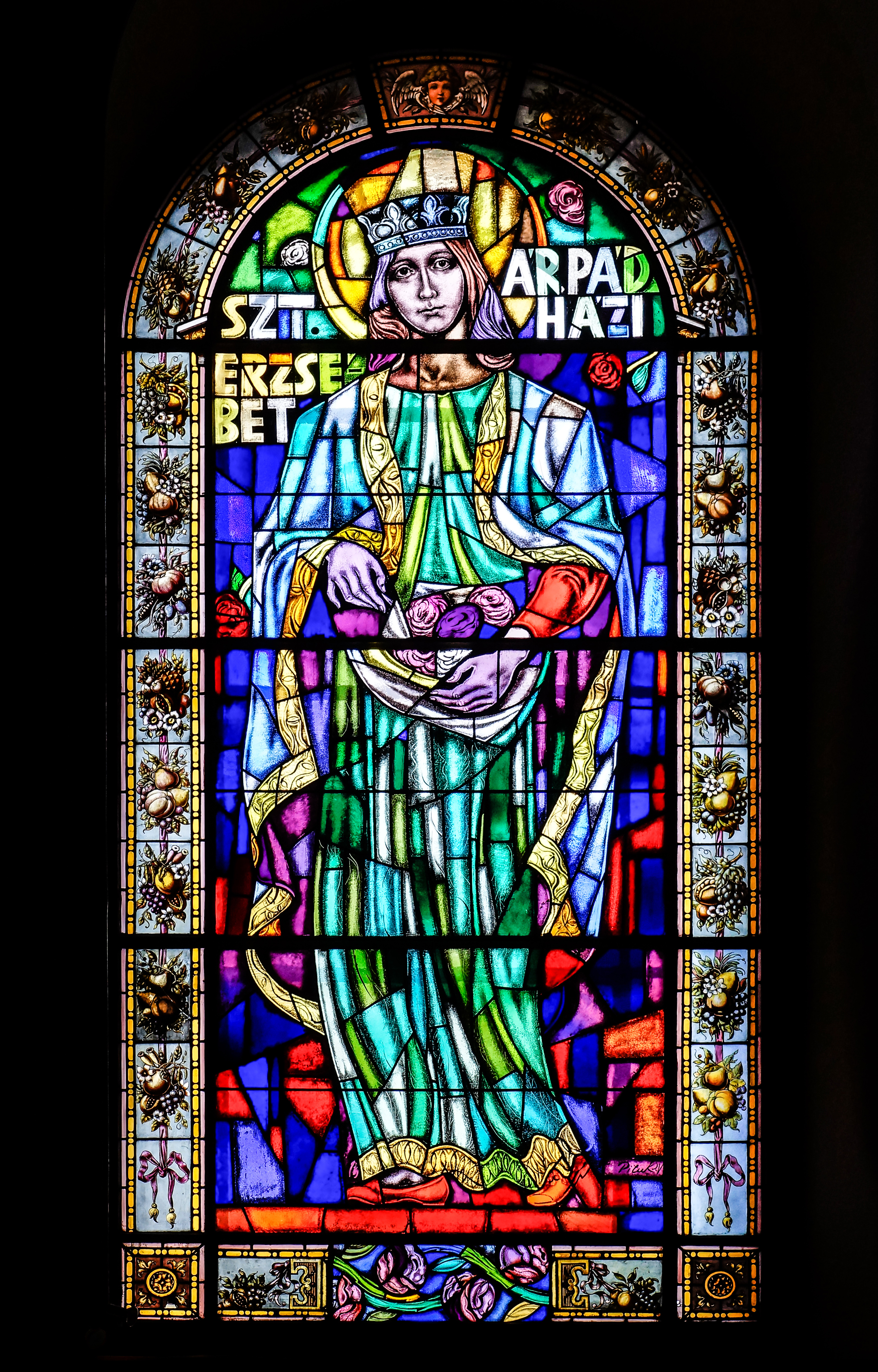
Window depicting St. Elizabeth

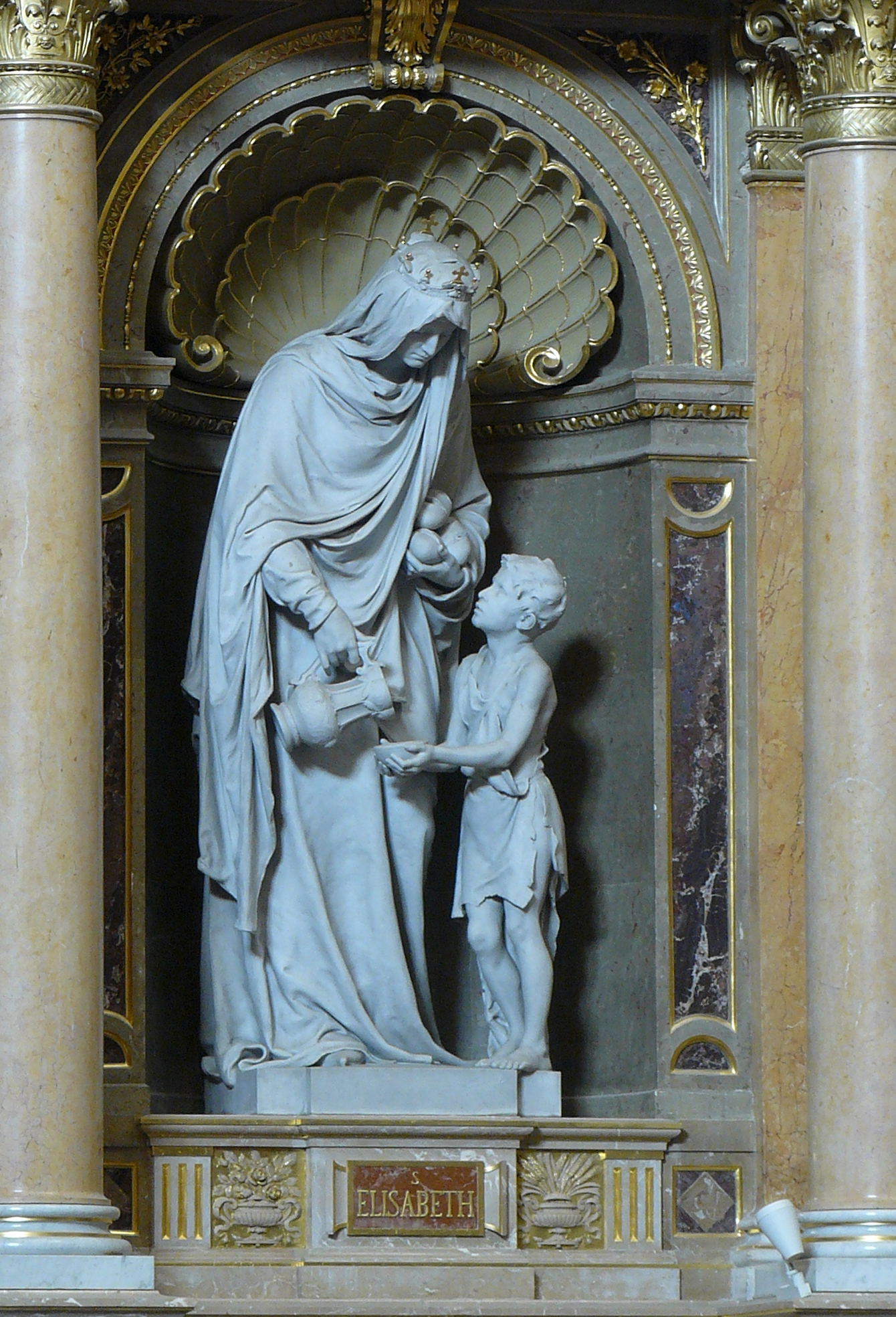
Statue of St. Elizabeth

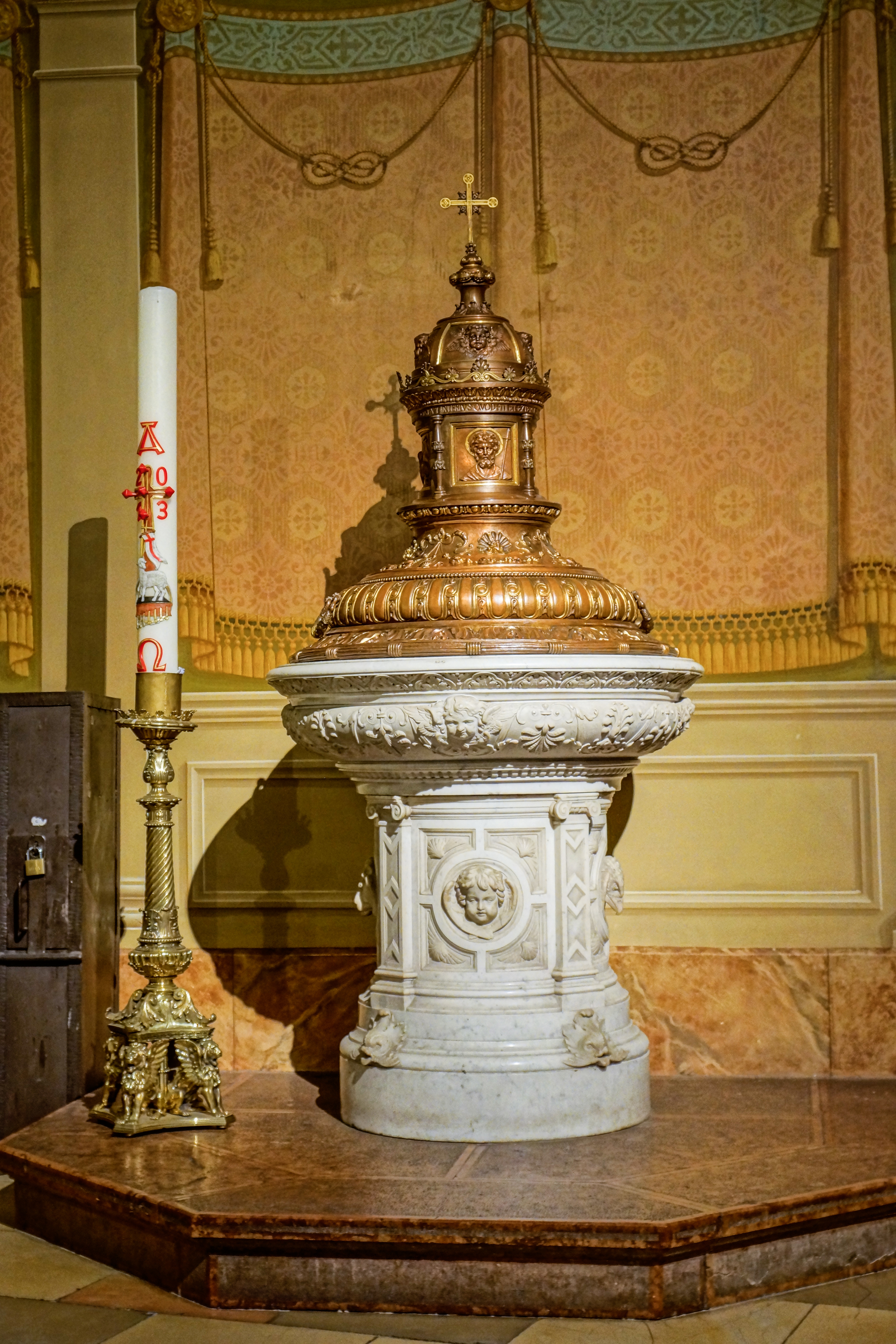
Baptismal font

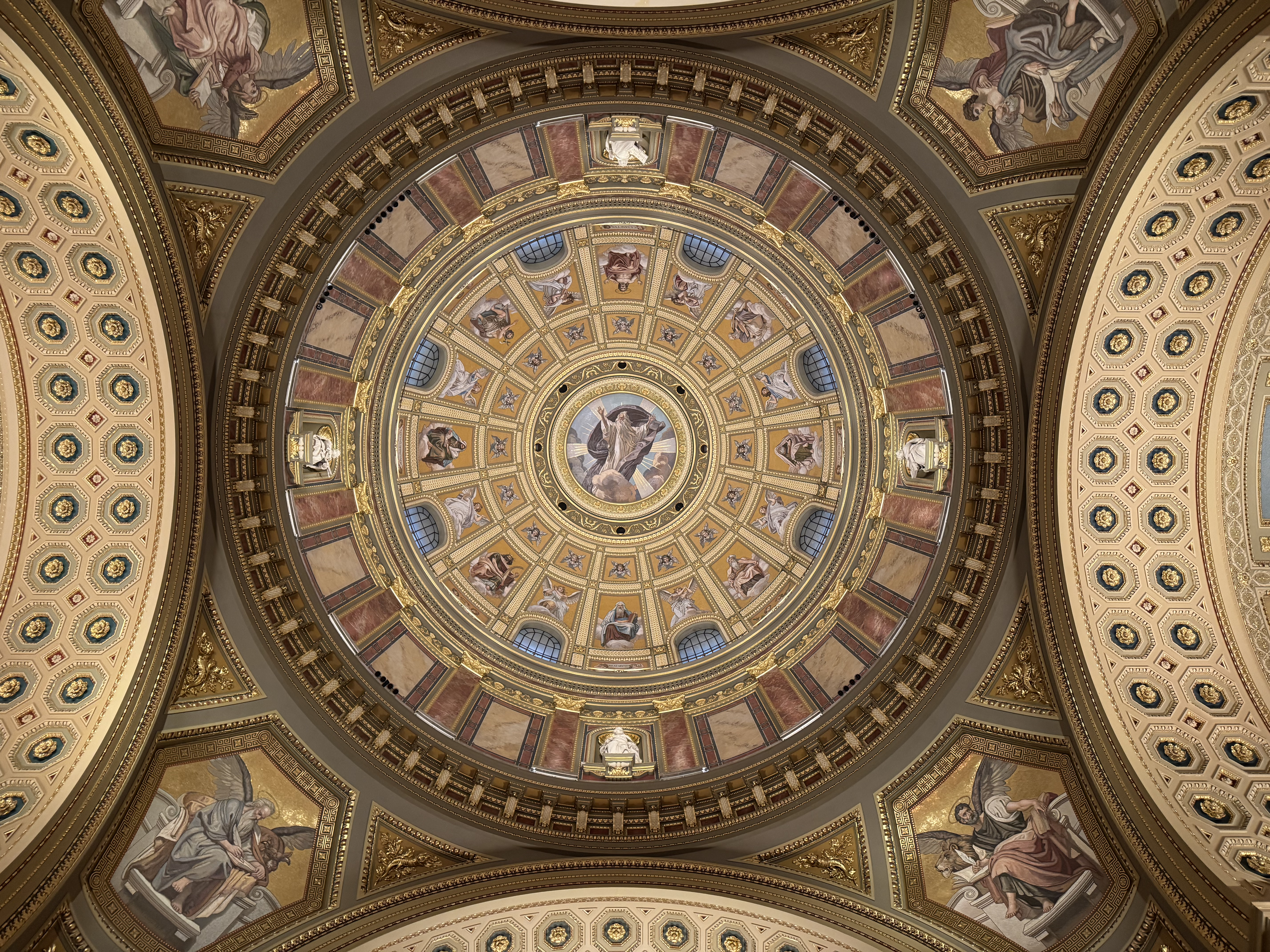
Interior of the cupola

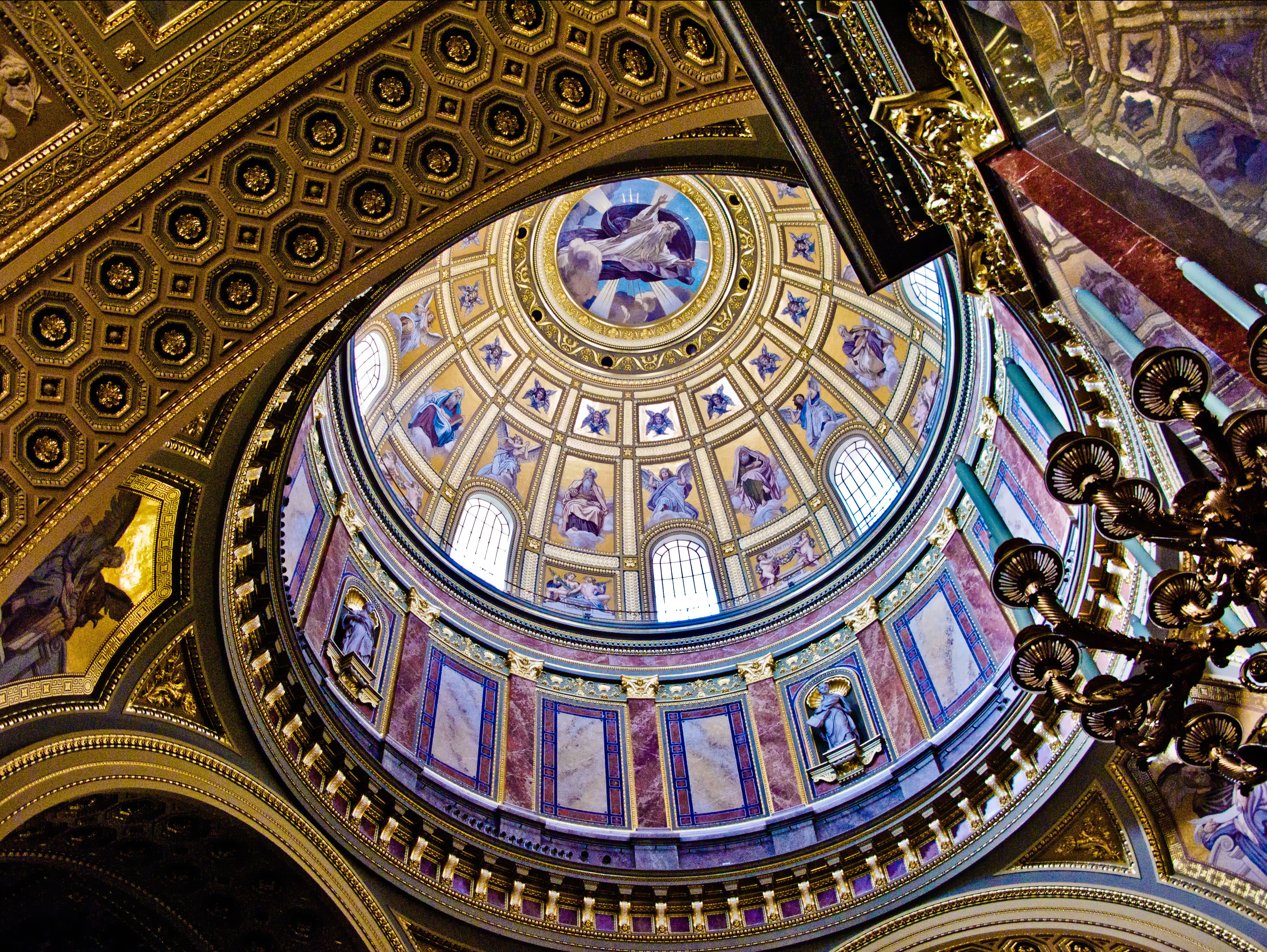
Cupola

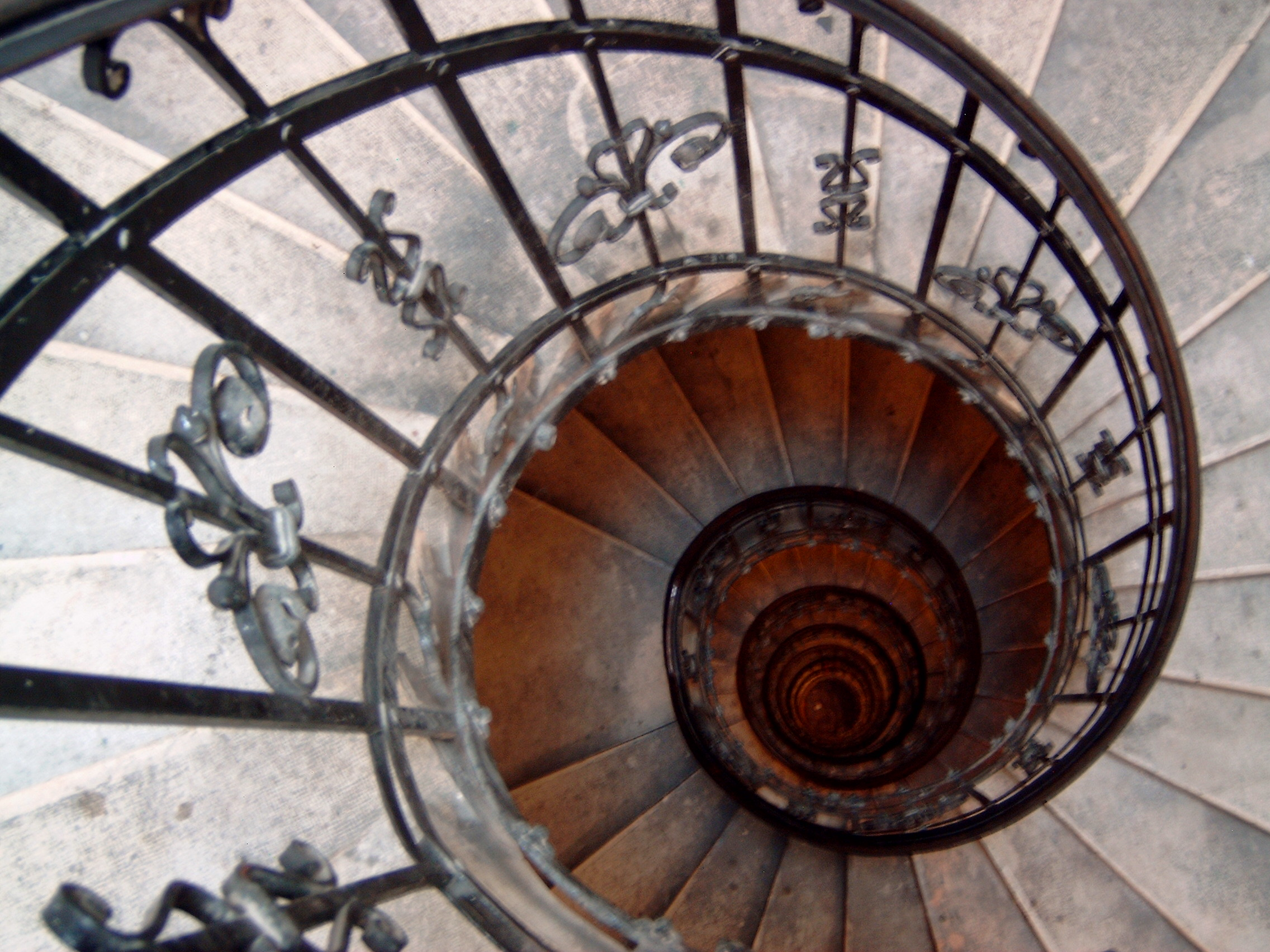
Looking down the staircase from the dome

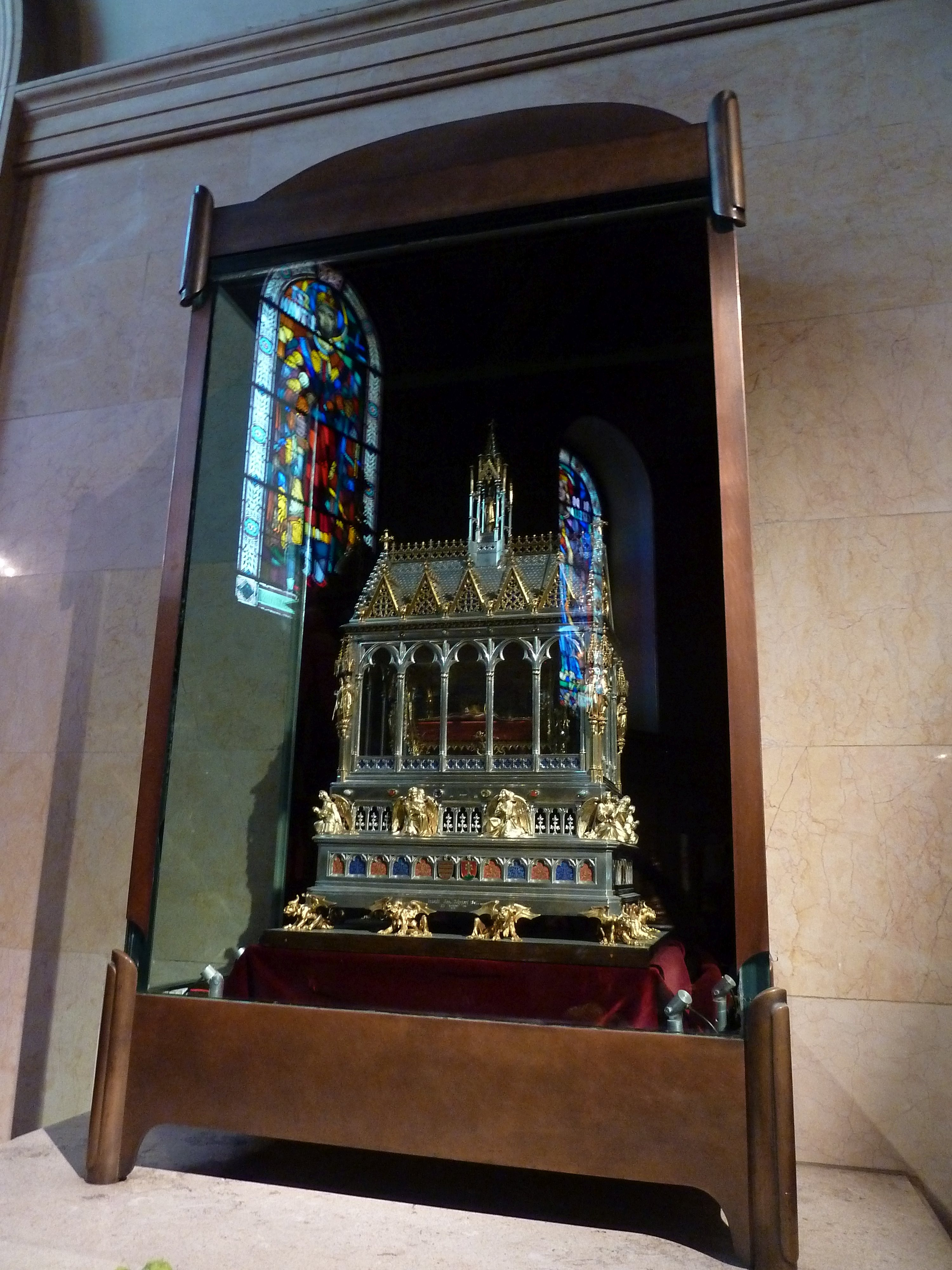
Shrine with St. Stephan's relics

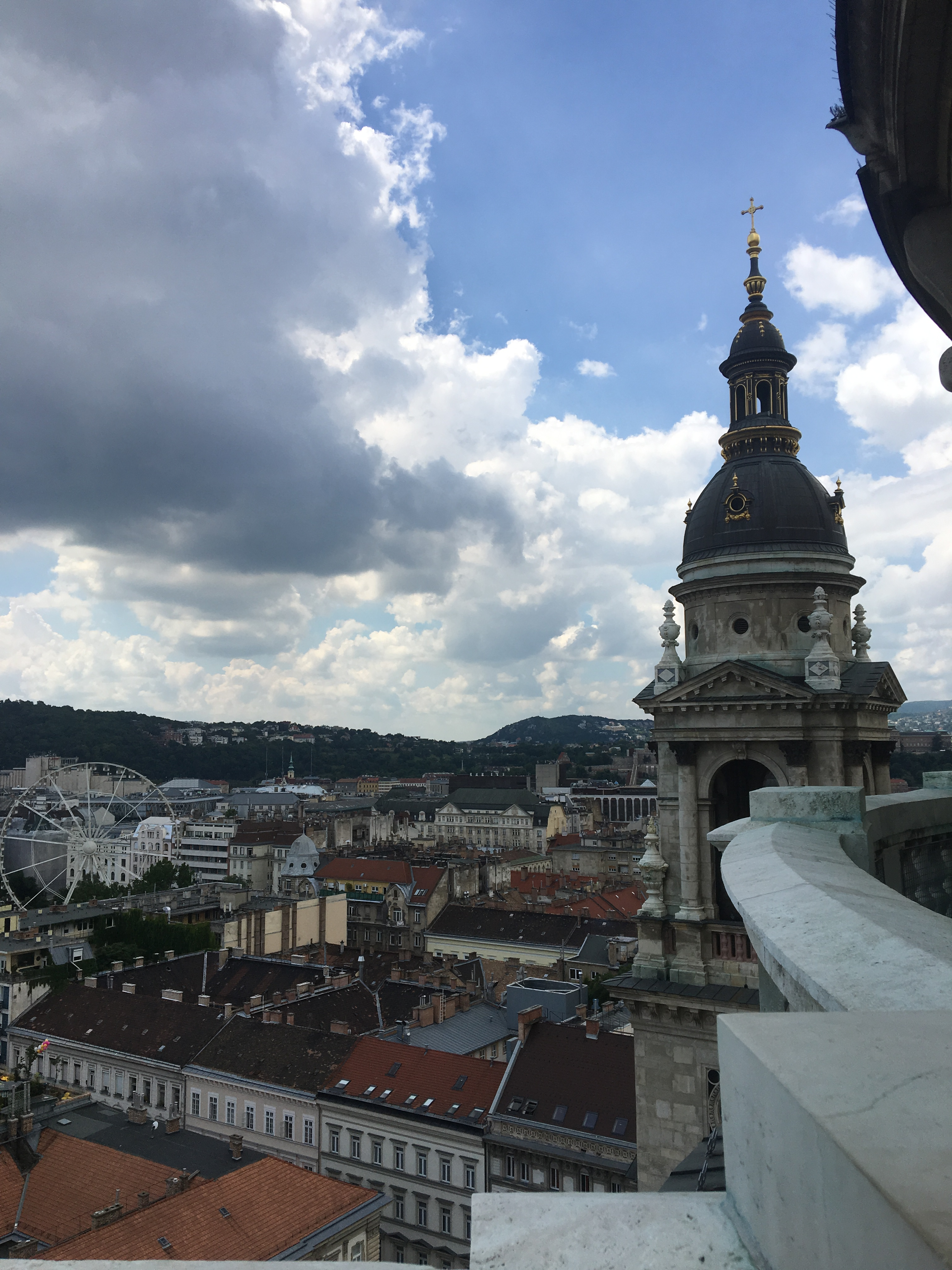
View from St. Stephen's Basilica

== See also ==
- Pest
- Roman Catholicism in Hungary
- List of cathedrals in Hungary
- List of tallest domes
