= Carl Rahl =

Austrian painter (1812–1865)

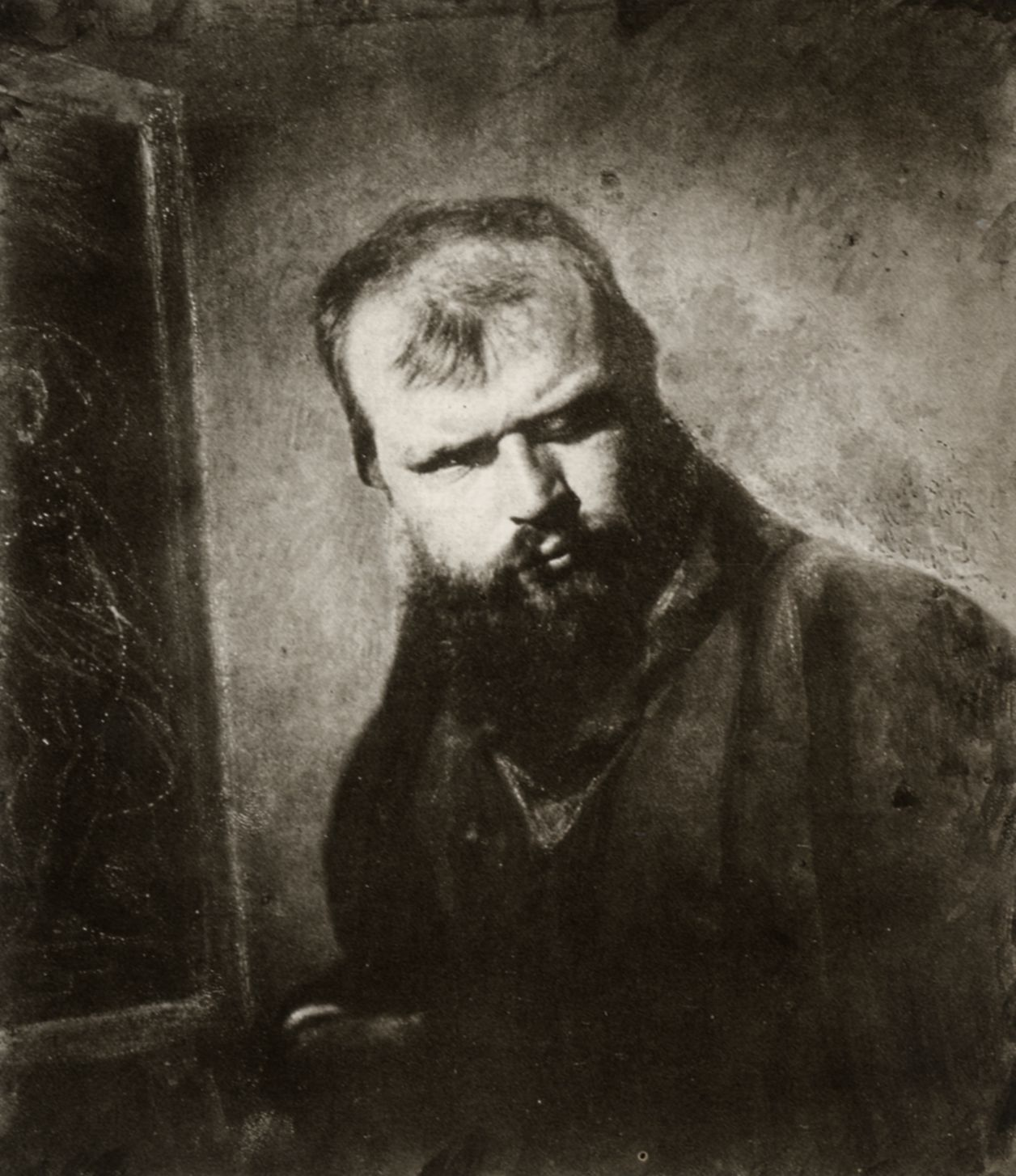
Carl Rahl c. 1850

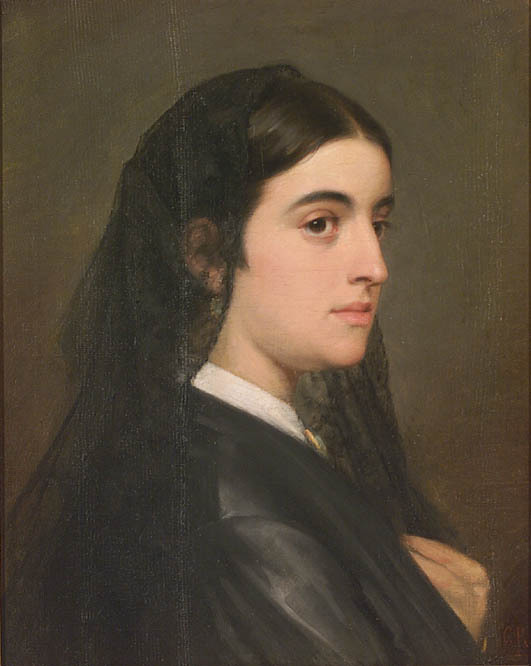
Portrait of a Young Widow, 1849

Carl Rahl, sometimes spelled Karl Rahl (13 August 1812 – 9 July 1865), was an Austrian painter.

== Life ==
Rahl was born in Vienna to Carl Heinrich Rahl (1779–1843), an engraver. He attended the Academy of Fine Arts Vienna and won a prize at the age of 19. From there he traveled to Munich, Stuttgart, Hungary, and in 1836 to Italy. He remained in Italy from 1836 to 1843, where he in particular studied representatives of the Venetian and Roman schools of art, and painted die Auffindung von Manfreds Leiche (1836).

Rahl's style, especially his views on color and perspective, were largely formed during his years in Rome. He returned after 1843 to Vienna for two years, and then led an itinerant life for the next five years, traveling through Holstein, Paris, Rome, Copenhagen, and Munich, making a living as a portrait painter. In this period he painted Manfreds Einzug in Luceria (1846), and die Christenverfolgung in den Katakomben.

In 1850, he was appointed professor at the Academy of Fine Arts Vienna, but for political reasons he was soon dismissed from the position. He then opened a private art school, which expanded quickly into a studio that produced monumental-scale paintings and enjoyed considerable success. Among his notable pupils were Eduard Bitterlich, August Eisenmenger, Joseph Matthäus Aigner, Károly Lotz, Christian Griepenkerl, Gustav Gaul, Mihály Munkácsy and Mór Than.

== Work ==
Rahl was commissioned by Greek philanthropist Simon Sinas to paint a number of works for the facade and vestibule of Vienna's Fleischmarkt Greek Church (Ludwig Thiersch being commissioned for the remainder of the frescoes), which was then being rebuilt by the Danish-Austrian neo-classical architect Theophil Hansen. In addition, Sinas commissioned four paintings depicting heroes of the Greek War of Independence, and a further four paintings to decorate his residence.

Rahl decorated the Heinrichshof in 1861 with personifications of Art, Friendship, and Culture, and the Palais Todesco with representations from the mythology of Paris. In 1864, he painted a number of allegorical figures in the stairway of the Waffenmuseum (now part of the Kunsthistorisches Museum). In this period he also painted several frescoes: Mädchen aus der Fremde (in a villa of Gmunden), a composition for a ballroom of Schloss Oldenburg, and a cycle from the tale of the Argonauts.

Also, he painted the tympanum of the Athens Academy building, designed by Theophil Hansen in 1859 and executed by Ernst Ziller (completed in 1885), and paintings in the portico of the central building of the National and Kapodistrian University of Athens, designed by Christian Hansen (Theophil Hansen's brother). The central painting shows the university's founder, King Otto I of Greece, surrounded by the Muses; the left hand fresco shows Prometheus bringing fire down from Mount Olympus.

In his later years he painted scenic backdrops for the New Opera (Neue Oper), which were continued after his death by his pupils. He designed the first curtain of the Hofoper in Vienna, used for performances of tragic operas. The design was after his death completed by his student Christian Griepenkerl, and painted by Eduard Bitterlich.

== Bibliography ==
- "Rahl". Meyers Konversations-Lexikon (in German). Vol. 13 (4th ed.). 1890. p. 556.
