= Károly Lotz =

German-Hungarian painter

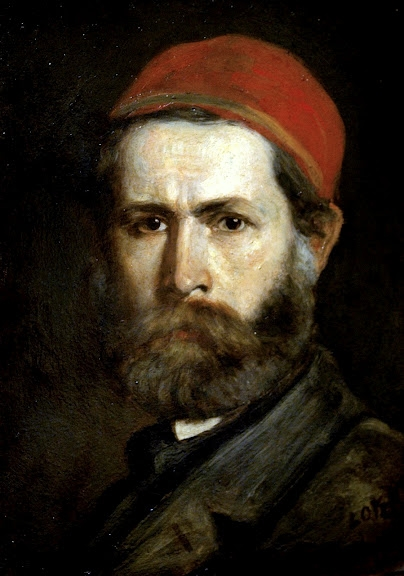
- Selfportrait of Károly Lotz
- Born: Károly Lotz; 16 December 1833; Bad Homburg vor der Höhe, Electorate of Hesse
- Died: 13 October 1904; Budapest, Austria-Hungary
- Education: TU Wien, Vienna
- Occupation: Architect
- Spouse: Anna Ónody
- Children: Ilona; Viktor; Kornélia
- Practice: Mór Than

Lotz Károly Antal Pál, or Karl Anton Paul Lotz (16 December 1833 – 13 October 1904) was a German-Hungarian painter.

== Career ==
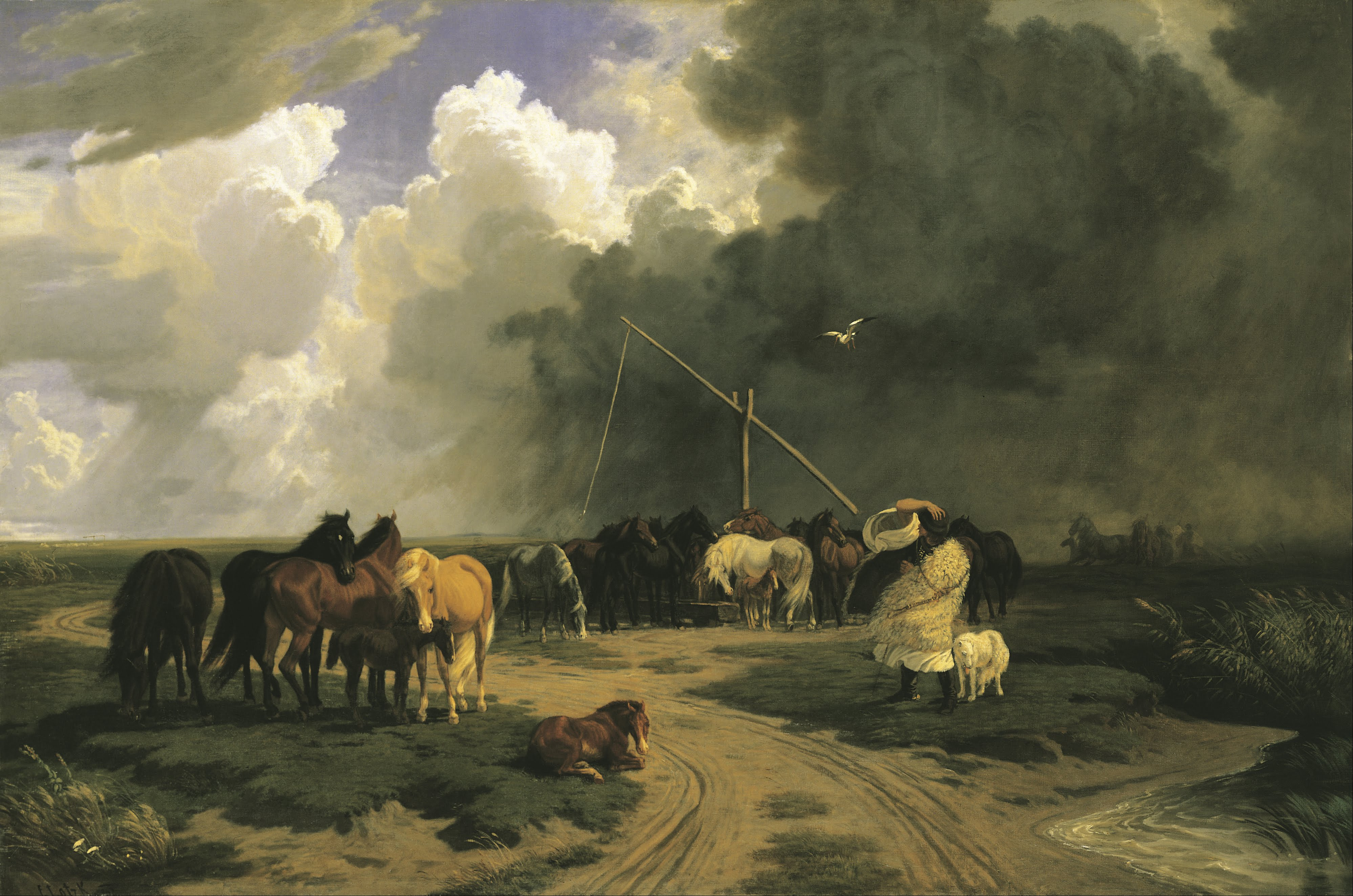
Horses in a Rainstorm (1862)

Karl Lotz was born in Bad Homburg vor der Höhe, Germany, the 7th and youngest surviving child of Wilhelm Christian Lotz and Antonia Höfflick (Höfflich). His father was a valet of Prince Gustav zu Hessen-Homburg at the time when the prince was representing Austria at the Congress of Vienna, which among other matters dealt with the House of Hessen-Homburg's rights of sovereignty over Hessen-Darmstadt. The sudden death of the young Baron von Sinclair, chargé d'affaires, forced W. C. Lotz temporarily into the rôle. While in Hungary in 1815 he made the acquaintance of the 13-year-old Antonie Hoefflich, whom he married three years later. She gave birth to 8 children, of whom Karl was the youngest.

W. C. Lotz died in 1837 and Antonie moved the family to Pest (now one of the three constituent parts of Budapest; the one on the east bank of the River Danube). Karl attended the Piaristengymnasium, where, although Calvinist, he was awarded a scholarship for his exceptional academic performance. He began his artistic career as a pupil of the Hofkapellmeister Destouches, then in the academy of the Venetian master Jakab Marastoni (1804–1860). Later he was a pupil of the historical painters Henrik Weber (1818–1866) in Budapest and Carl Rahl (1812–1865) in Vienna.

Together with Rahl he worked on numerous commissions. Later he started on his own original works, first as a romantic landscape artist in scenes of the Alföld (the Hungarian lowland plain), and then as a creator of monumental murals and frescos in the style of the Venetian master Tiepolo.

After various works in Budapest he became active in Vienna. He laid out plans for a grandiose palace, and completed murals commissioned by the Abbot of Tihany Abbey for his abbey church on the shore of Lake Balaton. He became known for his portraits and nudes, for which both his wife and his daughters (Katarina in particular) posed. Lotz found married bliss only at the age of 58, when he married the widow Jacoboy, the former wife of his brother Paul Johann Heinrich, who had died in 1828. From then on he signed his works Károly Jacoboy-Lotz.

In 1882 Lotz was appointed Professor at various art academies in Budapest, and in 1885 he became dean of a newly established department for women painters. He was an honorary member of the Academy of Pictorial Arts in Vienna.

His last important public commission was the "Apotheosis of the Habsburg Dynasty", a huge ceiling fresco in the Habsburg Room of the newly rebuilt Royal Palace, that he painted in 1903, one year before his death. Lotz was already seriously ill when he worked on the fresco. The "Apotheosis" followed the traditions of Baroque court painting and the work was praised by contemporary critics. The fresco survived the war unscathed, but it was destroyed in the 1950s.

He died in 1904 in Budapest. As a "Prince of Hungarian Artists" he was given a state funeral and interred inside a memorial. His pictures, drawings and sketches were donated to the State of Hungary and are now in the Szépművészeti Múzeum. Several Hungarian cities have streets named after him, there are Hungarian stamps bearing his likeness, and there is a bust in the National Museum in Budapest.

== Painting works ==
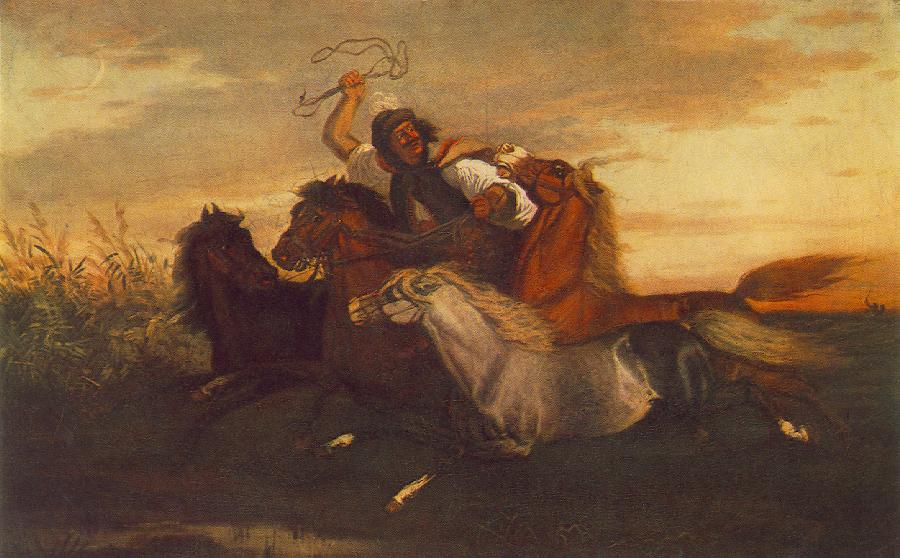
Galloping Outlaw (circa 1857)

- Ceiling of the Budapest Opera (1884)
- Mural in the large ceremonial room of the Hungarian Academy of Sciences in Budapest
- Mural in the stairways of the Hungarian Parliament Building in Budapest (1897)
- Mural in Hungarian National Museum in Budapest (1874)
- Mural in the Redoutensaal (Pesti Vigadó) of Budapest's main concert hall
- Mural in the casino of Theresienstadt (Terezín), the Czech Republic
- Ceiling and mural in St Stephen's Basilica of Budapest as well as the seminary
- "Apotheosis of the Habsburg Dynasty", ceiling fresco in Buda Castle (1903, lost)
- Mural in the main market hall of Budapest
- Mural in the east railway station of Budapest
- Mural in the reading room of the library of Budapest University
- Ceiling and mural in the Matthiaskirche (Church of St. Matthew) in Budapest
- Ceiling and mural in the Justice Palace of Budapest (1894)
- Mural in the Weapons Museum of the Arsenal in Budapest
- Frescos of the Heinrichshof in Vienna (destroyed in WWII)
- Various works at the palace of Earl Károlyi
- Various works at the palace of Baron Weckheim
- Various works at the palace of Baron Lipthay
- Mural for the Tihany at Lake Balaton

== Gallery ==
Paintings by Károly Lotz

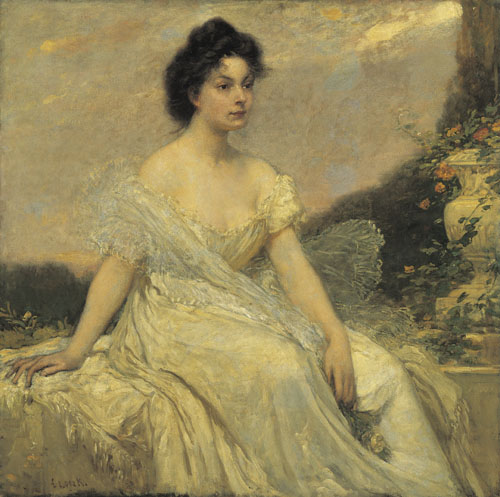
Kornélia Lotz in White (1900)

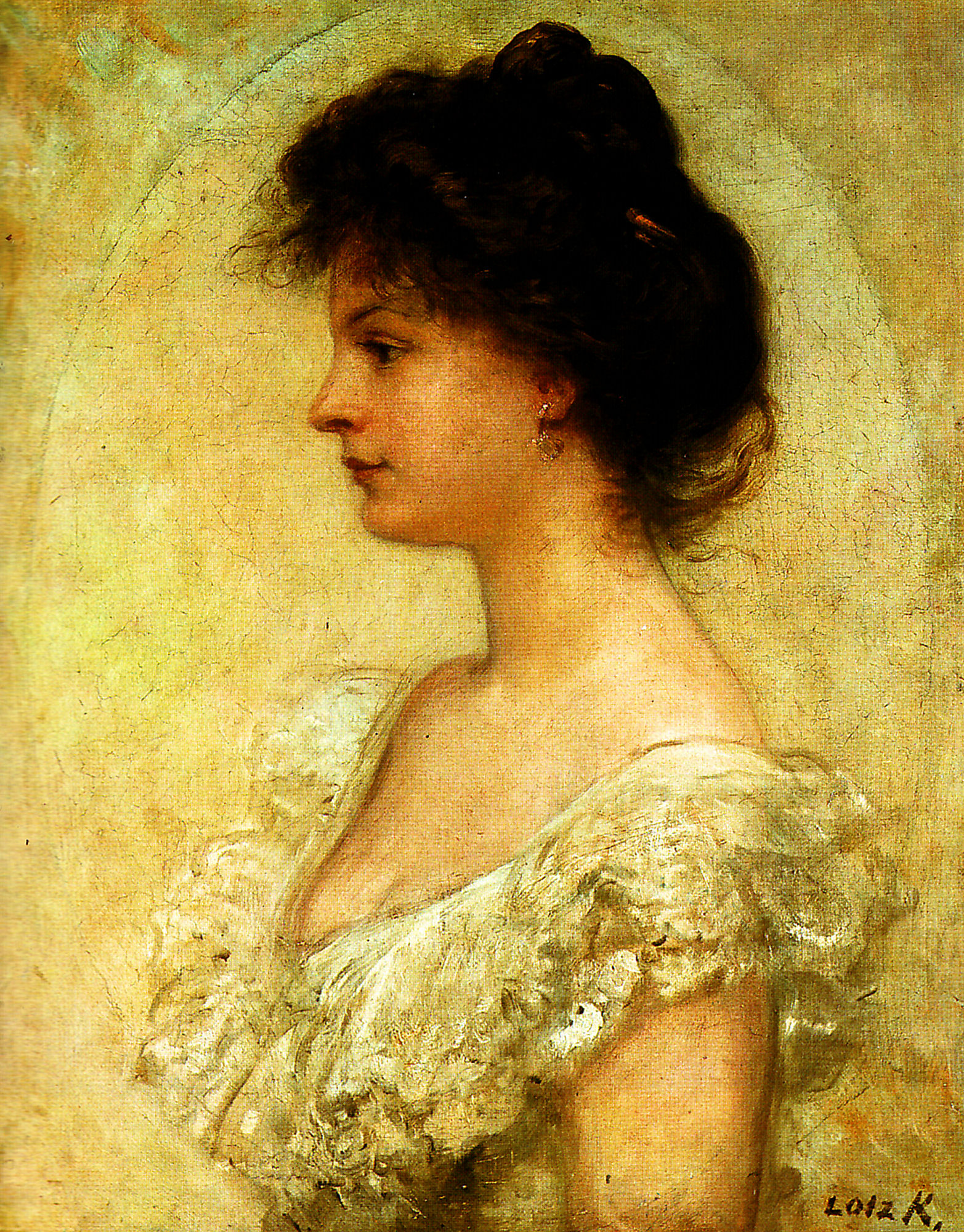
Portrait of Kornélia Lotz (1890)

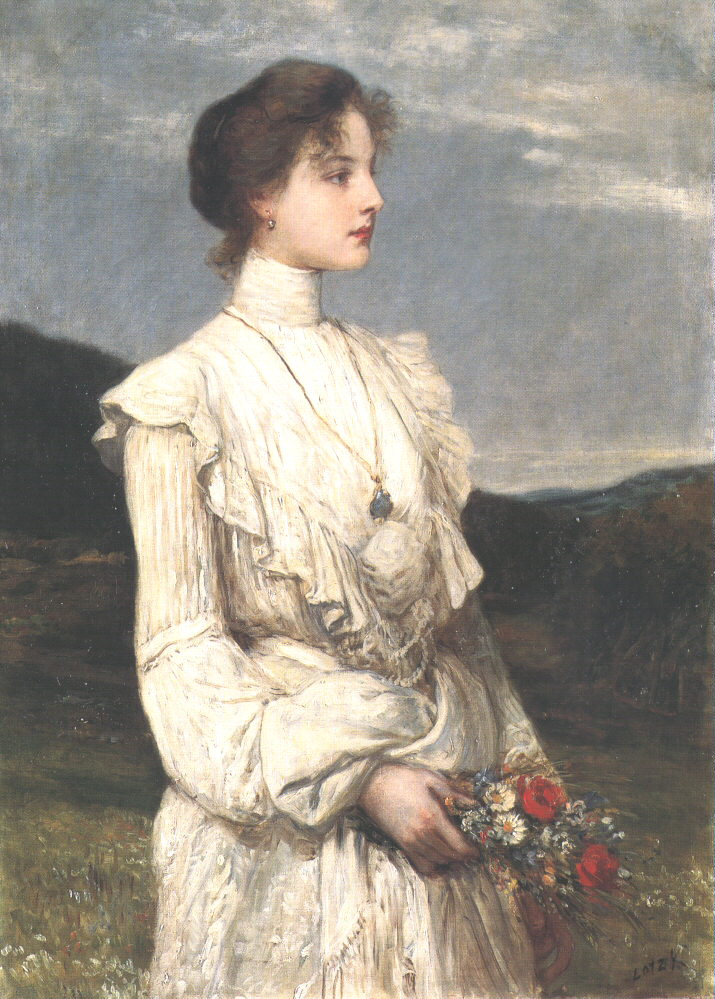
Soring : Portrait of Ilona Lippich (1894)

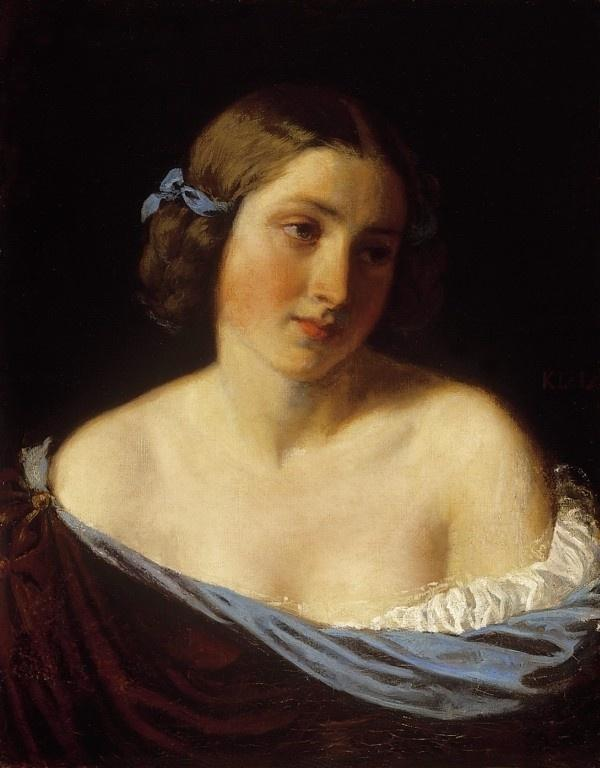
Portrait of a Young Lady

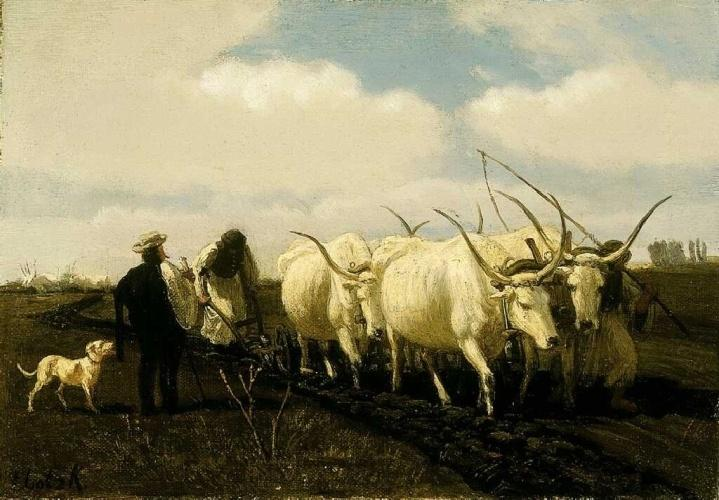
Ploughing at Spring

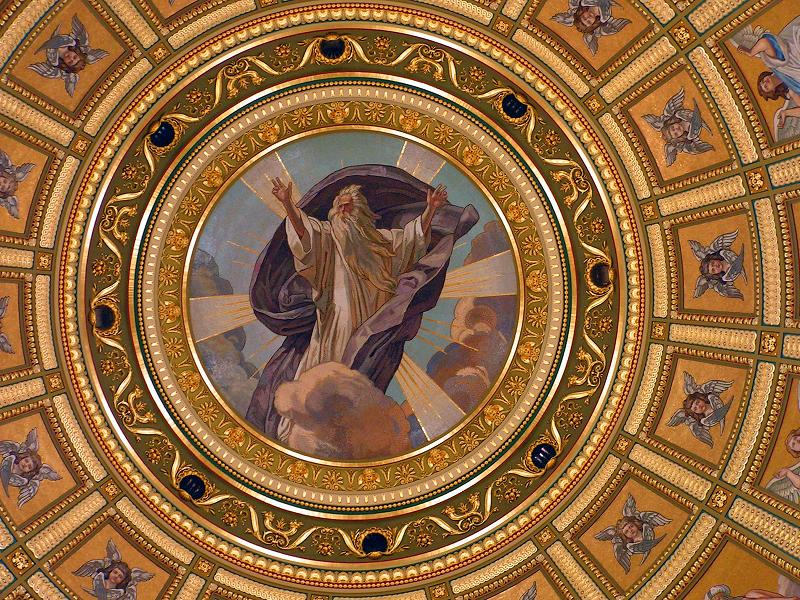
The mosaic of the Saint Stephen's Basilica in Budapest

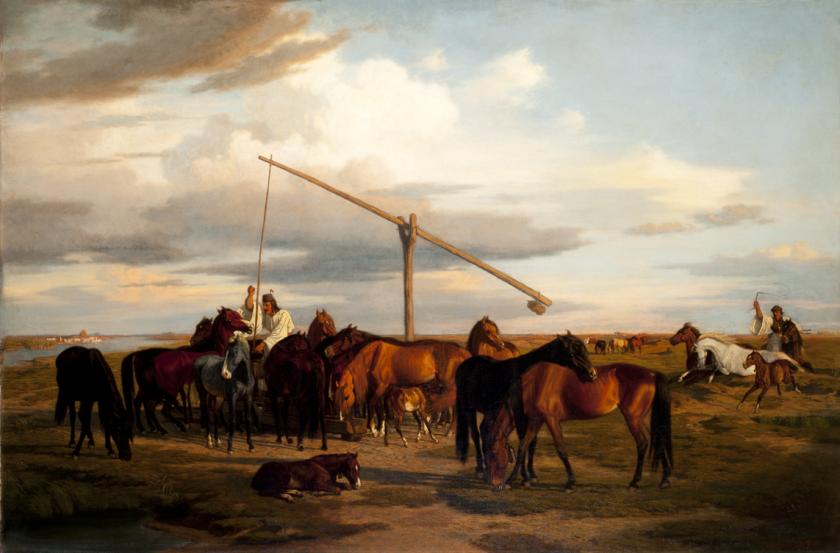
Watering the Horses on the Puszta

== Quotes ==
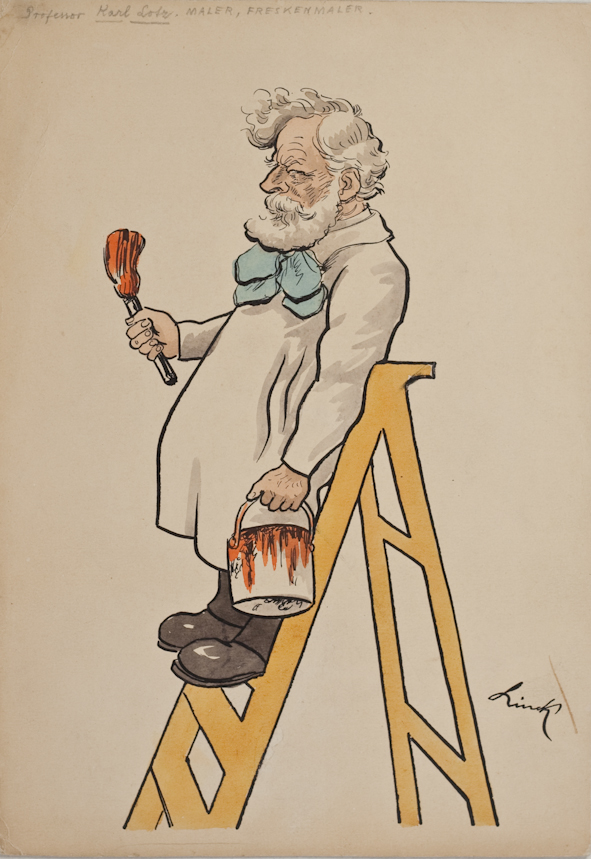
Professor Karl Lotz by Lajos Linek

"...even among more than eighty pupils his gifts, his enthusiasm for Truth and his tireless diligence shone out."

— (Carl Rahl writing about Karl Lotz und Moritz Than in a letter to the Budapest architect Feßl, 28 April 1863)

"Though born in Bad Homburg vor der Höhe, he belongs to Hungary by virtue of his Hungarian-born mother and his family's residence in this country. Generously endowed in every other way, only luck and a commensurate material success have been denied him; he remains almost hidden, despite his rare genius."

— (August George-Mayer, a school-friend of Carl Rahn, on his fellow pupil Karl Lotz, in 1883)
