= Mór Than =

Hungarian painter

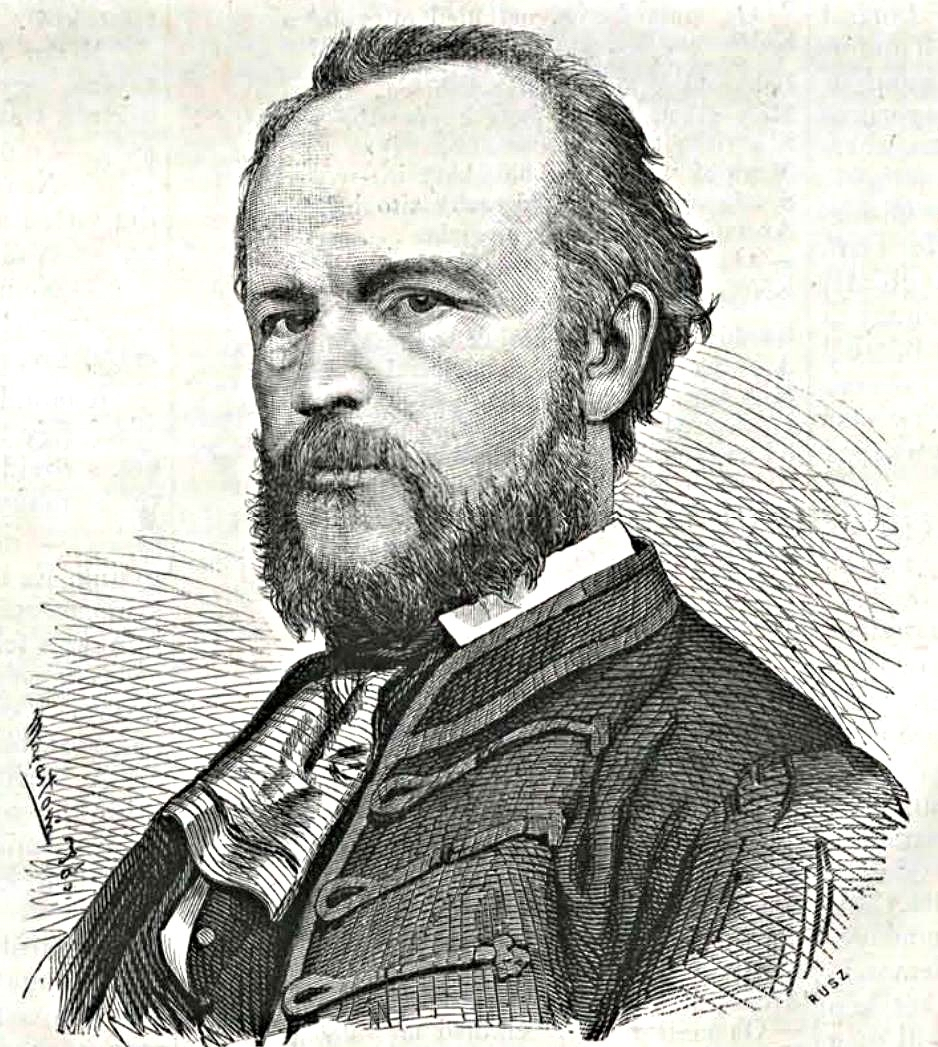
- Contemporaneous etching of Mór Than, by Károly Rusz
- Born: 19 June 1828
- Died: 11 March 1899 (aged 70)

Mór Than (Hungarian: [ˈtɒn ˈmoːr]; 19 June 1828 – 11 March 1899) was a Hungarian painter. He painted in the Realist school and worked with several high-profile Hungarian and Austrian painters of his time. He travelled around Italy, France, and his native Hungary. Later in life, he worked for several museums and galleries in Hungary.

== Biography ==
Born at Óbecse (today Bečej, Serbia) to his father János Than of Abbot (1789–1858), a royal treasurer, and mother Ottilia Setényi. He attended high school in Kalocsa, in present-day Hungary and then studied philosophy and law in the current-day Budapest. He became a student of painting under Miklós Barabás.

His studies were interrupted, and during the 1848 revolution he became a war painter alongside Arthur Görgei. Later, due to illness, he was not conscripted into the imperial army. As a lawyer, he drew an entire album filled with objects drawn from Hungarian history, and after the conflict, he pursued an artistic career. He traveled to Vienna, where he continued his studies under Austrian painter, Karl Rahl. In 1855, he traveled to Paris and then travelled back to Italy. Eventually he returned home in the early 1860s and opened a studio.

From 1864 he worked alongside Károly Lotz on the murals of the Vigadó of Pest, and from 1875, he created the murals of the stairwell of the Hungarian National Museum together with Lotz.

In 1885, he moved to Italy, and then returned to Hungary in 1890, from which, between 1890 and 1896, he became the guardian of the gallery of the National Museum, and, in 1896, he briefly became the director of the National Gallery (before the foundation of the Museum of Fine Arts). He died in Trieste in 1899.

=== Legacy ===
He was a Realist painter who worked in the pre-Impressionist style. His subjects were mostly historic events and portraits but also mythological or fantasy themes. He painted frescos which decorate several prominent public buildings in Budapest.

Than also designed the first Hungarian postage stamp, which was supposed to be distributed after the Hungarian Revolution. However, the uprising failed, and the Hungarian State led by Lajos Kossuth collapsed; the printing presses were subsequently destroyed by Austrian authorities.

== Gallery ==
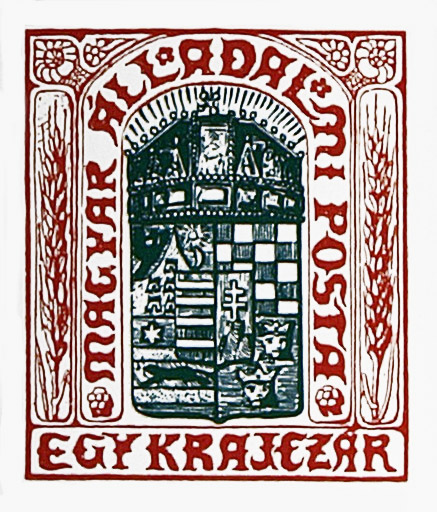
Postage stamp design, 1848

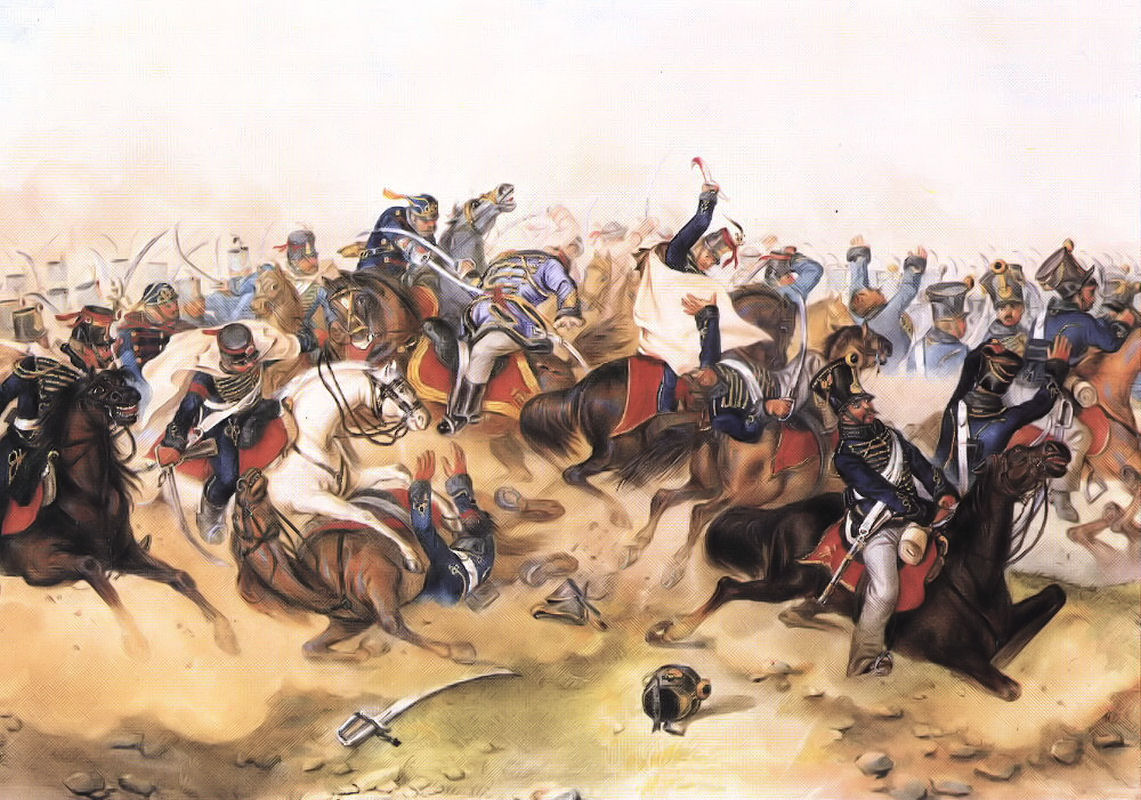
Battle of Tápióbicske, painted 1849–1850

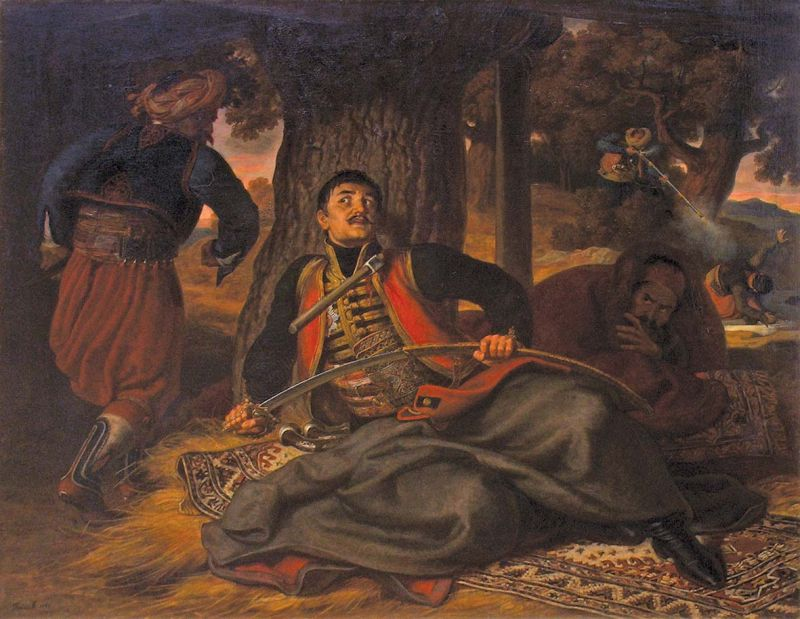
The Assassination of Karađorđe (1863), National Museum of Serbia

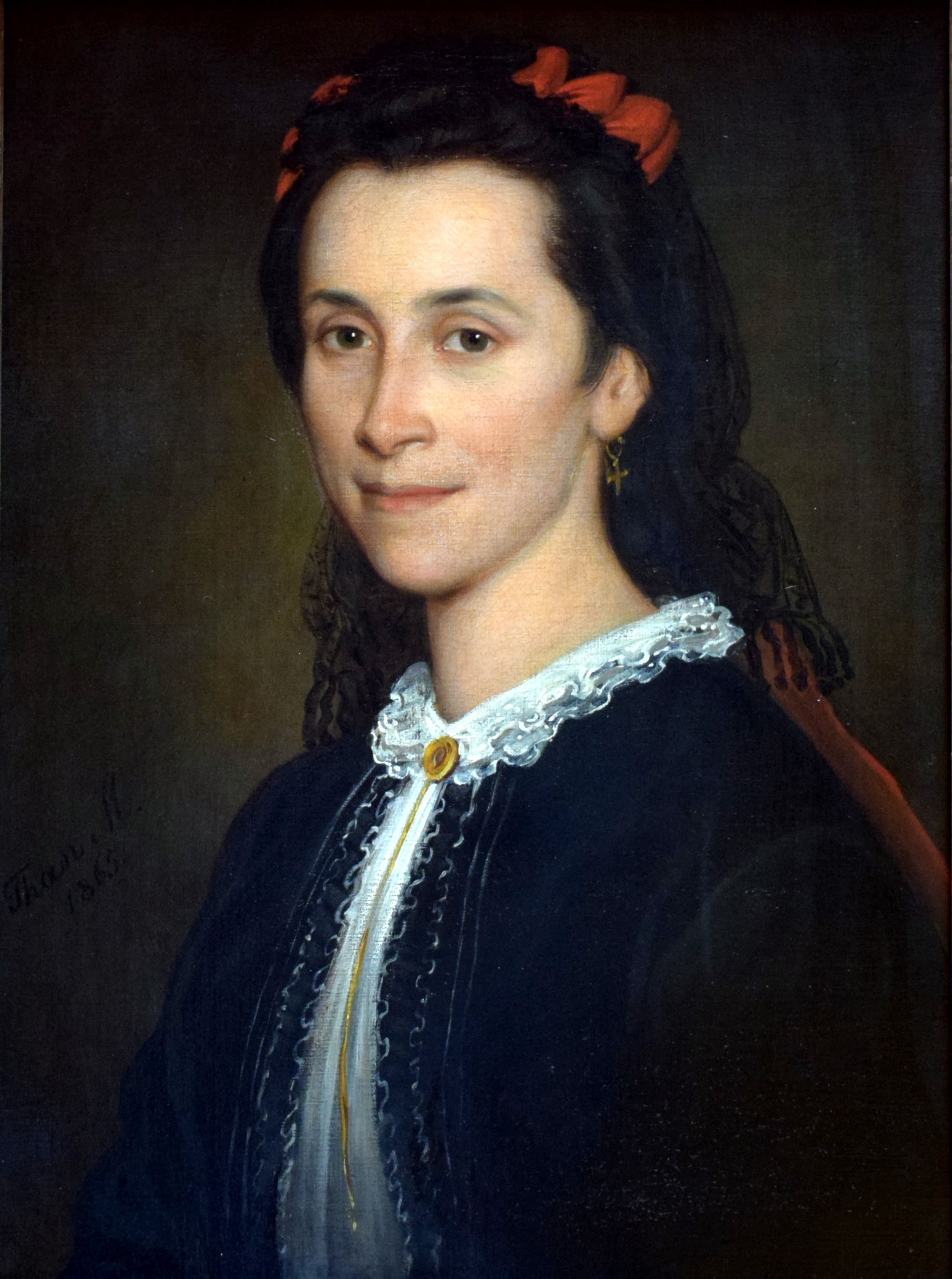
Portrait of Ágnes Rosty (1865)

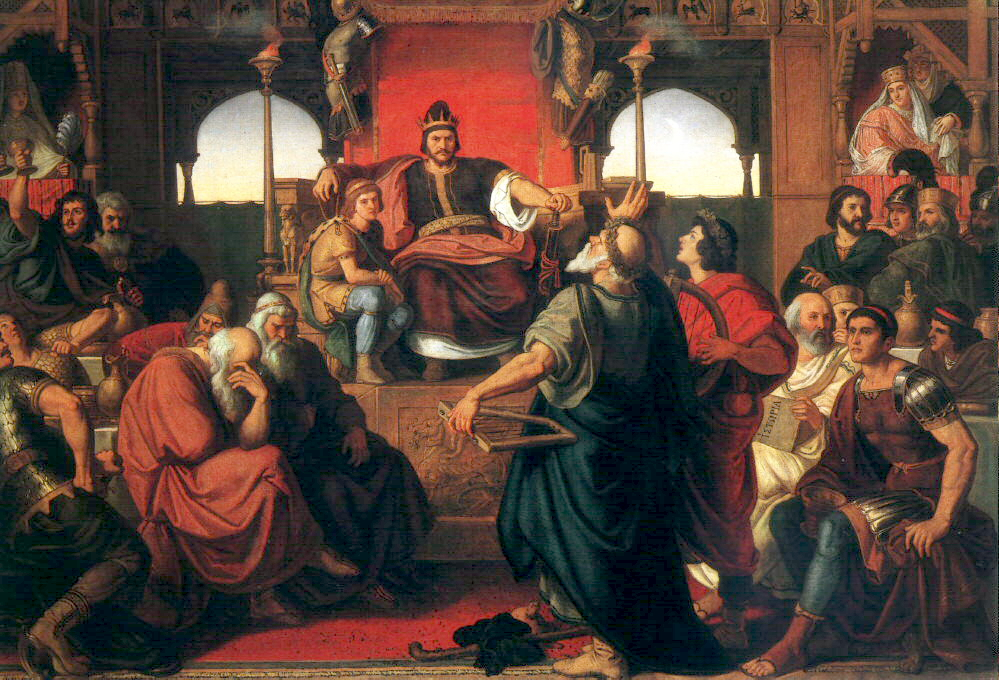
The Feast of Attila (1870), at the Hungarian National Gallery, Budapest

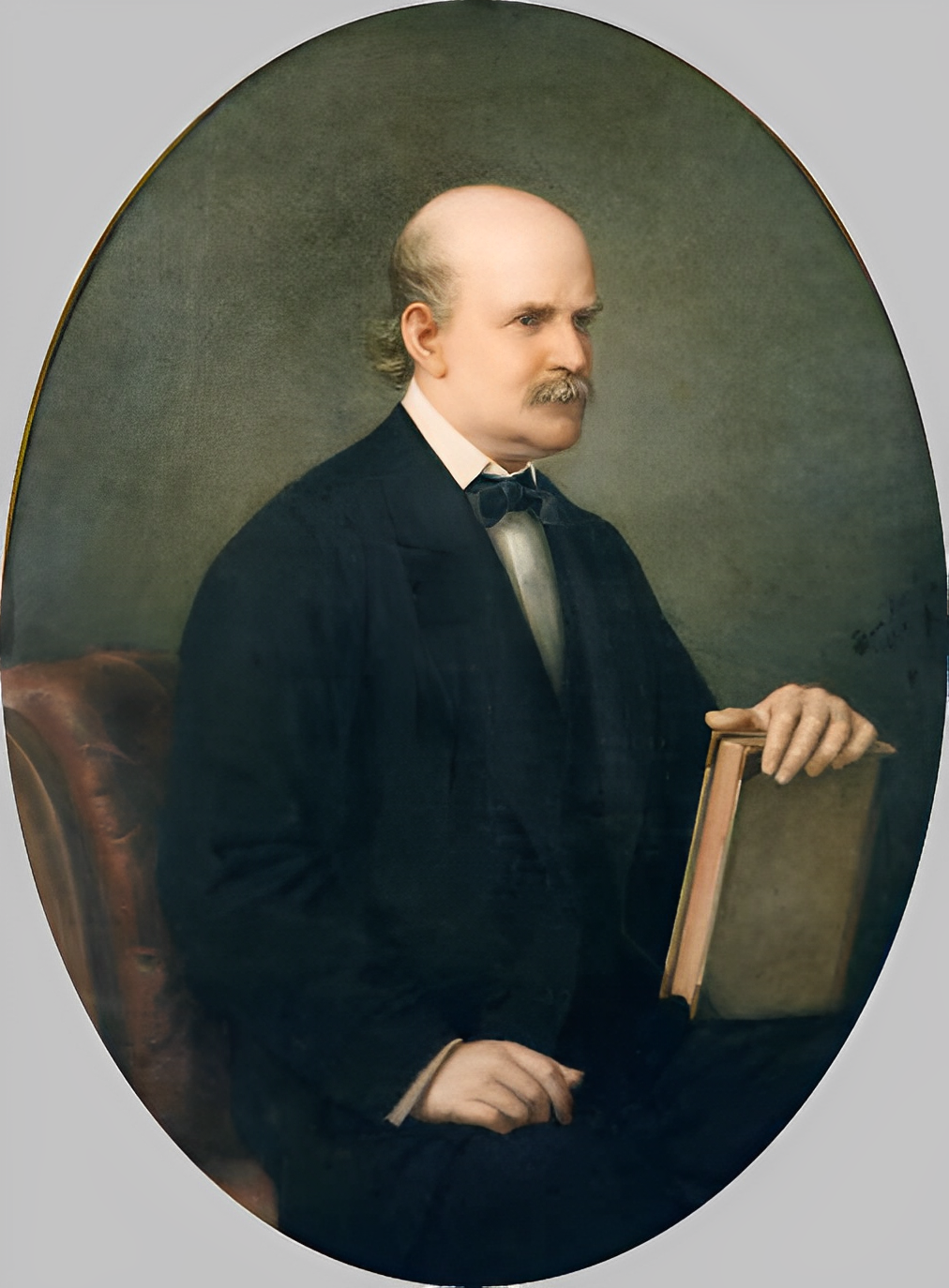
Portrait of Ignác Semmelweis (1884), at the Semmelweis University, Budapest

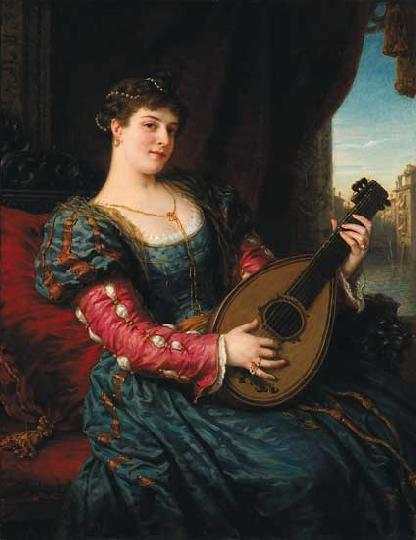
Young Woman Wearing a Renascence Dress, 1886 (private collection)
