= Hornstein, Austria =

Hornstein
- Municipality
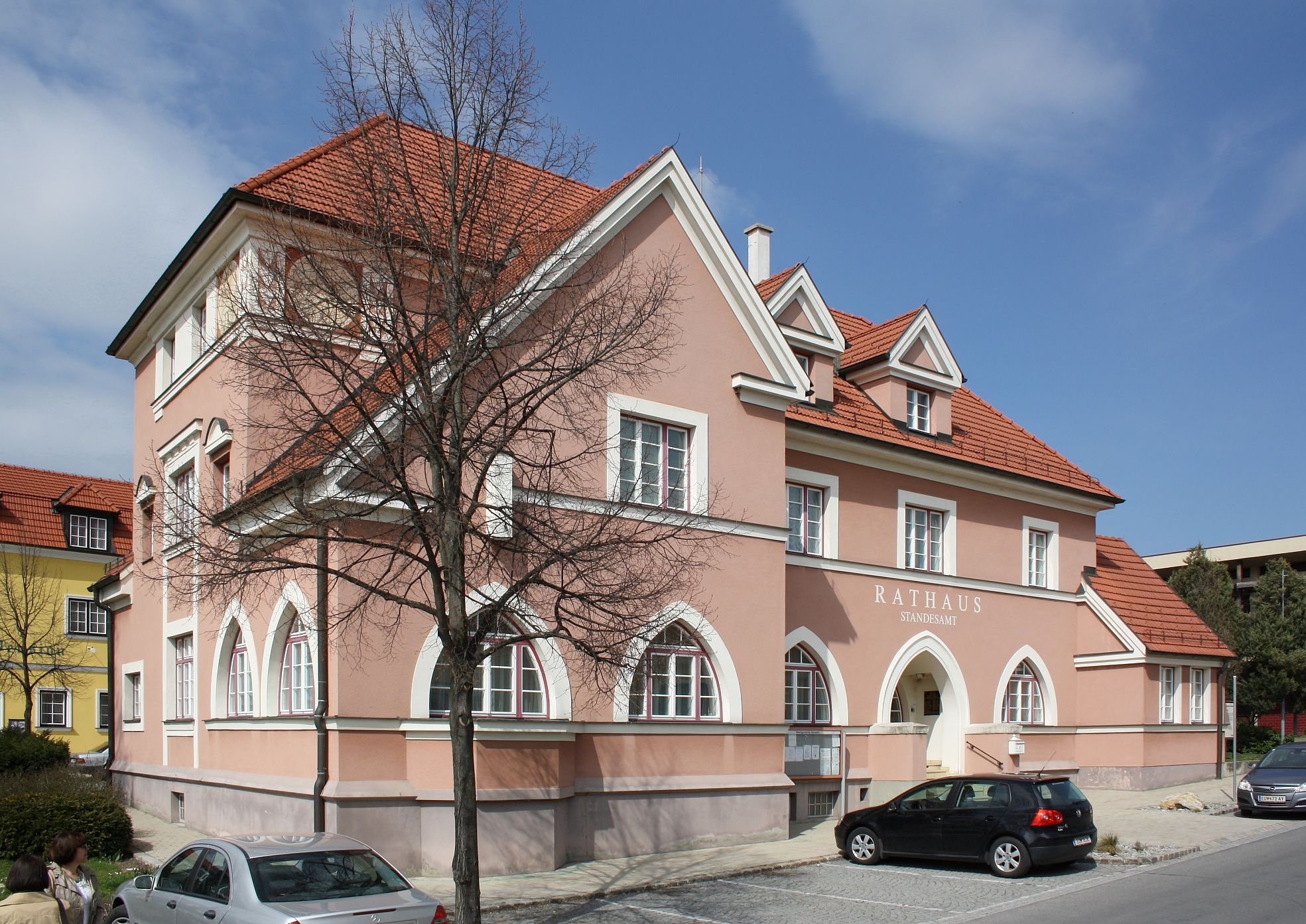
- Town hall

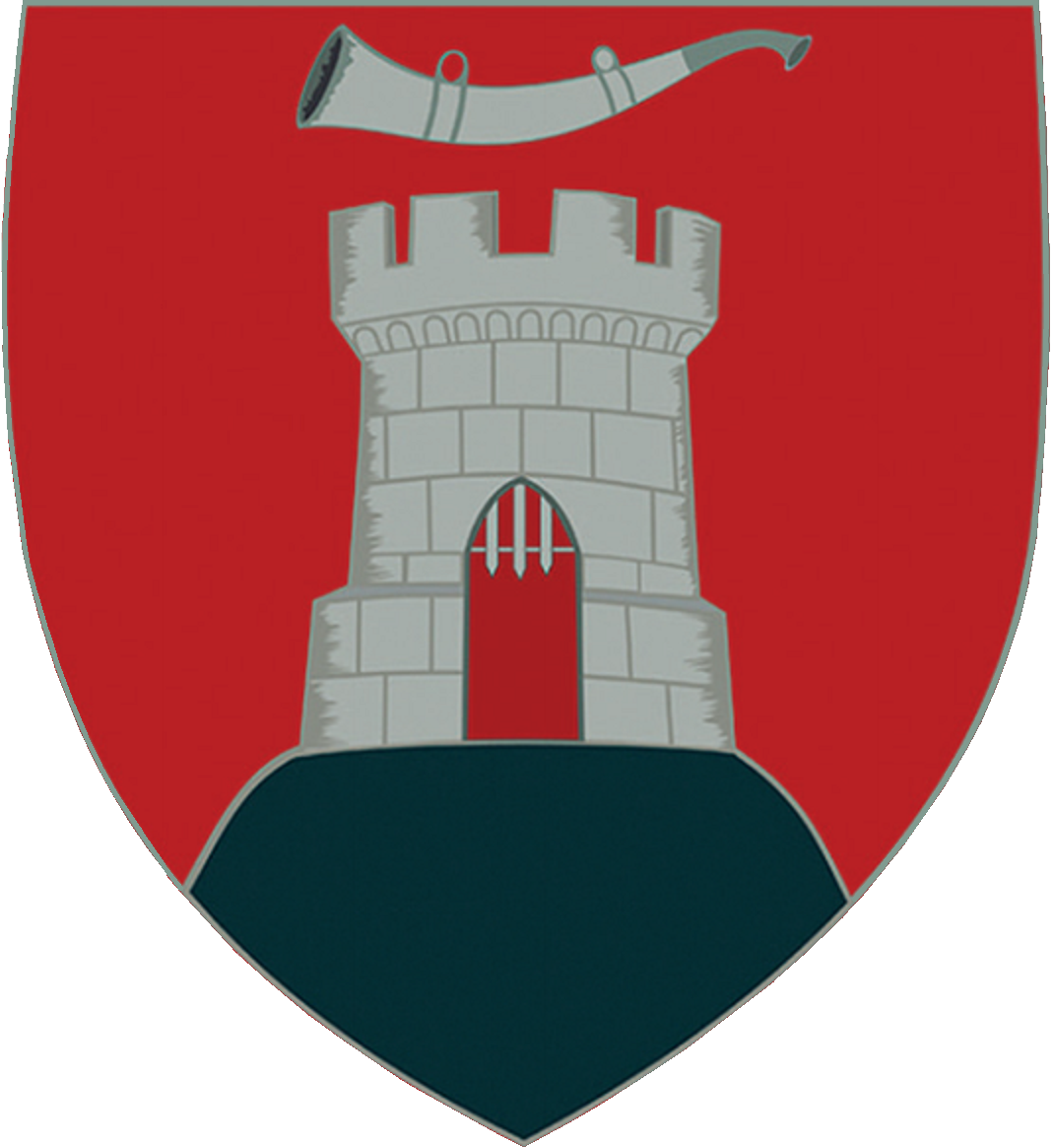
- Coat of arms

- Location within Burgenland Location within Austria
- Coordinates: 47°52′N 16°26′E
- Country: Austria
- State: Burgenland
- District: Eisenstadt-Umgebung

Government
  - Mayor: Christoph Wolf (ÖVP)

Area
  - Total: 37.07 km^{2} (14.31 sq mi)
- Elevation: 273 m (896 ft)

Population (2022-01-01)
  - Total: 3,217
  - Density: 86.78/km^{2} (224.8/sq mi)
- Time zone: UTC+1 (CET)
  - Summer (DST): UTC+2 (CEST)
- Postal code: 2491, 7053
- Area code: +43 2689
- Website: www.hornstein.at

Hornstein (Croatian: Vorištan, Hungarian: Szarvkő) is a town in the district of Eisenstadt-Umgebung in the Austrian state of Burgenland.

== Population ==
Historical population
Year	Pop.	±%
1869	1,989	—
1880	2,150	+8.1%
1890	2,246	+4.5%
1900	2,416	+7.6%
1910	2,549	+5.5%
1923	2,520	−1.1%
1934	2,473	−1.9%
1939	2,454	−0.8%
1951	2,373	−3.3%
1961	2,362	−0.5%
1971	2,328	−1.4%
1981	2,258	−3.0%
1991	2,593	+14.8%
2001	2,640	+1.8%
2011	2,764	+4.7%
2021	3,176	+14.9%

== Culture ==
- Tamburica Vorištan, Croatian tamburica orchestra

== Notable people ==
- Wilhelm Schmied (1910-2000), Salesian, musician and music pedagogue, missionary in Macao (1939-1966)

== Gallery ==
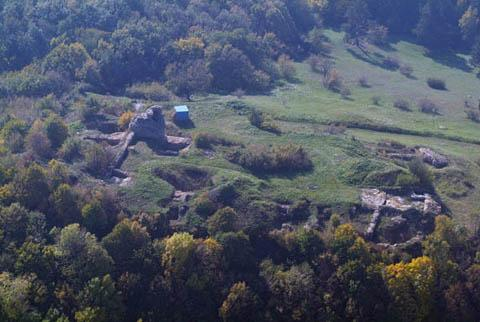

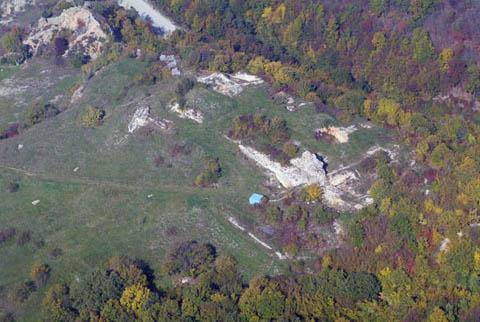

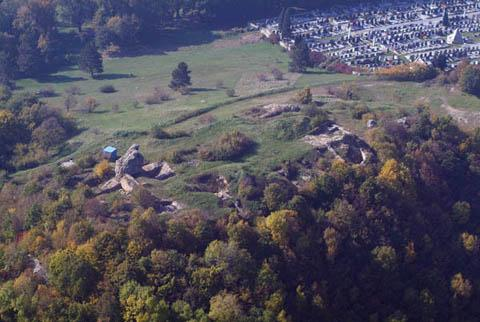
