= Palais Todesco =

Coordinates: 48°12′11″N 16°22′12″E

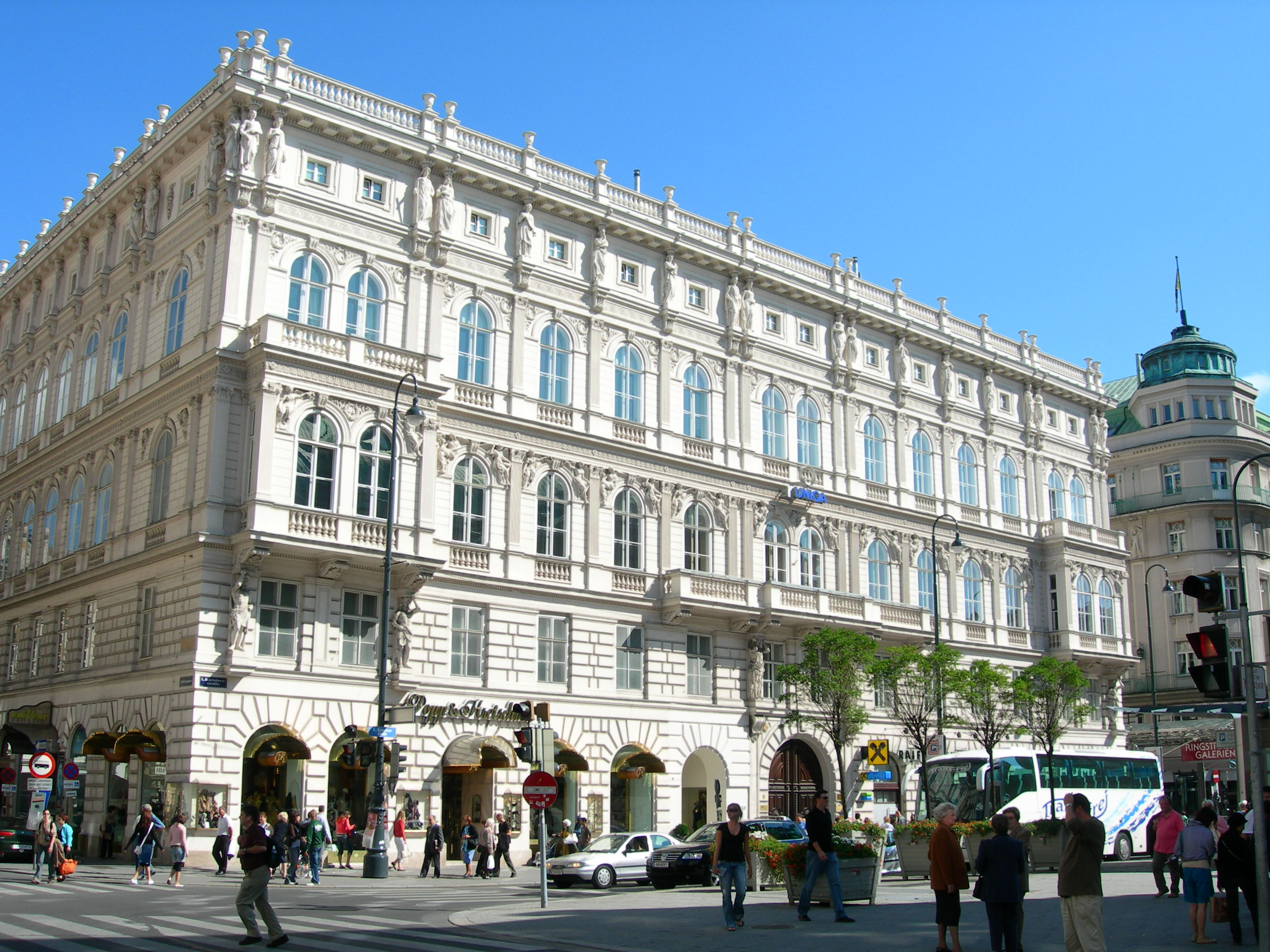
Palais Todesco next to the Vienna State Opera

Palais Todesco is a Ringstraßenpalais in Vienna, Austria, constructed from 1861 to 1864 on plans by architect Theophil Hansen.

== History ==
It was built for the aristocratic Todesco family. One of the inhabitants was Baroness Sophie von Todesco, who established a renowned salon for artists and intellectuals.

The palace served as the headquarters of the Austrian People's Party from 1947 to 1995.
