= List of Austrian artists and architects =

This is a list of notable Austrian artists and architects.

== A ==
- Josef Abel (1768–1818), painter
- Erika Abels d'Albert (1896–1975), painter and graphic designer
- Offerus Ablinger (1983-), painter and performance artist
- Raimund Abraham (1933–2010), architect
- Soshana Afroyim (1927–2015), painter
- Joseph Matthäus Aigner (1818–1886), painter
- Oz Almog (born 1956), painter and writer
- Franz Alt (1821–1914), artist, watercolorist
- Rudolf von Alt (1812–1905), painter
- Friedrich von Amerling (1803–1887), painter
- Christian Attersee (born 1940), pop-art artist

== B ==
- Ferdinand Bauer (1760–1826), botanical illustrator
- Herbert Bayer (1900–1985), graphic designer, typographer, photographer, painter, architect
- Franz von Bayros (1866–1924), erotic artist
- Maria Bach (1896–1978), painter
- Antonietta Brandeis(1849–1910), painter
- Roswitha Bitterlich (1920–2015), painter, graphic artist, sculptor, and writer
- Arik Brauer (1929–2021), painter; born in Vienna
- Günter Brus (1938-2024), performance artist
- Tina Blau (1845–1916), landscape painter

== C ==
- Bernhard Cella (born 1969), conceptual artist; born in Salzburg
- Eduard Charlemont (1848–1906), impressionist painter; born in Vienna
- Isabel Czerwenka-Wenkstetten (born 1969), visual artist

== D ==
- Günther Domenig (1934–2012), architect
- Gerti Deutsch (1908–1979), photographer
- Karl Duldig (1902–1986), Austrian-Australian sculptor

== E ==
- Joachim Eckl (born 1962), artist
- Albin Egger-Lienz (1868–1926), painter
- Bettina Ehrlich (1903–1985), painter and illustrator
- Fanny Elssler (1810–1884), dancer
- Ursula Endlicher, multi-media
- Johann Bernhard Fischer von Erlach (1656–1723), architect
- Valie Export (born 1940), media artist

== F ==
- Bernd Fasching (1955–2021), painter and sculptor; born in Vienna
- Marina Faust (born 1950), photographer
- Thomas Feuerstein (born 1968), media artist, bio artist, sculptor
- Josef Frank (1885–1967), architect
- Emil Fuchs (1866–1929), sculptor, medallist, painter
- Ernst Fuchs (1930–2015), painter and sculptor; born in Vienna
- Joseph von Führich (1800–1876), painter; born in Kratzau, Austria-Hungary
- Hortensia Fussy (born 1954), sculptor

== G ==
- Richard Gerstl (1883–1908), painter
- Bruno Gironcoli (1936–2010), sculptor; born in Villach
- Gareis, Fritz (1872–1925), artist and cartoonist for the leftwing Vienna
- Hilda Goldwag (1912–2008), painter
- Johannes Grenzfurthner (born 1975), founder of monochrom
- Eva Grubinger (born 1970), installation artist
- Nilbar Gures (born 1977), multi-media

== H ==
- Ernst Haas (1921–1986), photographer
- Jasmin Hagendorfer, installation artist, sculpturer, performance artist
- Alice Berger Hammerschlag (1917–1969), abstract painter
- Karin Hannak (born 1940), multi-media
- Edith Tudor Hart (1908–1973), photographer and spy
- Karl Freiherr von Hasenauer (1833–1894), architect
- Johann Hattey (1859–1904), architect
- Rudolf Hausner (1914–1995), painter and graphic artist
- Xenia Hausner (born 1951), painter
- Gottfried Helnwein (born 1948), artist; born in Vienna
- Kurt Hentschlager (born 1960), new media artist; born in Linz
- Louis Christian Hess (1895–1944), painter and sculptor
- Joseph Hickel, Austrian portraitist and court painter to the Habsburg Holy Roman Emperor Joseph II
- Johann Lukas von Hildebrandt (1668–1745), architect
- Adolf Hitler (1889–1945), painter
- Josef Hoffmann (1870–1956), architect
- Hans Hollein (1934–2014), architect
- Wilhelm Holzbauer (1930–2019), architect
- Carl Holzmann (1849–1914), architect
- Clemens Holzmeister (1886–1983), architect
- Alfred Hrdlicka (1928–2009), sculptor and graphic artist; born in Vienna
- Friedensreich Hundertwasser (1928–2000), artist; born in Vienna

== I ==
- Nicky Imber (1920–1996), sculptor

== K ==
- Arnold Karplus (1877–1968), Viennese architect
- Dora Kallmus (1881–1963), photographer
- Manfred Kielnhofer (born 1967), designer and sculptor
- Ernestine von Kirchsberg (1857–1924), painter
- Franz Klein (1779–1840), sculptor; creator of bust of Beethoven
- Gustav Klimt (1862–1918), artist; prominent figure of the Vienna Secession
- Hubert Klumpner (born 1965), architect; born in Salzburg
- Kiki Kogelnik (1935–1997), pop-art painter
- Oskar Kokoschka (1886–1980), painter; born in Pöchlarn, Lower Austria
- Sacha Kolin (1911–1981), painter
- Kevin Kopacka (born 1987), painter and film director
- Michaela Konrad (born 1972), contemporary artist
- Edith Kramer (1916–2014), painter and art therapist
- Siegfried L. Kratochwil (1916–2005), Viennese painter
- Alfred Kubin (1877–1959), painter (graphics)
- Max Kurzweil (1867–1916), artist; co-founder of the Vienna Secession
- Elke Krystufek (born 1970), painter
- Felicitas Kuhn (1926–2022), illustrator

== L ==
- Joseph Lanzedelly the Elder (1772–1831), lithographer
- Maria Lassnig (1919–2014), painter; born in Vienna
- Roberta Lima (born 1974), video and performance artist
- Adolf Loos (1870–1933), architect
- Josef Lorenzl (1892–1950), sculptor

== M ==
- Marianne Maderna (born 1944), sculptor and illustrator
- Anna Mahler (1904–1988), sculptor
- Hans Makart (1840–1884), history painter, designer and decorator
- Anton Erhard Martinelli (1684–1747), architect
- Domenico Martinelli (1650–1719), architect
- Franz Martinelli (1651–1708), architect
- Johann Baptist Martinelli (1701–1754), architect
- Georg Mayer-Marton (1897–1960), artist
- Gustav Mezey (1899–1981), painter of large scale posters
- Edgar Meyer (1853–1925), painter and political activist
- Josef Mikl (1929–2008), abstract painter
- Elizabeth Burger Monath (1907–1986), painter and illustrator
- Inge Morath (1923–2002), photographer
- Koloman Moser (1868–1918), artist
- Otto Muehl (1925–2013), artist, action art
- Ulrike Müller (born 1971), mixed-media artist

== N ==
- Moritz Nähr (1859–1945), photographer
- Christian Heinrich Nebbien (1778–1841), landscaping architect
- Richard Neutra (1892–1970), architect; emigrated to the United States
- Hans Niessenberger
- Hermann Nitsch (1938–2022), painter and performance artist; born in Vienna

== P ==
- Gustav Peichl (1928–2019), architect
- Hubert Petschnigg (1913–1997), architect
- Martina Pippal (born 1957), painter, sculptor and art historian
- Boris Podrecca (born 1940), architect
- Alf Poier (born 1967), artist and stand-up comedian
- Jakob Prandtauer (1660–1726), architect
- Wolf Prix (born 1942), architect
- Thomas Pucher (born 1969), architect

== R ==
- Arnulf Rainer (1929–2025), painter
- Elise Ransonnet-Villez (1843–1899), painter
- Barbara Rapp (born 1972), painter and mixed-media artist
- Erwin Redl (born 1963), LED installation artist and painter
- Lily Renée (1921–2022), illustrator and writer
- Lili Réthi (1894–1969), artist and illustrator
- Lucie Rie (1902–1995), potter
- Anton Pius Riegel (1789–18??), architect
- Felice Rix-Ueno (1893–1967), textile artist
- Anton Romako (1832–1889), painter
- Johann Michael Rottmayr (1656–1730), Baroque painter
- Bernard Rudofsky (1905–1988), designer, architect and social critic

== S ==
- Stefan Sagmeister (born 1962), graphic designer and typographer
- Karin Schäfer (born 1963), performance artist
- Martina Schettina (born 1961), mixed media artist
- Egon Schiele (1890–1918), painter
- Rudolf Schindler (1877–1953), architect; emigrated to the United States in 1914
- Lene Schneider-Kainer (1885–1971), painter
- Barbara Schurz (born 1973), performance artist and writer
- Paul Schuss (born 1948), painter and mixed media artist; emigrated to France in 1949
- Margarete Schütte-Lihotzky (1897–2000), architect and political activist
- Karl Schwanzer (1918–1975), architect
- Hans Schwarz (1922–2003), artist
- Rosa Schweninger (1849–1918), painter
- Moritz von Schwind (1804–1871), painter
- Florian Seidl (born 1979), vehicle designer
- Harry Seidler (1923–2006), architect; emigrated to Australia in 1948
- Günther Selichar (born 1960), media artist / photographer
- Deborah Sengl (born 1974), painter and sculptor
- Santino Solari (1576–1646), architect
- Martina Steckholzer (born 1974), artist
- Adalbert Stifter (1805–1868), painter, pedagogue, poet and writer
- Ceija Stojka (1933–2013), painter, writer and musician
- Marianne Stokes (1855–1927), painter
- Jörg Streli (1940–2019), architect
- Helmut Swiczinsky (1944–2025), architect

== T ==
- Johann Joseph Thalherr (1730–1801), architect
- Ottilie Tolansky (1912–1977), painter
- Hede von Trapp (1877–1947), painter, illustrator and poet
- Esin Turan (born 1970), sculptor and painter

== U ==
- Carola Unterberger-Probst (born 1978), painter, installations, experimental films, digital art

== W ==
- Aloys Wach (1892–1940), painter
- Otto Wagner (1841–1918), Jugendstil architect behind much of turn-of-the-century Viennese architecture
- Ferdinand Georg Waldmüller (1793–1865), painter
- Peter Weibel (1944–2023), media artist
- Max Weiler (1910–2001), painter
- Susanne Wenger (1915–2009), painter and sculptor
- Franz West (1947–2012), artist
- Olga Wisinger-Florian (1844–1926), painter
- Fritz Wotruba (1907–1975), sculptor; born in Vienna
- Marie Elisabeth Wrede (1898–1981), painter
- Erwin Wurm (born 1954), sculptor

== Z ==
- Stefan Zsaitsits (born 1981), artist
- Roman Zenzinger (1903–1990), commercial designer and painter; born in Olmuetz
- Liane Zimbler (1892–1987), architect and interior designer
- Lisbeth Zwerger (born 1954), illustrator

== See also ==
- List of painters from Austria
- List of architects
- List of Austrians
- List of Austrian women artists
- List of Austrian women photographers
- Lists of artists
- ART.Welten, an Austrian artists' association
