= Offerus Ablinger =

Austrian artist

- Offerus Ablinger, 2025
- Born: 1983 (age 42–43); Upper Austria, Austria
- Education: Academy of Fine Arts Vienna
- Known for: Painting, performance art, installation, video art, stage design

Offerus Ablinger (born 1983) is an Austrian artist working in painting, performance, installation and video art. His paintings, particularly the Trans/Masc series, explore queer representations of masculinity through fragmented bodies, technological modification and cyborg imagery. His work addresses the relationship between bodily identity, social norms and transhumanism, drawing on both traditional portraiture and speculative images of the human body.

== Education ==
Ablinger was born in Upper Austria in 1983. He studied contextual painting at the Academy of Fine Arts Vienna under Ashley Hans Scheirl, graduating with distinction in 2020. His graduation work received nominations for both the Academy Prize and the Kunsthalle Prize.

== Work ==
Painting forms a central part of Ablinger's practice. His ongoing Trans/Masc series consists of portraits of figures drawn from queer subcultures, frequently depicted as partially nude or technologically altered bodies. The works employ techniques associated with traditional European portrait painting, while bodily fragments, abstract elements and mechanical extensions interrupt the apparent realism of the figures.

The series deals with the social construction of gender, particularly masculinity, and with the changing boundaries of the human body. In an interview published by the Academy of Fine Arts Vienna, Ablinger described the paintings as combining historical painting techniques with contemporary subjects and speculative futures. He also discussed the preparatory interviews and photographic sessions with his models, which inform their subsequent transformation in the paintings.

Ablinger collaborated with Jasmin Hagendorfer on performance and installation projects under the name Offerus Ablinger/Hagendorfer, also known as GrobSchlechtig. Their work explored gender identity, social conventions and post-pornographic imagery.

In 2021, Ablinger collaborated with Hidéo SNES on Transmutation, exhibited during Vienna Art Week at the Creative Cluster Wien. The project combined Ablinger's paintings with an artificial intelligence system programmed by SNES, which used the paintings as source material for new images. The collaboration examined the distinction between human and machine creativity, extending the cyborg motif from the depicted bodies to the artistic process itself.

In April 2025, Queer Art Spaces Vienna presented Ablinger's paintings in a solo presentation at Art Düsseldorf. The works were described by artmagazine as hybrid male nudes combining classical poses with an aesthetic associated with artificial intelligence.

== Reception ==
Critical writing on Ablinger's Trans/Masc series has focused on the instability of bodily boundaries and the representation of masculinity. The paintings combine traditional techniques with figures whose bodies appear incomplete, fragmented or in the process of technological transformation. In his essay "Konzentrierte Queerness", historian Andreas Brunner examined the contrast between the realistic rendering of skin and the white backgrounds from which the figures appear to emerge or into which they seem to disappear. He interpreted the transition between flesh, abstraction and cyborg forms as a visual expression of changing gender identities. Drawing on Susan Sontag's writing on camp, Brunner also connected the exaggerated poses and theatrical presentation of the bodies to voguing, drag and other forms of queer subcultural performance. In this reading, queerness is expressed through the paintings' formal construction as well as their subject matter.

The treatment of the male figure has also been considered in relation to older traditions of portraiture. Art historian Kero Fichter compared Ablinger's paintings with early 16th-century Venetian portraits of young men, in which clothing, jewellery, posture and the direction of the gaze could convey sensuality without explicit erotic representation. Fichter identified comparable uses of objects and bodily presentation in Ablinger's work, where chains, restraints and other attributes complicate conventional readings of masculinity. His comparison places the portraits within a longer history of male self-presentation and the visual codes through which sexuality is suggested or concealed.

The cyborg imagery in Trans/Masc has also been discussed in relation to technological modification and the social regulation of bodies. Writing in the 2026 anthology Plug & Play, Jasmin Hagendorfer, who had previously collaborated with Ablinger, examined the figures' artificial skin, biomechanical extensions and ambiguous position between utopian and dystopian visions of the body. In the same volume, Johannes Grenzfurthner approached the paintings through the history of industrial labour, technological prostheses and the changing social expectations placed on male bodies. His essay relates the cyborg figures to a historical tension between physical strength, economic productivity and technological power.

Ablinger's work was featured in the 2024 ORF documentary Gender, Queer, Wir – Identität im Wandel, which examined changing conceptions of gender and identity. The programme presented Trans/Masc in connection with portraits of people from queer subcultures and the questioning of established masculine stereotypes.

== Selected exhibitions ==
- 2015: Aufgerissenen Auges: Transmanieristische Reaktionen, xhibit, Academy of Fine Arts Vienna.
- 2021: Transmutation, with Hidéo SNES, Vienna Art Week, Creative Cluster Wien.
- 2023: TRANS / MASC, Galerie Atelier Roland Puschitz, Vienna.
- 2025: trânsformâre, Schlumberger Kellerwelten, Vienna.
- 2025: Solo presentation with Queer Art Spaces Vienna, Art Düsseldorf.
- 2026: HARD FEELINGS – Bodies Becoming Desire, Porn Film Festival Vienna, Semperdepot, Vienna.
- 2026: Queer Art Prize 2026, exhibition of nominated artists, Qwien – Centre for Queer History, Vienna.

== Selected filmography and video art ==
- Homophobia (2012) – production design and costumes, credited as Christoph Ablinger.
- Kunstkarusselfahren bis zum Erbrechen (2013) – co-director.
- Pink Panic (2017) – co-director, writer, performer.
- Ich bin all das nur das nicht (2021) – co-director.
- Fudliaks! Zerfetzt die Geschlechter! (2021) – art department.
