= Attersee =

Attersee may refer to:

- Attersee (lake), a lake in Austria
- Attersee am Attersee, a town near that lake

== People with the surname ==
- Christian Attersee (born 1940), Austrian painter
