= Homophobia (disambiguation) =

Homophobia describes a range of negative attitudes and feelings towards homosexuality.

Homophobia may also refer to:

- Homophobia (song), a single by British band Chumbawamba
- Homophobia (film), an Austrian short film
