= Mezey =

Mezey is a surname. Notable people with the surname include:

- Gustav Mezey, Austrian artist
- György Mezey (1941–2025), Hungarian footballer and coach
- Naomi Mezey, American legal scholar and law professor
- Paul Mezey, New York-based independent producer and founder of Journeyman Pictures
- Robert Mezey (1935–2020), American poet, critic, and academic
