= Gregor Schmidinger =

Austrian screenwriter and director (born 1985)

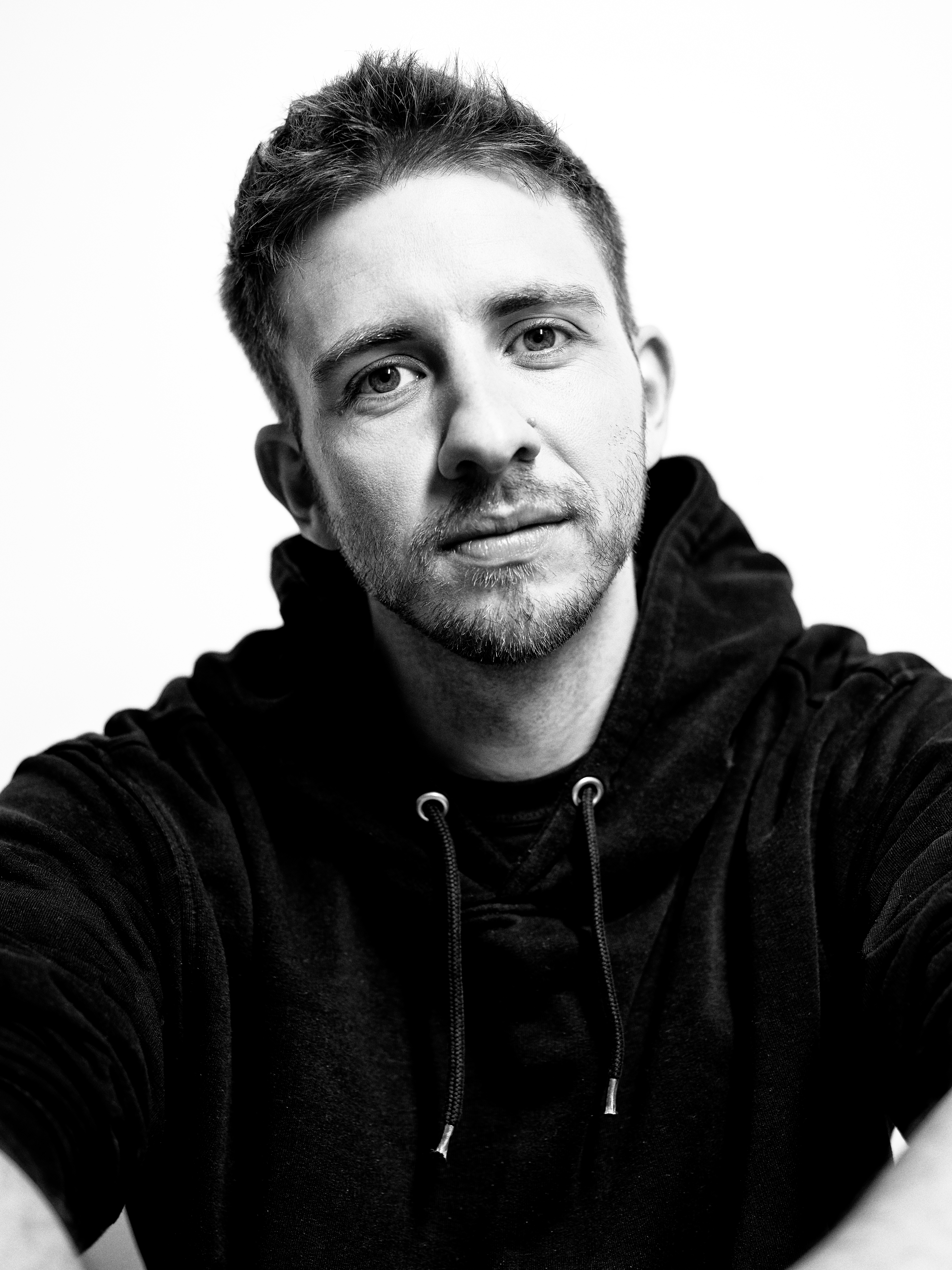
- Born: 16 April 1985 (age 41); Linz, Austria
- Occupations: Director; Screenwriter
- Notable work: Nevrland (2019)
- Website: Official website

Gregor Schmidinger (born 16 April 1985) is an Austrian screenwriter, director, and podcaster. He is best known for his 2019 feature film Nevrland (2019), as well as for his short film Homophobia (2012).

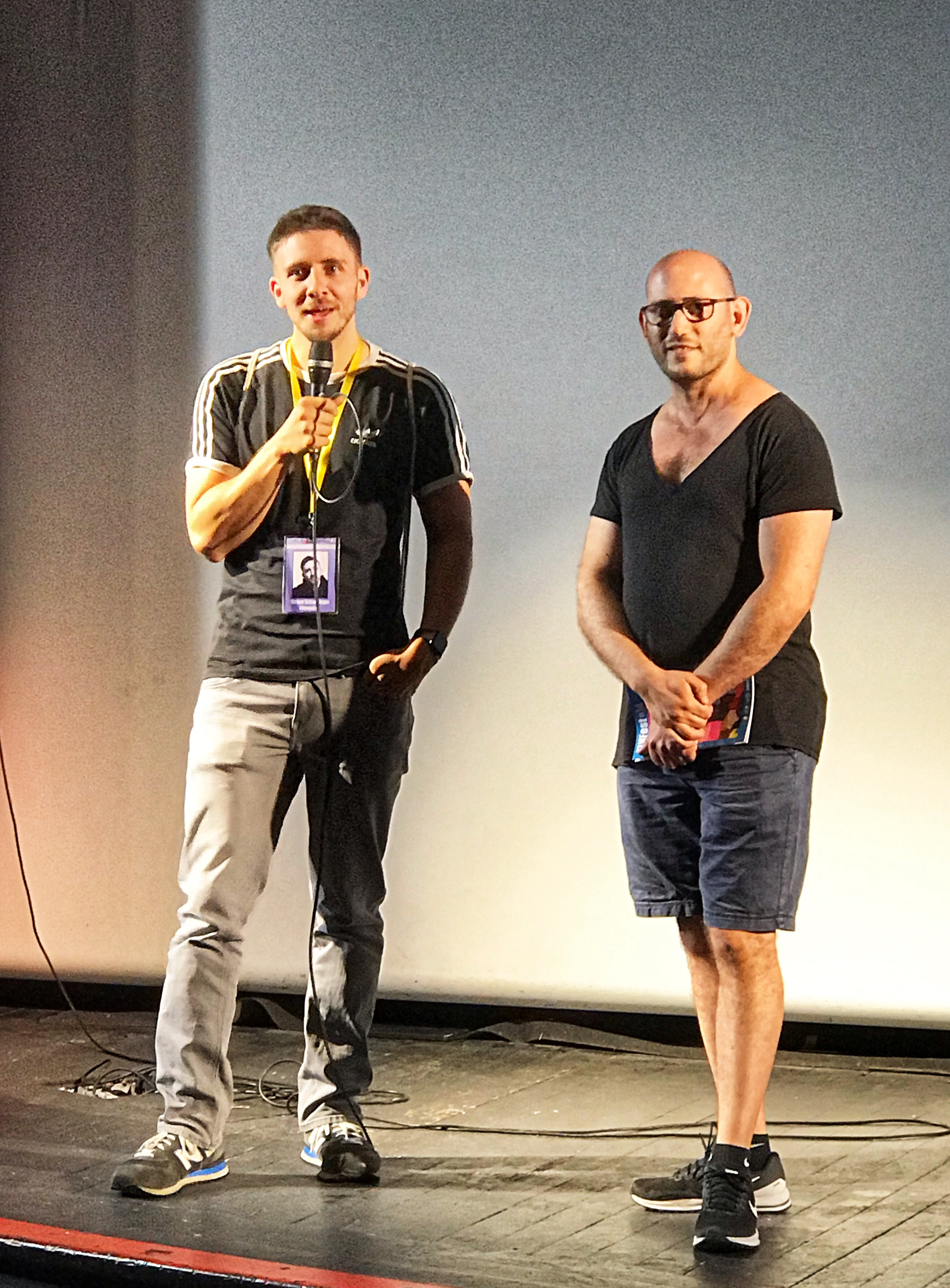
Gregor Schmidinger (left) with Yair Hochner at TLVFest

== Life and work ==
Schmidinger studied Digital Television at the University of Applied Sciences Salzburg. He wrote his diploma thesis about Transmedia Storytelling, and studied screenwriting at the University of California, Los Angeles. He is member of the Austrian Directors Guild and the Austrtian Screenwriters Guild.

=== As a filmmaker ===
Schmidinger's films deal with mental health and LGTB issues. His first short films, The Boy Next Door (2008) and Homophobia (2012), have combined more than 15 million views on YouTube. One of his inspirations for Homophobia was the suicide of Jamey Rodemeyer in 2011, attributed to bullying due to his homosexuality, and a video Rodemeyer had submitted for the Internet-based 501(c)3 non-profit It Gets Better Project. Although the title of the film was deemed generic by the audience, Schmidinger defended it as it "provides a way of reaching a broader audience with a single word: search engine optimization meets art".

His first feature film, Nevrland, premiered at the film festival Max Ophüls Preis in Saarbrücken. It won the Best Youth Jury Award, as well as in the Best Young Actor category. Nevrland deals with the story of Jakob, a teenager who works at a slaughterhouse, and is struggling with a debilitating anxiety disorder. He encounters the 26-year-old artist Kristjan on a cam-chat sex site, a confrontation that, according to the Saarbrücker Zeitung, "opens the door into the depths of his fantasies and fears."

=== Film festival work ===
Schmidinger is co-founder of the Porn Film Festival Vienna. The festival is aiming to bridge the gap between feminist and queer theory, art, and pornography.

=== Podcaster ===
Schmidinger is producing and hosting a podcast that explores gay culture in Vienna, titled 'Warme Brüder.'

== Filmography ==
- 2008: The Boy Next Door (short film)
- 2012: Homophobia (short film)
- 2019: Nevrland (feature)

== Awards ==
- 2019: Max-Ophüls Preis Youth Jury Award for Nevrland - 40th Filmfestival Max-Ophüls Preis
- 2019: Thomas-Pluch Spezialpreis der Jury for Nevrland - Diagonale 2019
- 2019: Best International Narrative for Nevrland - TLVFest 2019
- 2019: Best Feature Film for Nevrland - Filmfestival Kitzbühel 2019
- 2019: Youth Jury Award for Nevrland - Heimatfilmfestival 2019
