= Porn Film Festival Vienna =

Annual film festival in Austria

- Logo (2025)
- Genre: Pornography
- Begins: 2018
- Frequency: Annual
- Location: Vienna
- Country: Austria
- Founders: Yavuz Kurtulmus; Jasmin Hagendorfer; Gregor Schmidinger; Saif Rangwalla
- Most recent: 2025
- Next event: 2026
- Major events: Film screenings, debates, exhibitions
- Website: www.pffv.at

Porn Film Festival Vienna (PFFV) is an annual pornographic film festival held in Vienna, Austria, with the aim of promoting early career erotic film-makers, from Austria and beyond, to local audiences. The festival was first held in 2018. Feminist pornography, sex positivism and LGBTQ+ pornography are key thematic strands of the festival.

== Background ==
Founded by Yavuz Kurtulmus, Jasmin Hagendorfer, Gregor Schmidinger and Saif Rangwalla, the festival was inspired by the Porn Film Festival Berlin. The idea for a dedicated erotic film festival developed from a popular "porn night" presented as part of the Transition Festival. A precursor event for the first edition of the festival was held at the Schikaneder Cinema in Vienna in 2017. The program included the documentary Pornocracy by Ovidie, as well as selected short films.

The festival had caused controversy within the Viennese arts and culture sector prior to its first iteration in 2018. The Freedom Party of Austria (FPÖ) investigated as to whether taxpayer contributions had funded the festival - a claim denied by the organisers. Due to the COVID-19 pandemic, the festival was held as a hybrid event in October 2020, both in person and online.

In 2026, the festival's public funding came under scrutiny in Austria after politicians from the right-wing Freedom Party of Austria (FPÖ) publicly criticized the federal subsidy.

== Programme ==
Porn Film Festival Vienna (PFFV) explicitly screens pornographic short and feature films targeted to both heterosexual and LGBTQ audiences. The 2018 edition had the theme "What is porn?" Festival programmes may include discussions, debates and documentaries on sex-positive topics. One example was a panel debate on porn addiction at the 2018 edition of the festival. Another example of sex positivism is the screening of The Artist & The Pervert featuring the BDSM partnership of Georg Friedrich Haas and Mollena Williams-Haas, as the opening film in 2019. Film showings may be followed by live interviews with the filmmakers. From its inception, there has been an exhibition and engagement programme alongside. The festival's audiences come from a range of backgrounds and all ages, including people from "feminist, queer, working-class and kinky communities".

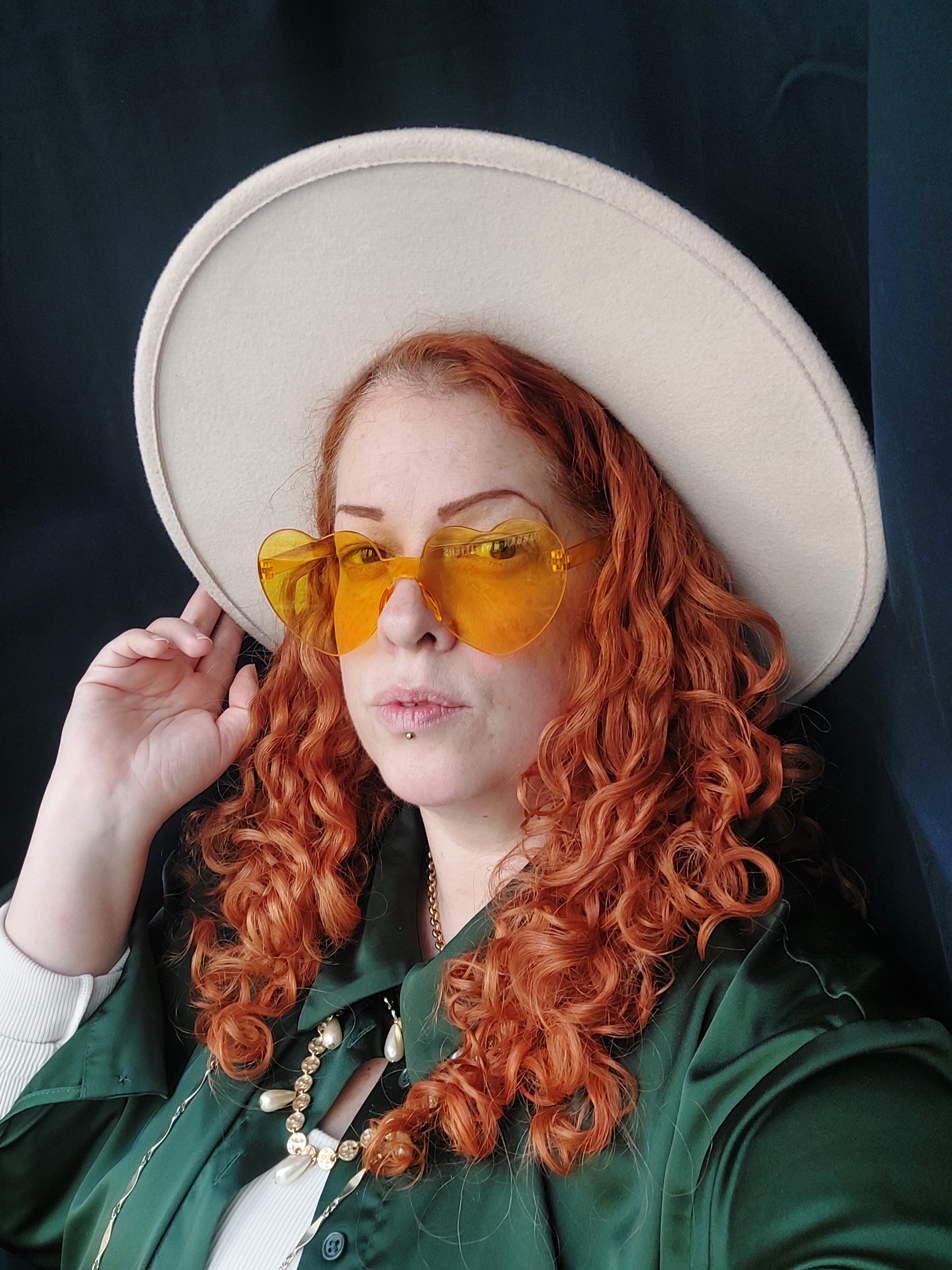
Jasmin Hagendorfer (November 2025)

Feminist pornography is also a key pillar of the festival. Founder Jasmin Hagendorfer described her philosophical approach as follows:

Feminist porn productions demonstrate that female pleasure and sexual sensation can indeed be central, and that porn can be women-, gender-, and ultimately men-friendly. Furthermore, many feminist productions stand for fair working conditions, participation, and consent, which are often lacking in mainstream productions. It's important to show that porn is produced by women for women and that it reaches a broad audience.

In 2025 festival organisers described how access was increasingly important as a theme of the festival; the preceding year the festival screened a film in complete darkness, so only audio was a stimulus. In 2025 the festival also organised its first session on AI and sexuality.

== Partnerships ==
Special programs of PFFV were shown at the International Queer & Migrant Film Festival in Amsterdam. In cooperation with Arse Elektronika, screenings have also been organized at betalevel in Los Angeles, and at The Nook in Orlando.
