= Fritz Gareis =

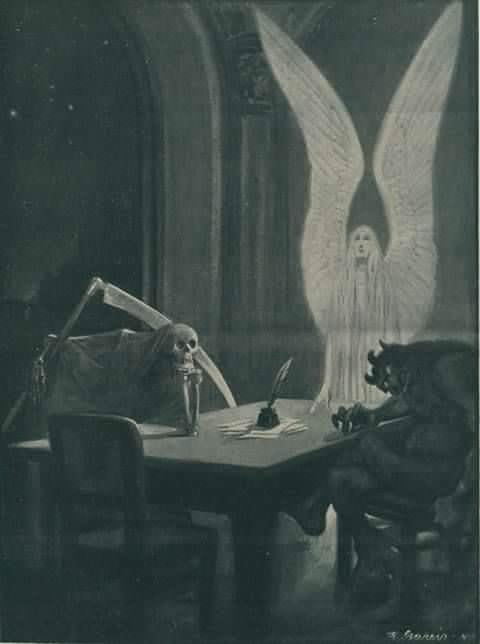
- "In Anticipation" from Die Muskete 23 March 1916 by Fritz Gareis
- Born: Fritz Gareis; 21 October 1872 Vienna, Austria-Hungarian Empire
- Died: 5 October 1925 (aged 52) Vienna, Austria
- Areas: Cartoonist, Editor
- Notable works: Bilderbogen des kleinen Lebens

Fritz Gareis (1872 – 1925) was an Austro-Hungarian artist and cartoonist for the left-wing Vienna satirical magazine Götz von Berlichingen. He drew a comic titled 'Bilderbogen des kleinen Lebens.' His father of the same name (1845–1903) was also an artist.

== WWI ==
During the First World War, Fritz Gareis contributed to the Imperial Austro-Hungarian war effort by creating donation stamps, propaganda postcards and posters.

== Bilderbogen des kleinen Lebens ==
Gareis wrote Bilderbogen des kleinen Lebens or “Scenes from ordinary life” about the fictional Riebeisel family. Paul M. Malone an associate professor at the University of Waterloo claims that it was the first comic strip with speech balloons in Germany and might be the first regularly appearing comic with speech balloons in continental Europe. Gareis started the comic on 2 November 1923 and it became so popular that after his death on 5 October 1925, and two-month hiatus, the strip continued with Karl Theodor Zelger drawing it until 1934.

== See also ==
- List of Austrian artists and architects
- Aftermath of World War I
- 1910s in comics

== Bibliography ==
Notes

References

- Denscher, Bernhard (April 28, 2015). "Fritz Gareis junior". Austrian Posters.
- Lambiek (2018-08-01). "Fritz Gareis Jr".
- Malone, Paul M. (June 28, 2017). "The European Continent's First Comic Strip?". Germans Make Comics Too.
- Spielvogel, Jackson J. (2013). Western Civilization: A Brief History, Volume II: Since 1500. PUBLISHER. ISBN 9781285500317.
