= Kiki Kogelnik =

Austrian visual artist (1935–1997)

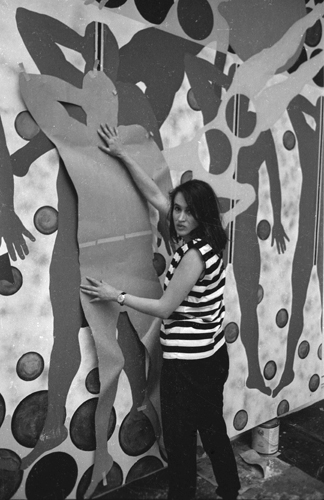
- Kiki Kogelnik, 1960s
- Born: January 22, 1935; Graz, Austria
- Died: February 1, 1997 (aged 62); Vienna, Austria
- Burial place: Bleiburg, Austria
- Education: Vienna Academy of Fine Arts
- Known for: Painting sculpture printmaking
- Spouse: George Schwarz (m. 1966)
- Children: 1

Kiki Kogelnik (January 22, 1935 – February 1, 1997) was an Austrian-American painter, sculptor and printmaker. She moved from Vienna to New York City in 1962. Kogelnik is considered an important pop artist, despite having been known to take issue with being considered part of the pop art movement.

== Early life and education ==
Kiki Kogelnik was born on January 22, 1935, in Graz, Austria. She studied at the Vienna Academy of Fine Arts (or Academy of Fine Arts Vienna). Kogelnik moved to New York City in 1962.

== Life and work: 1960s ==
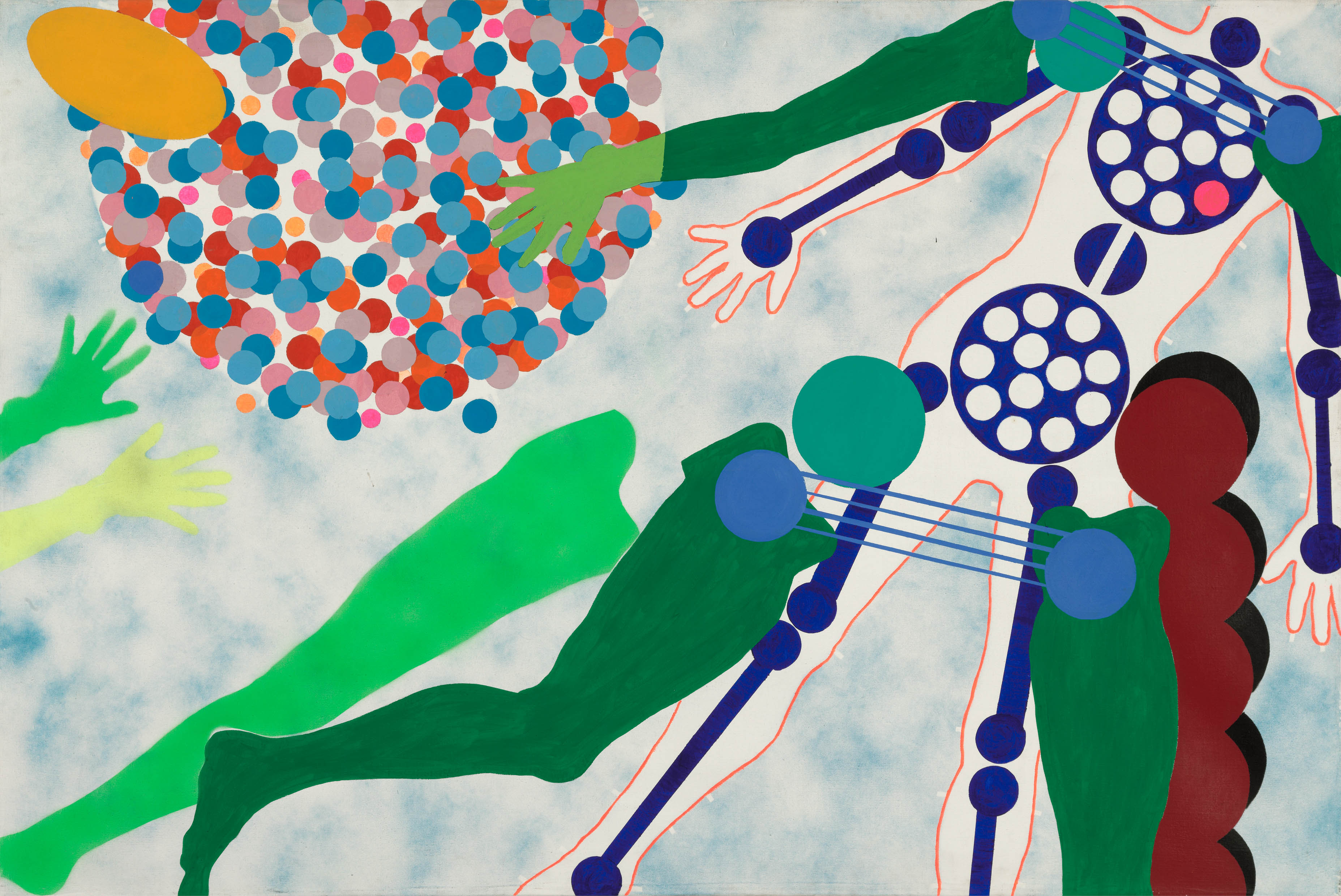
Female Robot, 1964, by Kiki Kogelnik, oil and acrylic on canvas, 48½ inches × 72½ inches (123 × 184 cm). Kiki Kogelnik Foundation.

Kogelnik began her career at the Galerie Nächst St. Stephan in Vienna in 1961, showing abstract works. At the time she was influenced by Serge Poliakoff of the École de Paris, but later found her own unique genre while surrounded by the pop art movement in New York. At one point she was engaged to Austrian abstract expressionist artist Arnulf Rainer.

Kogelnik was close to another abstract expressionist, the American artist Sam Francis, and spent time with him in 1961 in New York and Santa Monica, California. Kogelnik then moved to New York in 1962 where she joined a close-knit group of artists that included Roy Lichtenstein, Claes Oldenburg, Andy Warhol, Larry Rivers, Tom Wesselmann, Joan Mitchell, Robert Rauschenberg and Jasper Johns. Pop was a way of life and, with her unusual hats and outfits, Kogelnik became a captivating happening wherever she went.

Her work during that time was strongly influenced by the pop art colors and materials of the time, producing numerous brightly colored euphoric space-themed paintings. Unlike pop artists, she avoided the celebration of commerce or quotidian objects, although she was known to foreground plastics and the artificial over nature.

During the early 1960s Kogelnik began to use life-size cutout paper stencils of her friends to produce her paintings. In 1965 these prototype cut-outs became vinyl hangings, presented on the same clothing racks that she saw pushed down the streets in the vicinity of her studio in New York's garment district.

While Kogelnik was in London in 1966, her New York studio space was engulfed in an enormous fire. Although Kogelnik had just moved out prior to the fire, her downstairs neighbor, American artist Alfred Leslie, lost his entire artistic output. That same year, Kogelnik married radiation oncologist Dr. George Schwarz in London, giving birth to her son Mono in 1967, returning to New York shortly thereafter. In 1969, Kogelnik created a Moonhappening during the lunar landing of Apollo 11 at the Galerie Nächst St. Stephan in Vienna, producing a series of lunar-themed silkscreens during the live broadcast.

== 1970s and later ==
In the 1970s Kogelnik's focus shifted to what later became known as her Women works, specifically addressing the female role portrayed in commercial advertising. Broaching feminist issues indirectly with irony, humor and a cool pop aesthetic was unique to Kogelnik's work during this time. In 1974 she also began to work occasionally with ceramics, employing sculptural form as an extension of painting. In the 1980s, Kogelnik establishing dedicated spaces in her studios in New York and Bleiburg for ceramics. In 1982, Christian Michelides presented her ceramics at Villa Vojcsik in the XIVth district of Vienna.

In the 1980s, fragmented people, signs and symbols begin to fill Kogelnik's work and in her Expansions series she used ceramic modules shown in conjunction with her paintings. She also produced and directed a short 16mm B&W film CBGB in 1978, featuring Jim Carroll and others.

In later works, the human body is depicted in increasingly fragmented and manipulated form, until in the 1990s much of her work portrayed highly abstracted yet expressive faces. During this time Kogelnik created a series of glass sculptures, related drawings and prints, in which she sought to comment on decorative and commercial themes in art-making.

== Death and legacy ==
Kiki Kogelnik died of cancer on February 1, 1997, in Vienna. She is buried in Bleiburg, Austria.

The Belvedere Museum in Vienna held a large retrospective of her work in the same year. In 1998 Kogelnik was posthumously awarded Austria's highest medal in the arts, the Austrian Cross of Honour for Science and Art. She was previously awarded, in 1995, the City of Vienna Prize for Visual Arts.

Since the artist's death, the Kiki Kogelnik Foundation, a U.S. non-profit organization was established, with offices in Vienna and New York City. The foundation's mission is to protect, document, research and perpetuate the creative legacy of Kiki Kogelnik. As of 2009 the foundation continues to maintain and enlarge a comprehensive database that was established in NYC of Kogelnik's works for art-historical research, and will eventually create a Catalogue Raisonné.

In 2003, the Austrian Post office issued a 55 euro-cent stamp featuring Kogelnik's 1973 painting, Prenez Le Temps d’Aimer. Kogelnik also designed two fountains, one in Bleiburg, and another in Klagenfurt, Austria, where a street is named after her.

In 2015, Kogelnik was included in The World Goes Pop, an exhibit held at the Tate Modern. The exhibit revealed an alternate view of Pop Art, showing that it was not just an American movement, but instead was international in scope. Internationally, Pop Art was also often used as a subversive language of protest rather than simply a celebration of western consumerism. The show ran from 17 September 2015 – 24 January 2016.

== See also ==
- List of Austrian artists and architects

== Literature ==
- Christa Zetter (ed.): KIKI KOGELNIK – 1234567, Galerie bei der Albertina 1991, ISBN 3-85415-090-3
- Kiki Kogelnik: Expansions, Ernst Múzeum, Budapest 1993
- Florian Waldvogel (ed.): Kiki Kogelnik: I have seen the future!, Kunstverein Hamburg 2012, ISBN 978-3864420245
- Dana Miller (ed.): Kiki Kogelnik Paperback, Mitchell-Innes & Nash 2020, ISBN 978-0998631288
- Kiki Kogelnik: Monographie, Ritter, ISBN 978-3854150756
