= Franz von Bayros =

Austrian artist, illustrator, and painter (1866–1924)

- Born: 28 May 1866; Zagreb, Croatia, Austrian Empire
- Died: 3 April 1924 (aged 57); Vienna, Austria
- Education: Vienna Academy
- Known for: Painting, illustrating, commercial artistry
- Movement: Decadent movement

Franz von Bayros (28 May 1866 – 3 April 1924) was an Austrian commercial artist, illustrator, and painter, best known for his controversial Tales at the Dressing Table portfolio. He belonged to the Decadent movement in art, often utilizing erotic themes and phantasmagoric imagery.

== Early years ==
Bayros was born in Zagreb, which was part of the Austro-Hungarian Empire and is, today, Croatia. At the age of seventeen, he passed the entrance examination for the Vienna Academy with Eduard von Engerth. Bayros mixed in high society and was part of the circle of friends of Johann Strauss II, whose stepdaughter Alice he married in 1896. The next year, Bayros moved to Munich.

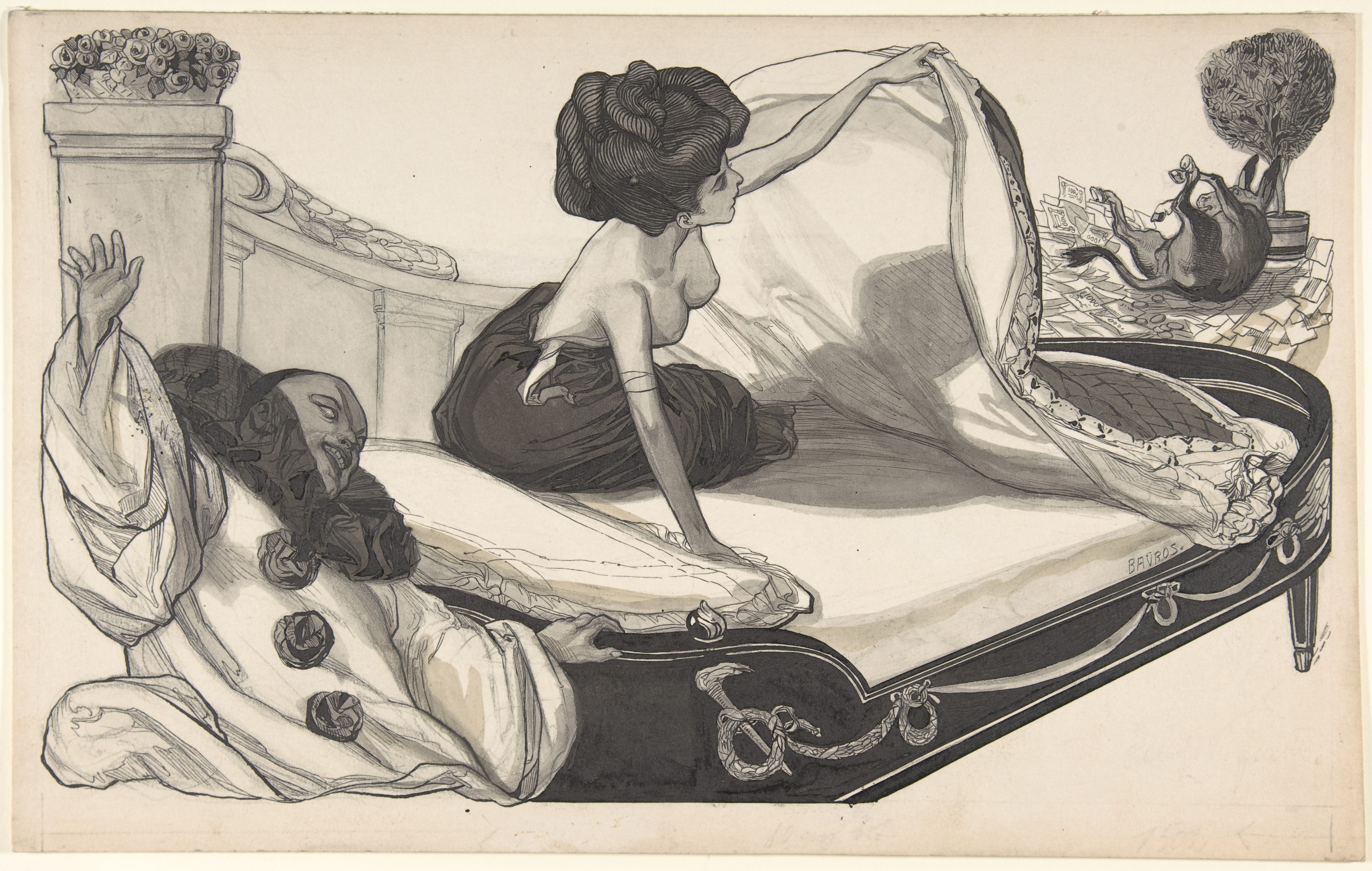
Woman in Bed Observing a Donkey (Metropolitan Museum of Art)

== Career and death ==
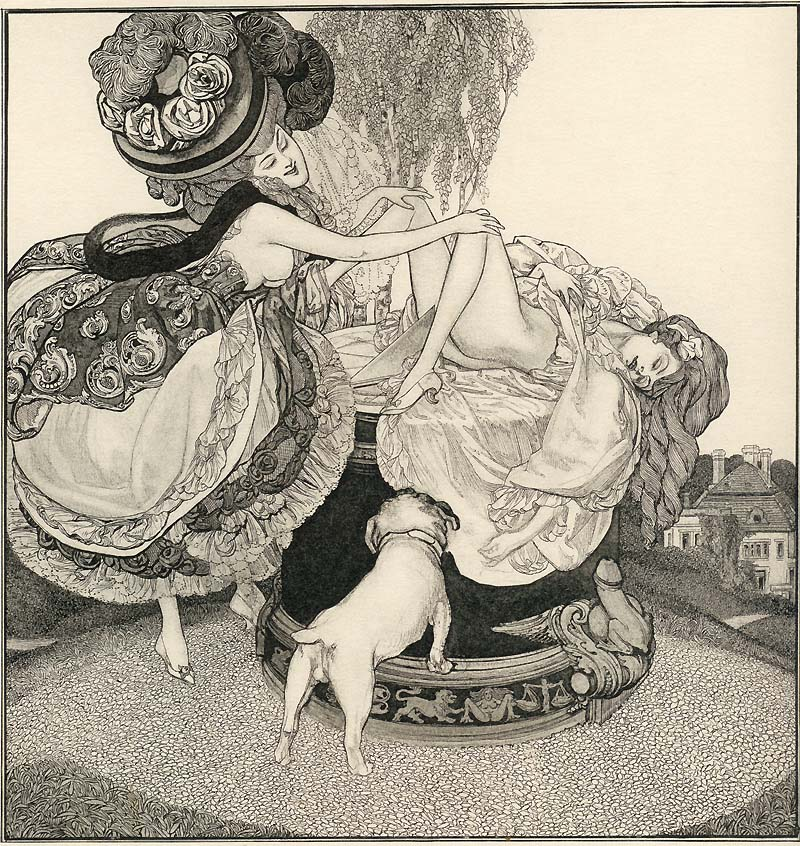
An example of the erotic art of Franz von Bayros

In 1904, he gave his first exhibition in Munich, which was well received. From 1904 until 1908, he traveled to Paris and Italy to further his studies. In 1911, he created his most famous and controversial work, Tales from the Dressing Table for which he was later arrested and exiled from Germany. Returning to Vienna, he felt like an outsider and the outbreak of the First World War increased his sense of alienation. His work can be found at the Metropolitan Museum of Art in New York. He drew over 2000 illustrations in total.

The artist died in Vienna in 1924, from a cerebral hemorrhage.

== Gallery ==
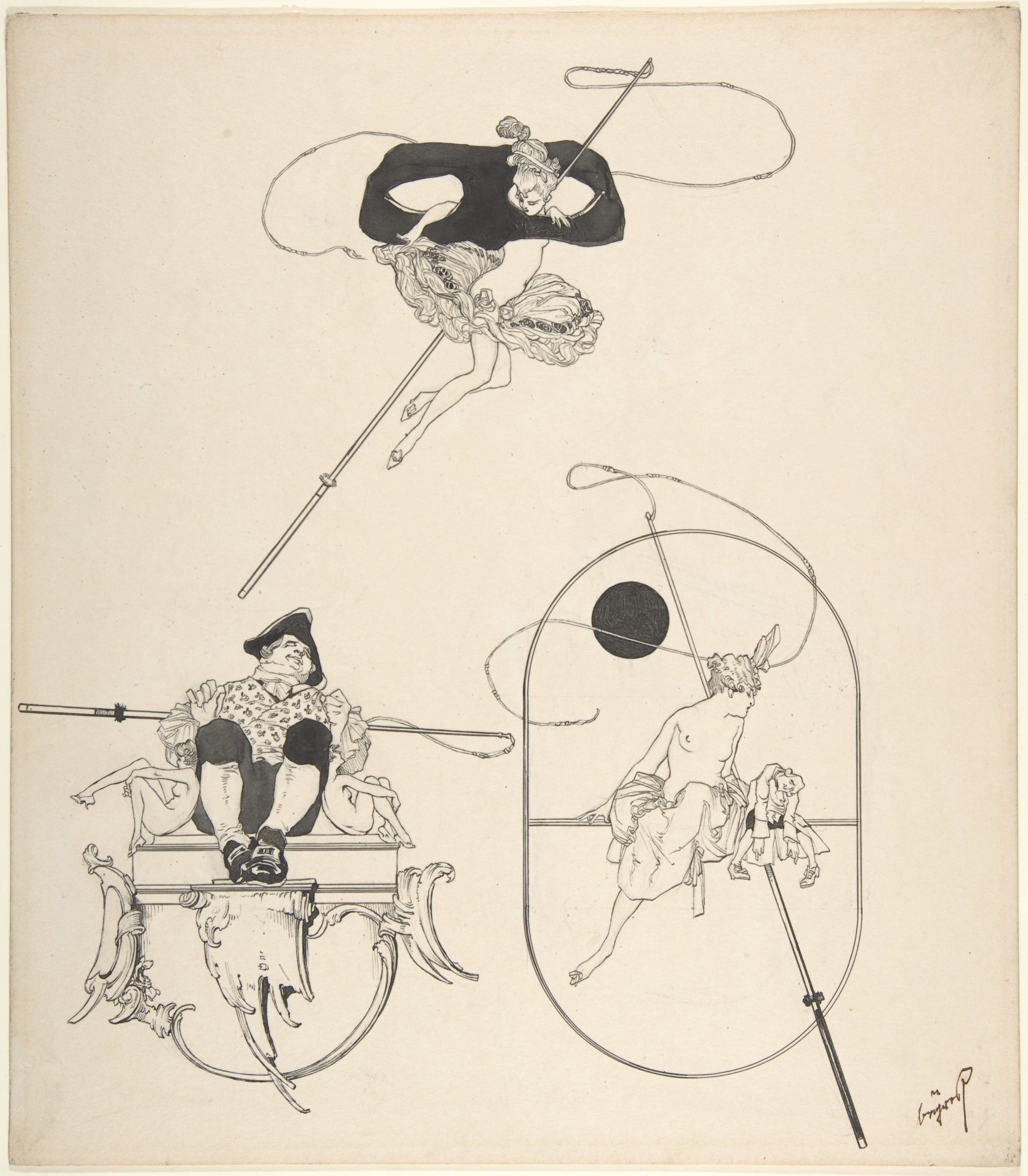
(Metropolitan Museum of Art)

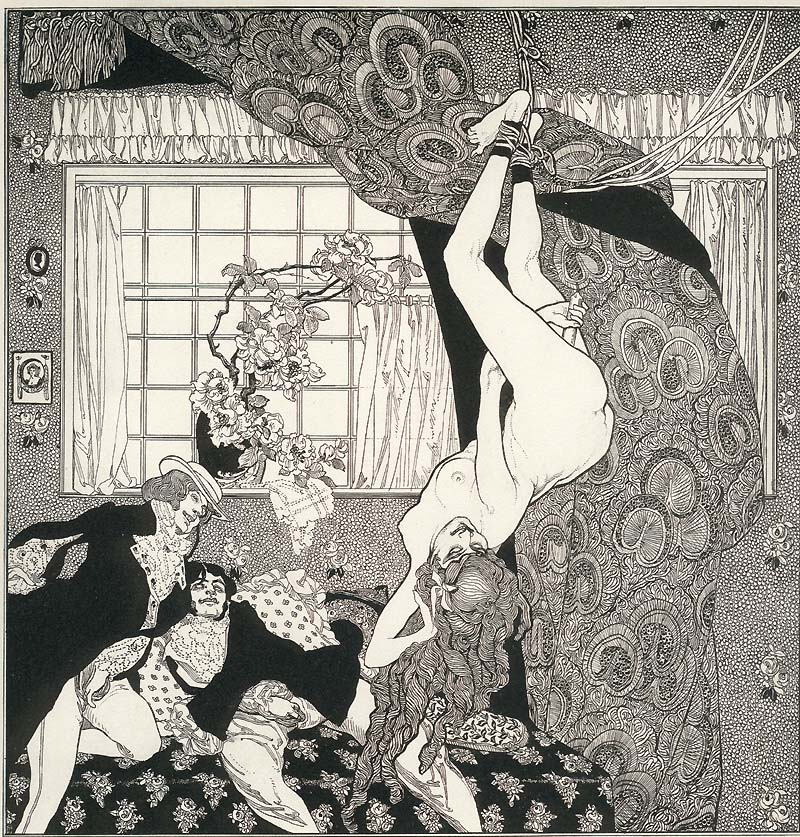

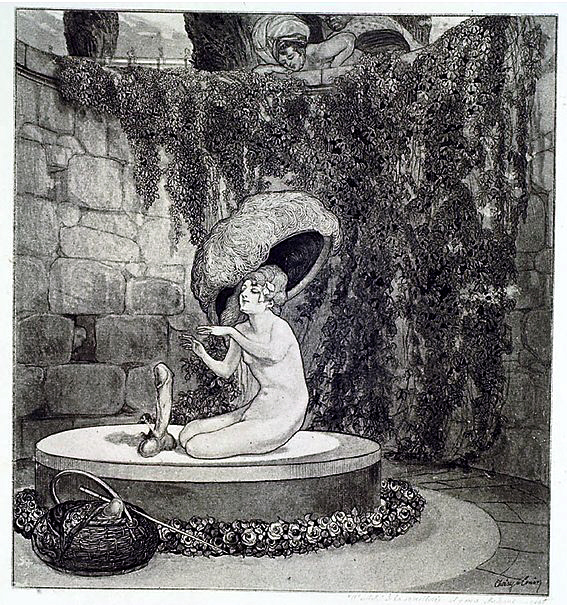

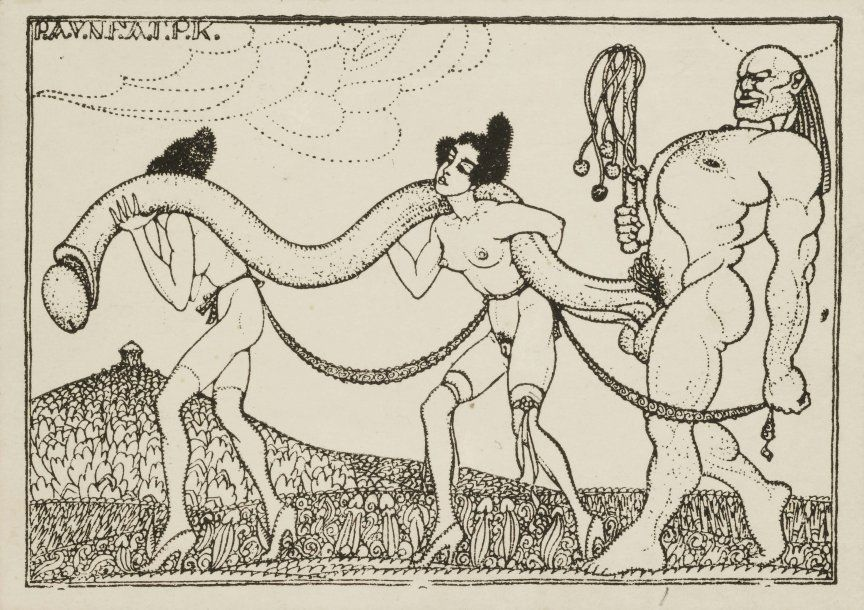

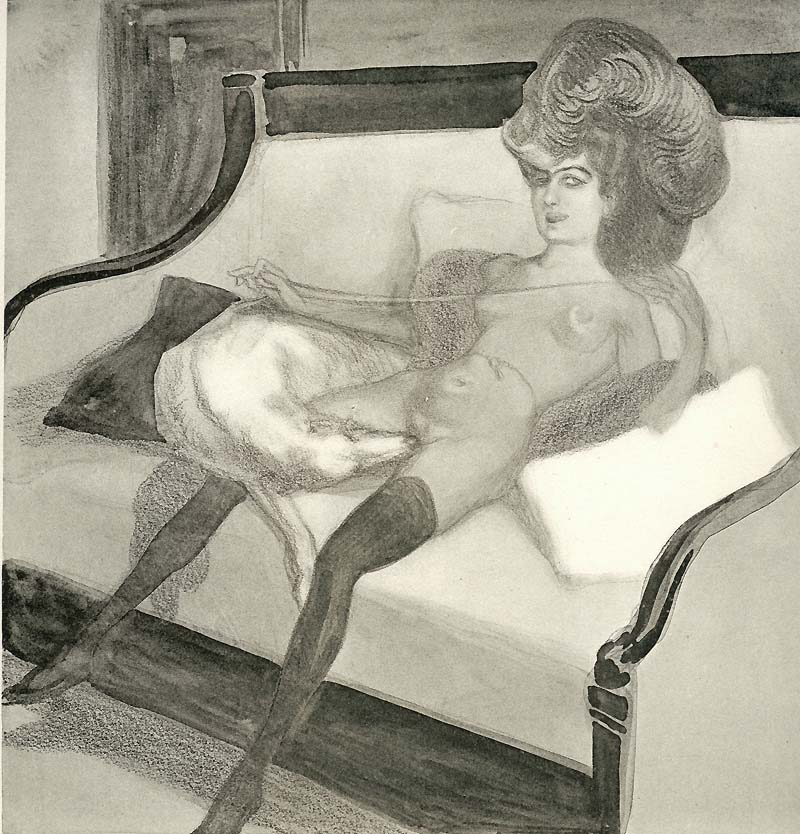

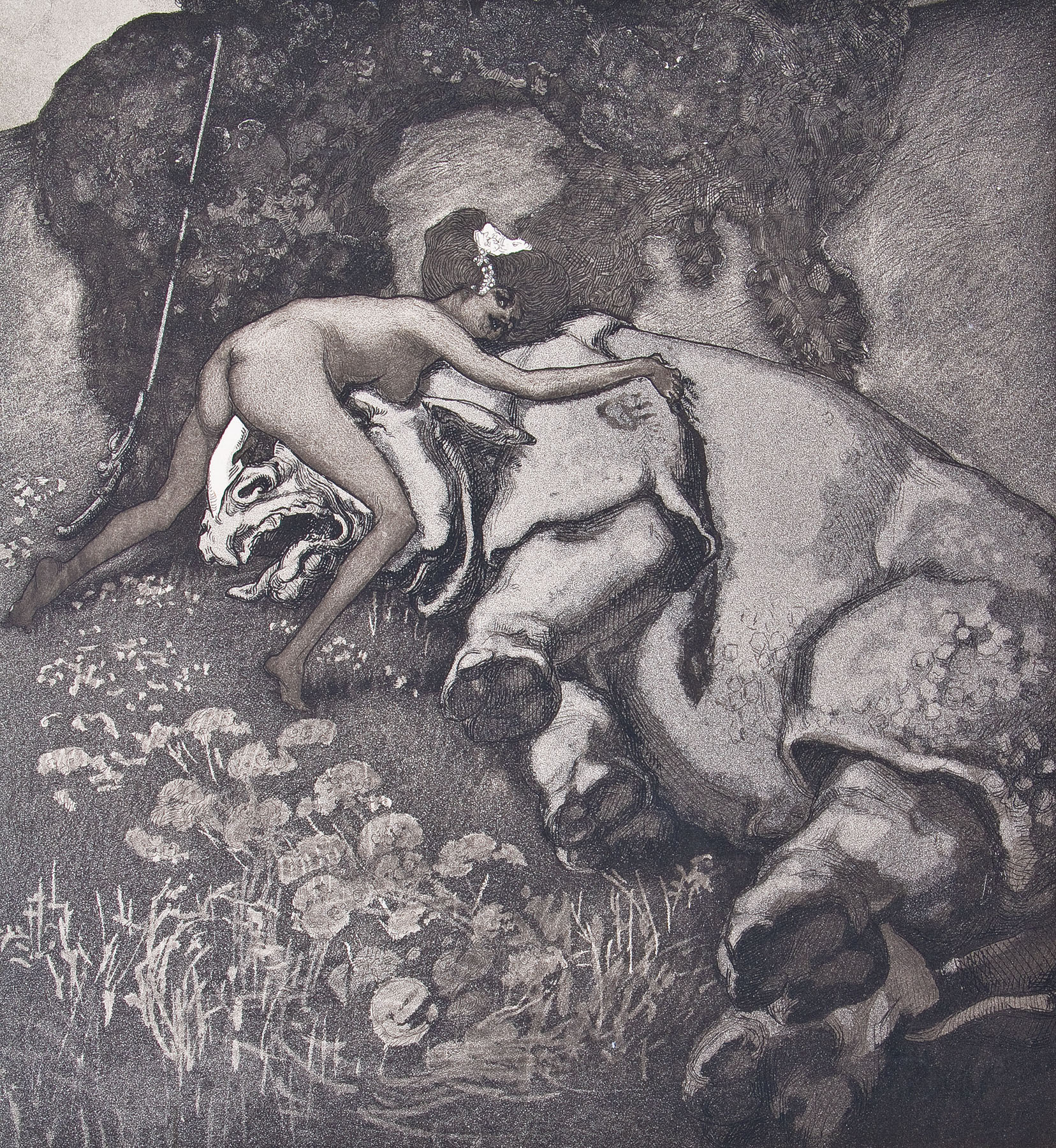

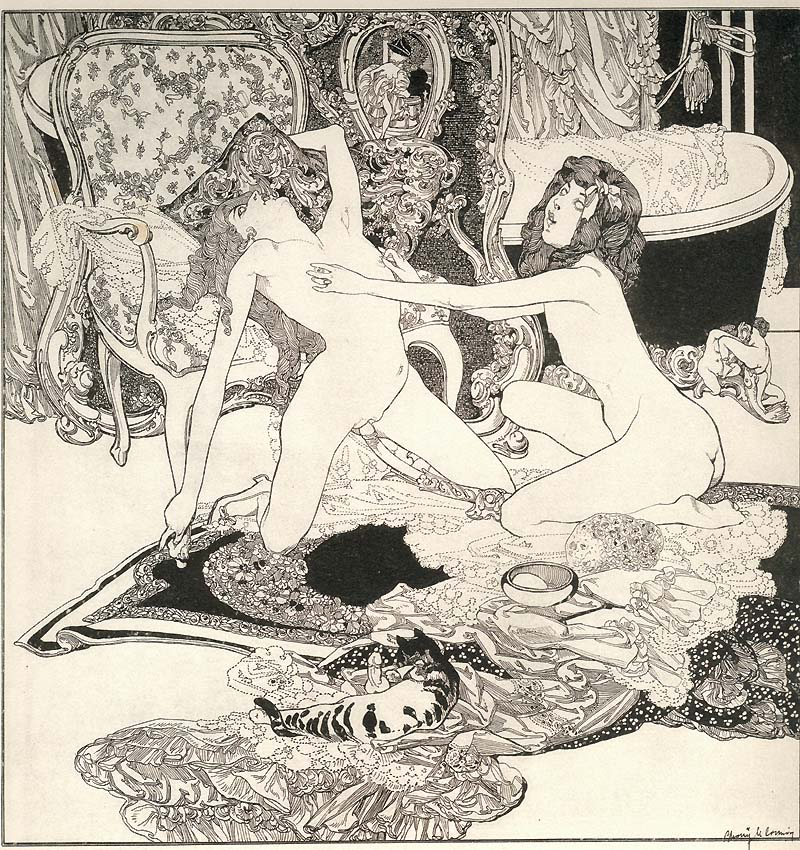

== See also ==
- List of Austrian artists and architects
