= Jasmin Hagendorfer =

Vienna-based contemporary artist, curator, and festival organizer

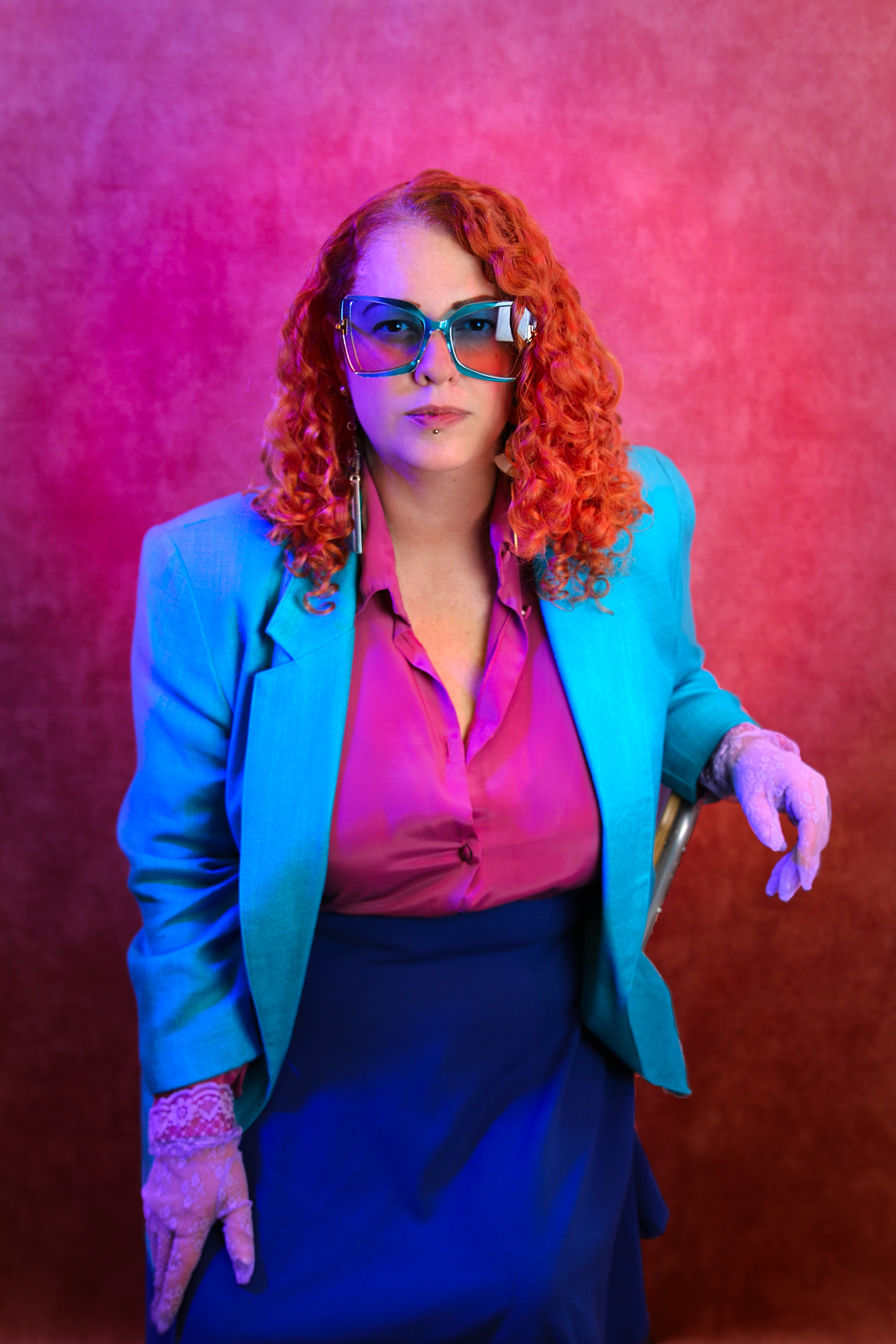
- Hagendorfer in 2025
- Education: Academy of Fine Arts Vienna
- Notable work: Art Unanchored, PFFV
- Style: Installation, sculpture, performance, video/film
- Movement: Feminist art, contextual painting

Jasmin Hagendorfer is a Vienna-based contemporary artist, writer, filmmaker, curator, producer and festival organizer. She is one of the founders and creative director of the Porn Film Festival Vienna. From 2019 to 2022 she was the creative director of Transition International Queer & Minorities Film Festival. Her main artistic interest is in installation, sculpture and performance, and her work has been exhibited in Austria, Germany, Turkey, Serbia and Greece. As an artist she is concerned with social and political discourses and questions about gender identity with an emphasis on post-porn political works. Her studio is based in Stockerau near Vienna.

As an art curator she creates events such as "Art Unanchored", an art festival that took place on a ship traveling between Vienna and Bratislava, and several queer art shows. She is often part of art and film award juries.

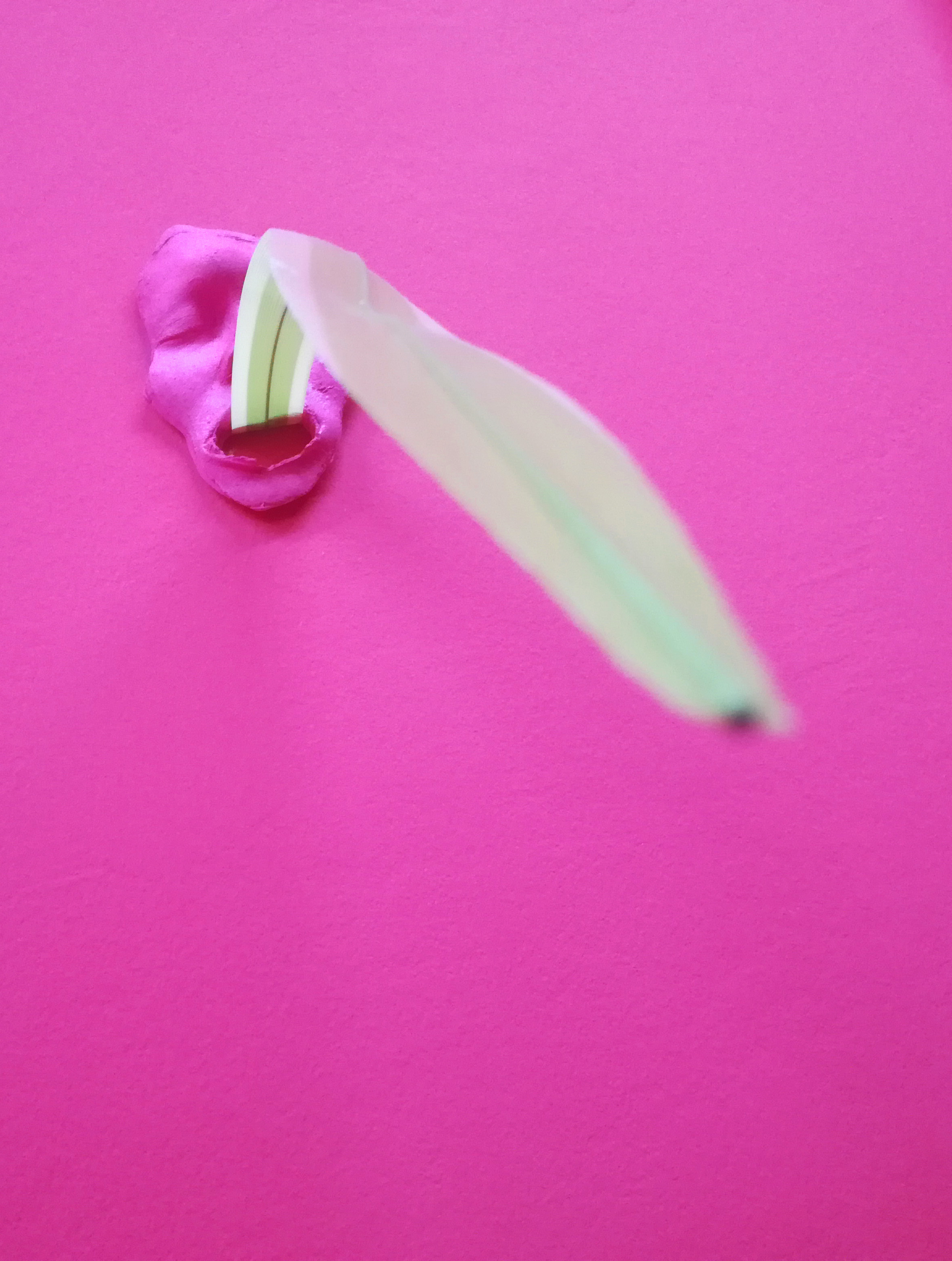
Blendwerk (2018), an installation piece by Hagendorfer/Ablinger

Her work as a founder and organizer of the Porn Film Festival Vienna focuses on conceptualizing the festival, creating artistic highlights and working on programming and outreach. Hagendorfer and her team, according to the Austrian mainstream press, are trying to bridge the gap between feminist and queer theory, art, and pornography.

She writes essays and articles, but also lectures on politics and technology, for example at Hackers on Planet Earth 2020 or TEDxVienna, and collaborates with activists like Menelas Siafakas.

Since 2019 she has been active as a film producer (e.g. the 2021 horror feature Masking Threshold by Johannes Grenzfurthner) and filmmaker. Her first film is the queer sci-fi comedy short Fudliaks! (2021), followed by the short documentary Musings Of A Mechatronic Mistress: The Peculiar Purpose Of Tiffany The Sex Robot (2023).

== Filmography ==
- Leben und Überleben (documentary feature, 2025) - as producer
- Solvent (feature, 2024) - as producer and assistant director
- Hacking at Leaves (documentary feature, 2024) - as producer and assistant director
- SLUGFEST (short film, 2024) - as director, writer, producer
- Musings of a Mechatronic Mistress – The Peculiar Purpose of Tiffany the Sex Robot (short film, 2023) - as director, writer
- Razzennest (feature, 2022) - as producer and assistant director
- Masking Threshold (feature, 2021) - as producer
- Fudliaks! (short film, 2021) - as director, writer, producer

== Publications ==
- Sexponential! (Arse Elektronika Anthology #5); edited by Johannes Grenzfurthner, Günther Friesinger, Jasmin Hagendorfer; published by edition monochrom

== Awards ==
- 2023: Best Documentary at Celludroid Film Festival (Capetown, South Africa) for Musings Of A Mechatronic Mistress: The Peculiar Purpose Of Tiffany The Sex Robot
- 2023: Scholarship of the Academy Studio Program of the Academy of Fine Arts Vienna
- 2024: Best Short Documentary at CineKink Festival (New York, USA) for Musings Of A Mechatronic Mistress: The Peculiar Purpose Of Tiffany The Sex Robot
- 2024: Best Documentary at Austrian Indiefilm Festival (Vienna, Austria) for Musings Of A Mechatronic Mistress: The Peculiar Purpose Of Tiffany The Sex Robot
