= Johann Hattey =

Austrian architect

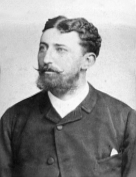
- Born: 1859
- Died: 9 September 1904 (aged 44–45)
- Occupation: Architect
- Spouse: Josefa Stranner
- Children: Johann, Josef, Bruno, Friederike, Mathilde
- Parent(s): Josef Hatag, Anna Maria Borik

Johann Evangelist Hattey (1859–1904) was an Austrian architect born in Vienna. His father, born in Klášter, Pilsnerkreis, Bohemia, was called Josef (1818–1879) and owned some land and building plots in the city. His mother's name was Anna Maria Borik, born in Žinkovy in 1815 and buried at the Vienna Central Cemetery on 16 January 1894. Most of the buildings Hattey built were, and still are, in the 18th area of the Austrian capital called 18.Wiener Gemeindebezirk or achtzehnter Bezirk. According to University site, this is the list of buildings built in Vienna under his direction:

- 1892 Miethaus, Wien 18, Währinger Straße 114
- 1896 Villa, Wien 18, Cottagegasse 31 / Anastasius-Grün-Gasse 45
- 1897 Miethaus, Wien 18, Herbeckstraße 38
- 1898 „Johannes-Hof“, Wien 18, Gersthofer Straße 65 / Ferrogasse 2 / Salierigasse 42 (Entw.+Ausf.; 1904 Erweiterung durch Arnold Heymann)
- 1900 Wohnhaus, Wien 18, Witthauergasse 38 (BH+Entw.+Ausf.)
- 1901 Miethaus, Wien 18, Plenergasse 5
- 1902 Miethaus, Wien 18, Wallrißstraße 6 und 8
- 1902–1903 Wohnhaus, Wien 6, Linke Wienzeile 174 / Morizgasse 1
- 1903 Miethaus, Wien 18, Thimiggasse 30A
- 1903–1904 Miethaus, Wien 18, Hofstattgasse 14 (Entw.+Ausf.)
- 1904 Miethaus „Augusten-Hof”, Wien 18, Hofstattgasse 15 (Entw. Franz Rohleder; Ausf.)

Research was done in 2008 by asking Baupolizei; MA 43 (Anfrage Gräberdatenbank; Grabprotokoll Zentralfriedhof, Wien 11); WStLA (Verlassenschaftsabhandlung)-

According to wien.gv.at, he also did Gentzgasse 44, Hasenauerstrasse 57, Vinzenzgasse 30, Währinger Straße 147, Hadikgasse 104, Ayrenhoffgasse 8, Bindergasse 6, Kirchengasse 42, Morizgasse 1 (https://www.wien.gv.at/kulturportal/public/searching/search.aspx?__jumpie#magwienscroll)

He also carried out some unspecified works in Hegelgasse 6, not far from the Opera; in Schwarzspanierstrasse 20, right behind the Votivkirche and hotel Regina; in Karolinengasse 23, near Prinz Eugen-Strasse and the Belvedere; and in Börsegasse 2/4, where the Vienna Stock Exchange (Wiener Börse) is.

He was a contemporary of Austrian architect Joseph Maria Olbrich (1867–1908), co-founder of the Vienna Secession artistic group which was founded in 1897 by Gustav Klimt (1862–1918), Josef Hoffmann, and Koloman Moser. It is quite likely that Hattey and Klimt met, as Hattey and Olbrich were both architects in the same city and in the same period of time, but there is no evidence of any such meeting. He and his family lived in Gersthoferstrasse 70, Vienna.

He is mentioned in the 1925 book "Währing- Ein Heimatbuch des 18. Wiener Gemeindebezirkes". The photo in this page was taken by Ludwig Grillich (1855 – 21 May 1926). Some notables who appeared before his lens were Johann Strauss II, Johannes Brahms and Sigmund Freud.

In December 2014 the Museum of the 18th District in Vienna (XVIII., Bezirksmuseum Währing, Währinger Straße 124) put on display, thanks to its director Doris Weis, a little section that acknowledges the work of Johann Hattey.

In June 2024 the 18th District Museum of Vienna dedicated its quarterly magazine entirely to him.

Hattey was of Czech origin. According to church books kept at the National Archives in Plzen, his father Josef, born in Klaster, Bohemia, Austrian Empire on 10 January 1818 as Josef Hatag, was the son of the locals Josef Hatag (same name) and Marie Svikova, who were born in the 18° century. Josef Hatag senior was the son of Simon Hatag (born in 1760) and Magdalena Czyberova (or Zieglerova), whilst Marie Svikova was the daughter of Vojtech Svik and Anna Kuplova. Anna Borik, Josef Hatag's wife, was born in Zinkovy (Czech Republic) on 29 June 1815 and was the daughter of locals Frantisek Borik and Katerina Duchkova. Parents of Frantisek Borik were Vojtech Borik and Marie Horova, while parents of Katerina were Vojtech Duchek (1743 - 1802, his father was Jan Duchek born in 1711 in Radkovice) and Anna Hlavova.

Five sons and daughters were born from his marriage to Josefine Fuhrmann (Josefa Stranner): (Johann, Josef, Bruno, Friederike, Mathilde). Bruno (buried in the Vienna Central Cemetery on 25 October 1968) married twice-from his first marriage Doris was born -children Ian and Christine Howard- and from his second he had Elfi; Johann also called Hans had two daughters; Frieda had two sons (Remo -children Frieda and Marina Pecoraro- and Irmo) and four daughters (Vera -children Laura and Franco Bacoccoli-, Elsa, Diana, Wanda -child Maririca Oliva-); Josef also called Pepsch had no sons or daughters and died in Buenos Aires; Mathilde died young during World War 1.

Josefa Stranner, Johann's wife, was born in 1870 in Vienna. Josefa was the daughter of an Austrian architect. His father, Josef (5 March 1825 – 20 May 1884), who was born in Lieseregg in Kärnten (his parents were Michael Stranner and Elisabeth ver. Stranner geb. Tandl), was in fact "Baumeister und Architekt".

This is the list of the buildings Josef Stranner built in Vienna according to a research by Architekturzentrum Wien:

Residential/commercial buildings:

- 1862 Miethaus, Wien 4, Große Neugasse 36 (torn down)
- 1863 Miethaus, Wien 4, Mühlgasse 19 (new paneling)
- 1869 Palais Thurn-Valsassina, Wien 4, Rainergasse 22 (building on a side tract)
- 1871 Miethaus, Wien 4, Starhemberggasse 5 (remodeled)
- 1874 Miethaus, Wien 4, Leibenfrostgasse 1 / Lambrechtgasse 7
- 1878 Miethaus, Wien 5, Schönbrunner Straße 41

Public buildings:

- 1883 Amtshaus Untermeidling, Wien 12, Schönbrunner Straße 259 (Entw. Eugen Sehnal)

According to WienerWohnen, he also did Siebenbrunnengasse 29., which was built in 1873.

Hattey died on 14 September 1904 and is buried at the Zentralfriedhof in Vienna, where he is registered as "Hatag Von Hataj Johann".
