= Radkovice u Hrotovic =

- Municipality
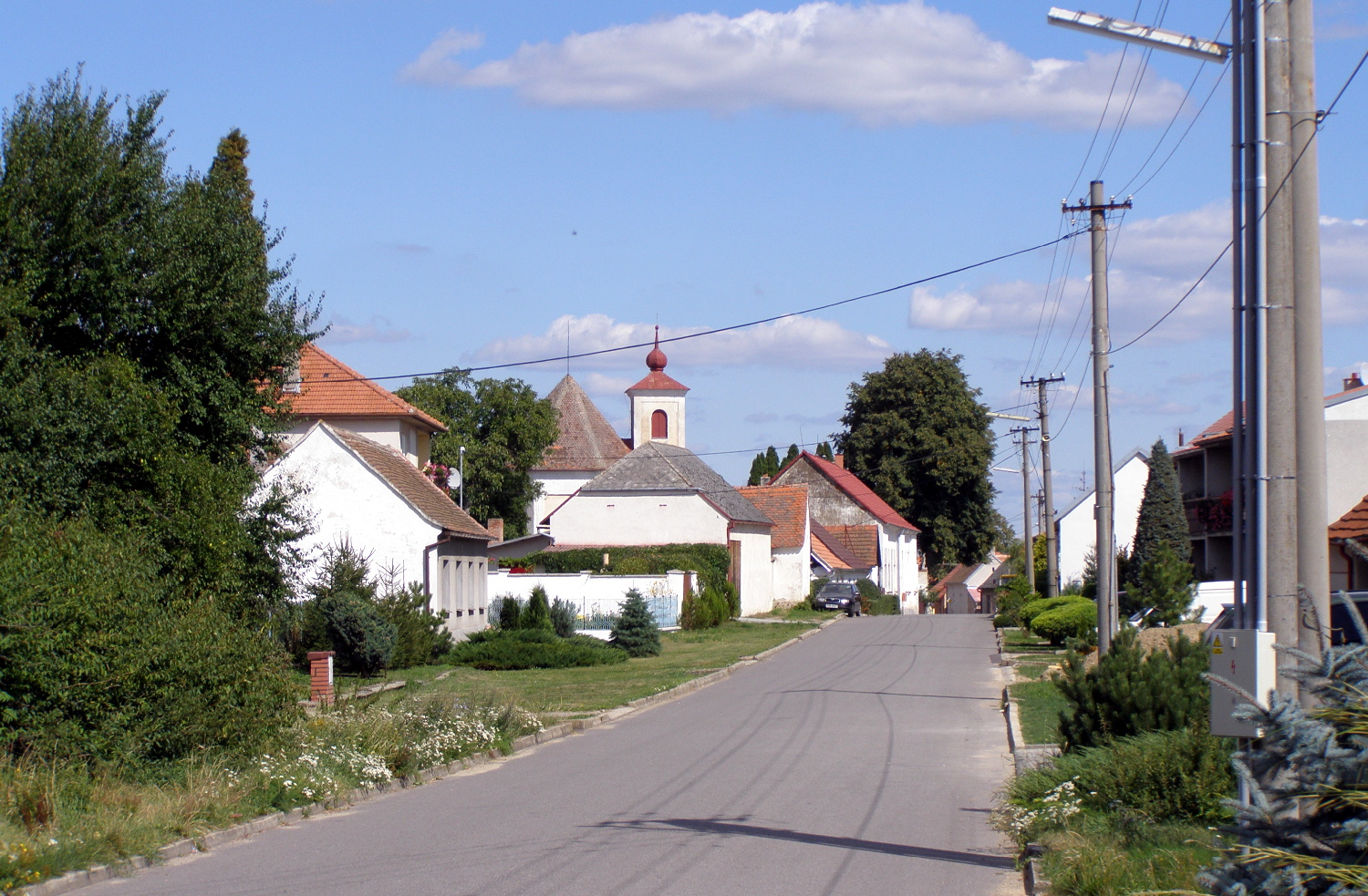
- View towards the Church of the Fourteen Holy Helpers

- Flag Coat of arms

- Location in the Czech Republic
- Coordinates: 49°4′14″N 16°0′26″E
- Country: Czech Republic
- Region: Vysočina
- District: Třebíč
- First mentioned: 1252

Area
  - Total: 15.30 km^{2} (5.91 sq mi)
- Elevation: 448 m (1,470 ft)

Population (2026-01-01)
  - Total: 329
  - Density: 21.5/km^{2} (55.7/sq mi)
- Time zone: UTC+1 (CET)
  - Summer (DST): UTC+2 (CEST)
- Postal code: 675 59
- Website: hrotovicko.cz/radkovice/

Radkovice u Hrotovic is a municipality and village in Třebíč District in the Vysočina Region of the Czech Republic. It has about 300 inhabitants.

Radkovice u Hrotovic lies approximately 19 kilometres (12 mi) south-east of Třebíč, 47 km (29 mi) south-east of Jihlava, and 160 km (99 mi) south-east of Prague.

== Demographics ==
Historical population
Year	Pop.	±%
1869	378	—
1880	372	−1.6%
1890	448	+20.4%
1900	457	+2.0%
1910	450	−1.5%
1921	481	+6.9%
1930	483	+0.4%
1950	373	−22.8%
1961	405	+8.6%
1970	347	−14.3%
1980	357	+2.9%
1991	341	−4.5%
2001	345	+1.2%
2011	315	−8.7%
2021	305	−3.2%
Source: Censuses
