= Elise Ransonnet-Villez =

Austrian painter

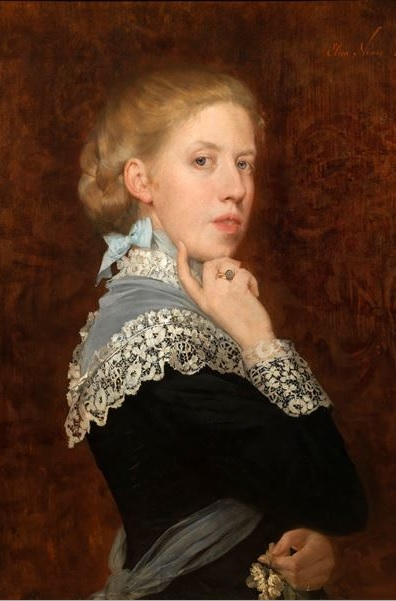
- Self-portrait, Uffizi
- Born: 8 October 1843; Vienna
- Died: 25 October 1899 (aged 56); Brixen

Elise Ransonnet-Villez or Elisa Nemes-Ransonnet (1843–1899) was an Austrian painter.

Ransonnet-Villez was born in Vienna and became a pupil of Franz von Lenbach and Heinrich von Angeli. She exhibited in Vienna and Munich. She became a baroness when she married the Hungarian count Nemes Nándor. In 1879 she painted the portrait of Franz Liszt. Ransonnet-Villez died in Brixen.

== Gallery ==
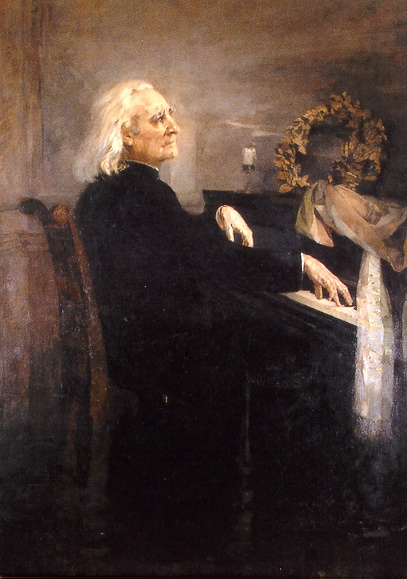
Franz Liszt, 1879

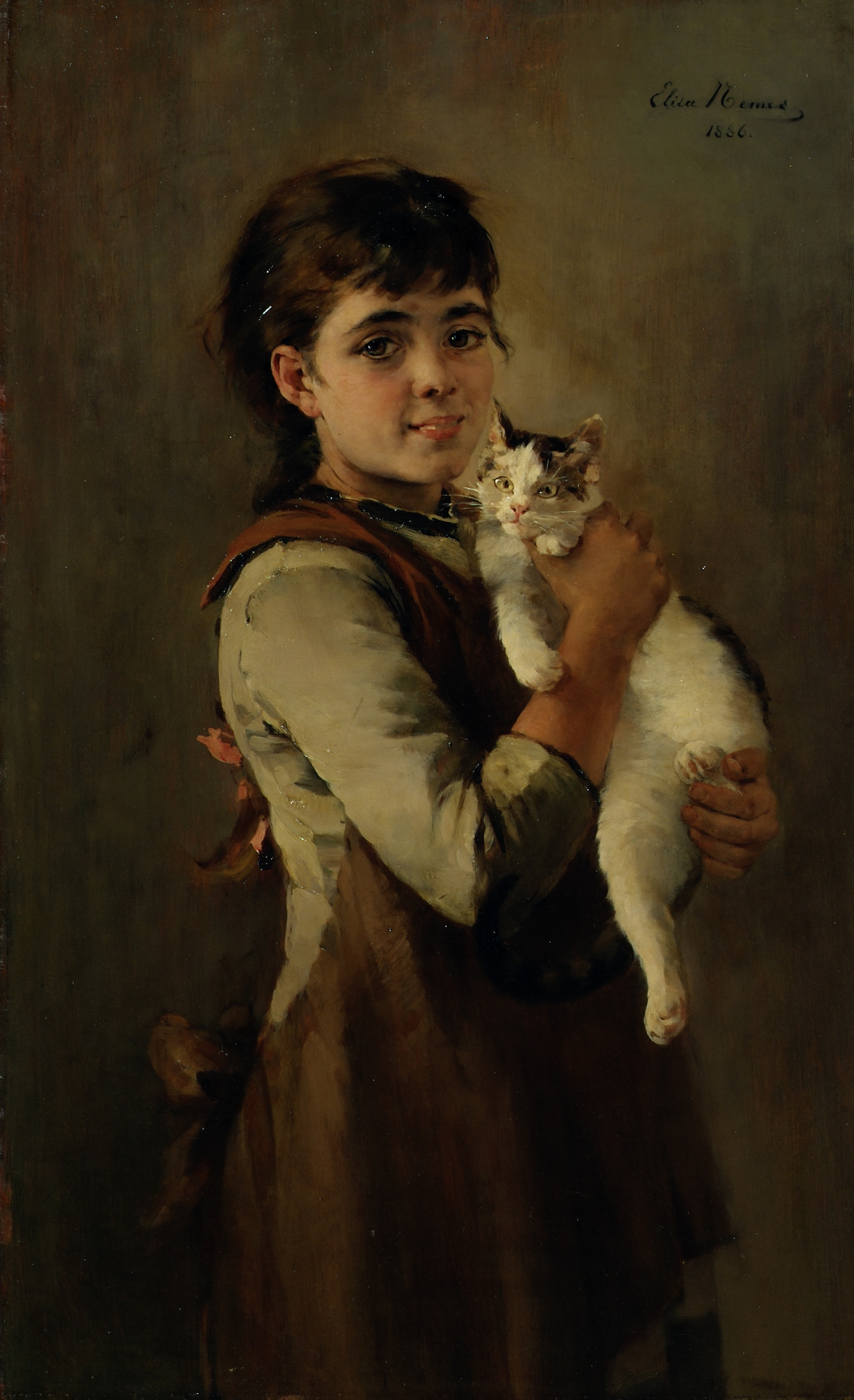
Two Kittens, 1886
