= Marie Elisabeth Wrede =

Austrian painter

Marie Elisabeth Wrede (born 1898 in Salzburghofen, died 1981 in Boulogne) was an Austrian painter, best known for her portraits.

Wrede studied with Fernand Léger in Paris. She associated with Paul Valéry, Robert and Sonia Delaunay and also Pablo Picasso, whom she drew.

She was married to Paul Arnold Hallgarten (born 7 December 1902 in Frankfurt am Main, died 1930 in Salzburg), the son of Fritz Hallgarten and Yella Bonn, a cousin of Moritz Julius Bonn, who in turn was a cousin of the art historian Aby Warburg.

== Works in museums and collections ==
- The Musée national d'art modern in Paris (Centre Pompidou) houses several of her works.
- Wrede used drypoint etching to capture a portrait of her friend Paul Valéry, now in the collection of the Museum Europäische Kunst in Nörvenich.
- She painted a portrait of Reinhard Demoll, the rector of the Ludwig-Maximilians-Universität München from 1959 to 1960. She was connected to the university through her husband's uncle, the lawyer and Germanist Robert Hallgarten (1870-1924).

== Sources ==
- Memmel, Matthias; Wimböck, Gabriele (29 November 2011). "Die Herren der Kette: Rektorenporträts an der LMU (The Lords of the Chain: Rector portraits at the LMU)" (PDF). Unigalerie (in German). Munich, Germany: Ludwig-Maximilians-Universität München.
- Schembs, Hans-Otto; Unfaller, Arno. Charles Hallgarten: Leben und Wirken eines Frankfurter Sozialreformers und Philanthrophen (Charles Hallgarten. Life and Work of a Frankfurt Social Reformer and Philanthropist). Societäts-Verlag, Frankfurt 2003. ISBN 3-7973-0850-7.
