= Roberta Lima =

Austrian artist (born 1974)

- Born: December 2, 1974 (age 51); Manaus, Brazil
- Education: Universidade do Vale do Rio dos Sinos
- Alma mater: Academy of Fine Arts Vienna
- Known for: Video art Performance art
- Website: https://robertalima.com/

Roberta Lima was born in 1974 in Manaus, the capital of Amazonas, Brazil.

After graduating with a degree in architecture in 2001, Lima moved to Austria. In 2007 Lima earned a Master's degree in Fine Arts and in 2013 a PhD in Philosophy.

Thereafter Lima worked as lecturer and University Assistant for the Contextual Painting Class at the Academy of Fine Arts Vienna.

Roberta Lima uses different media such as photographs, videos, sculptures, and paintings to create installations. Lima explores with alternative narratives of body and space, incorporating various elements of popular media and historical references to produce art and initiate discussions about the role of artist and viewer. Lima looks for intersections between nature and technology, mythology and gender nonconformity, to produce artworks with sustainable and alternative material sources.

Roberta Lima has participated in international events, including at the Cairo Biennale (2008), dounaufestival (2008 & 2016), Wiener Festwochen (2016), Kyoto Experiment (2018), The London Coronet (2019 & 2020) and Vienna Art Week (2022). Lima works are in The Verbund Art Collection, Austrian Federal Photography Collection, MUSA Museum Artothek and Ursula Blickle Video Archive and others. In 2007 Lima was awarded the "Akademiefreundepreis" and "H13 Prize for Performance". In 2013 Roberta Lima received the Award of Excellence for her PhD dissertation and in 2018 the Austrian Citizenship based on their merit, accomplishments, and contributions to the nation.

Roberta Lima currently lives in Helsinki, Finland.

== Exhibitions ==
- 2024 In/Visibilizations. De(s)coloniality and Art. Academy of Fine Arts Vienna, Austria
- 2023 Rewriting Love & Pain. The Coronet, London, England
- 2021 ART IS. Merano Arte, Italy
- 2020 When Gesture Becomes Event. City Art Gallery, Ljubljana, Slovenia
- 2020 Ghost Plant. Stadtraum - Sammlung Friedrichshof & Estate Otto Mühl, Vienna, Austria
- 2019 Archipelago Mountain. Exhibition Laboratory, Helsinki, Finland
- 2019 Embodiment of Water. The Coronet, London, England
- 2018 Embodiment of Water. Kyoto Art Center, Japan
- 2017 Queer Encounters – Vienna Trans L.A. California Institute of the Arts, Valencia, United States of America
- 2016 Queer Way. donaufestival, Krems, Austria
- 2015 Self-timer Stories. MUSAC / Museo de Arte Contemporáneo de Castilla y León, Spain
- 2015 Face Forward. Kunst Arzt, Kyoto, Japan
- 2014 Self-timer Stories. ACFNY / Austrian Cultural Forum New York, United States of America
- 2014 Selbstauslöser. Museum der Moderne Salzburg, Austria
- 2013 Hetero q.b. National Museum of Contemporary Art, Lisbon, Portugal
- 2012 ReBirth. Defibrillator, Chicago, United States of America
- 2012 Displacement. White Box, New York City, United States of America
- 2011 Wiener Glut. KIT, Düsseldorf, Germany
- 2009 Chuan men. Amelie Gallery 798, Beijing, China
- 2010 where do we go from here? Secession, Vienna, Austria
- 2009 from transgression to transcription. Stadtgalerie Schwaz, Tirol, Austria
- 2008 synchronicity. 11th Cairo Biennial, Egypt
- 2007 Cut it Out! Kapelica Gallery, Ljubljana, Slovenia
