= Menelas Siafakas =

Greek film director, photographer, and artist

- Born: 1974 (age 51–52)
- Occupations: Director, photographer, artist

Menelas Siafakas (born 1974) is an Athens-based Greek artist, filmmaker, photographer, and film festival director. Siafakas is an LGBT activist.

== Life and work ==
Siafakas has been a prolific activist and artist in the LGBTQI+ movement in Greece. Growing up in an almost invisible and politically ignored gay scene, he decided to leave Greece in the early 1990s and study sports science at the University of Glasgow. It gave him his first opportunity to live an open life. As a student councilor, Siafakas used his position to try to change society. He expanded the university's Pride celebrations from a one-day event to an entire week. He started workshops, debates, parties, and sporting events, including a sponsored run for an HIV charity.

Menelas returned to Greece in 2009. In 2011, he founded the annual queer arts festival Civil Disobedience. He is also a member of the team that sought an ultimately successful conviction of Greek Orthodox Bishop Amvrosios for homophobic hate speech. He is the founder and co-organizer of the Queer Theatre Awards for Athens since 2012. He is also involved in the ongoing fight for justice following the brutal murder of Zak Kostopoulos, one of Greece's most prominent LGBTQI+ activists, in September 2018.

=== Filmmaking and film curating ===
Since 2019, Siafakas has been a member of various film juries (e.g. Porn Film Festival Vienna), organizing screenings and public meetings in which he addresses themes of art forms and queer activism as well as the importance of film theater in the field of sexuality, social politics, and gender. He was also part of the exhibition "Eros" in 2019, which was shown at MOMus-Experimental Center for the Arts as part of the Thessaloniki Queer Arts Festival.

In 2019, the Greek Tourism Organization commissioned a commercial by Siafakas, but it was banned without any reason.

In 2020, Siafakas founded Satyrs and Maenads: the Athens Porn Film Festival, a festival dedicated to bringing together queer theory, art, and pornography. Siafakas also curated erotic film programs screened in various European cities (Vienna and San Francisco).

==== Filmography ====
Siafakas's short films:

- The Good Kid (2012)
- The Naked Truth (2012)
- Post-Orgasmic (2013)
- The Raspberry Reich GR (2015)
- Scattered Thoughts of a Young Sex Worker (2016)
- Symposium: an athenian rawmance (2017)
- Welcome to Athens (2018)
- The Melita Show The Movie (2019)

=== Photography ===
Siafakas is working as a photographer for various outlets like Kaltblut and Butt Magazine.

== Awards ==
- Best International Porn Short Film at the 2022 Porn Film Festival Vienna.
