= Stefan Zsaitsits =

Austrian Artist

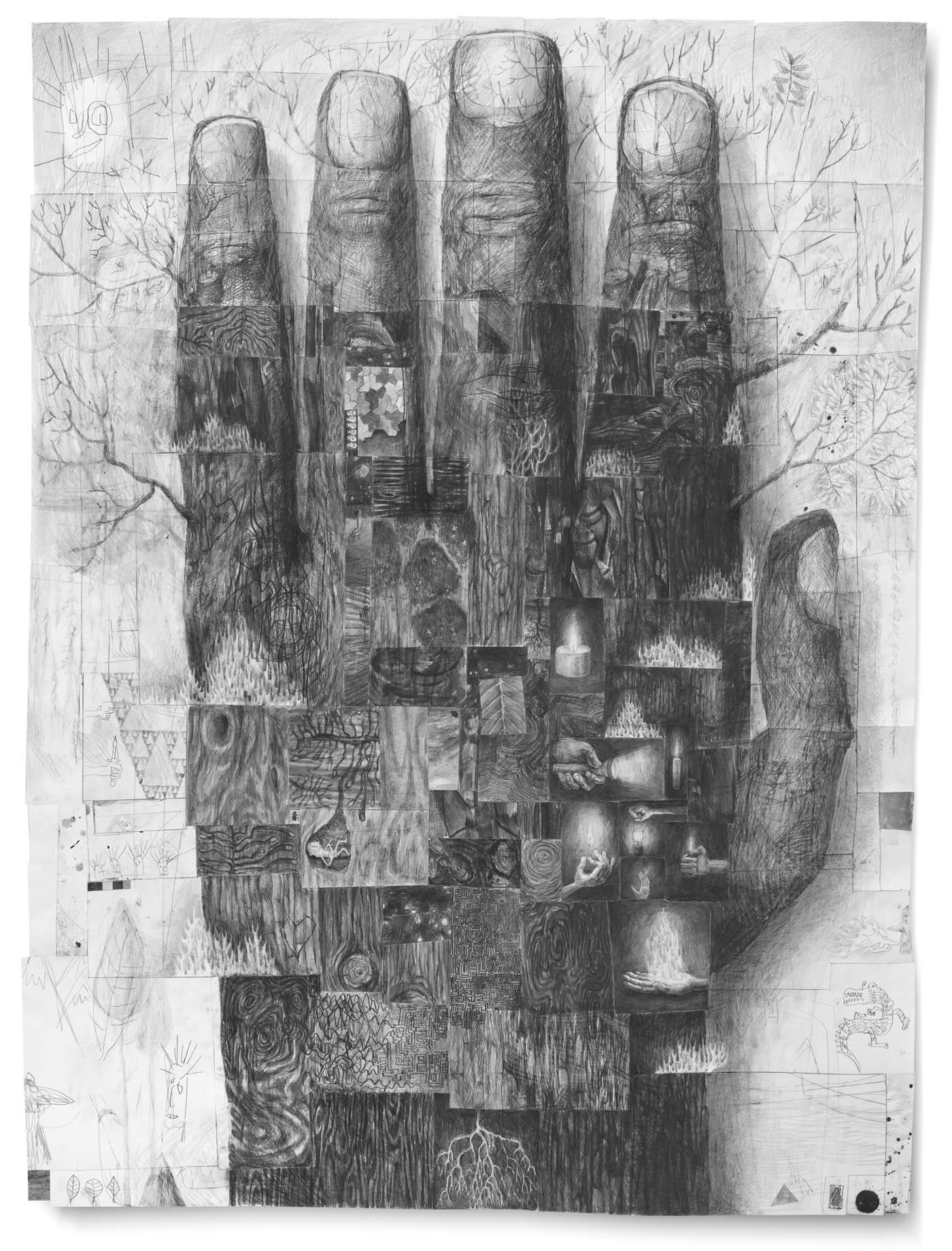
Stefan Zsaitsits, "Your Wooden Hand" 2023, graphite on paper, 107x80 cm

Stefan Zsaitsits (born 1981 in Lower Austria) is an Austrian artist.

He studied at the University of Applied Arts Vienna and has exhibited internationally. His drawings have been published in books and shown in exhibitions across Europe and worldwide.

Zsaitsits is represented in both national and international collections, including the Albertina in Vienna and the Lentos Art Museum, as well as in numerous private collections.

He lives and works in Lower Austria.

== Grants and awards ==
- 2017: Lower Austria Cultural Award
- 2017: Österreichischer Grafikwettbewerb, funded by South Tyrol
- 2014: Art Austria Award
- 2006: Sophie Fohn Foundation, Grant
- 2005: Fred Adlmüller Foundation, Grant
- 2003: University of applied Arts Vienna, Grant

== Publications ==
- Häuser, 2018, ISBN 978-3-200-06014-2
- Homunculi (with a foreword by Barbara Frischmuth), 2014, ISBN 978-3-200-03790-8
- Headsongs, 2012, ISBN 978-3-200-02305-5
- Der Hals der Sängerin : vier Erzählungen / Barbara Frischmuth & Stefan Zsaitsits, Edition Thurnhof, 2012, ISBN 978-3-900678-17-3
