= Elizabeth Burger Monath =

Austrian artist

- Born: 1907; Vienna, Austria
- Died: 1986 (aged 78–79)
- Known for: painting, children's book illustration, intaglio

Elizabeth Monath (1907-1986) was an Austrian artist known for painting, children's book illustration and intaglio.

== Biography ==
Elizabeth Burger Monath was born in Vienna, Austria. She studied at the Academy of Fine Art, Vienna and the Graphische Lehr und Versuchsantalt in Vienna. She studied with Moses Sayer in New York City and also with Amadee Ozentant and Fernand Léger in Paris. In 1936, she married Paul Monath, and they had two sons, Thomas, John and a daughter Elsie.

Monath was known for illustration, intaglio, landscape painting of animals and book writing. In 1930, she moved from her native Austria to Paris to study art in a city artistically vibrant with such talents as Picasso, Braque and Leger. Here Monath was trained by Fernand Leger. Examples of Monath's work are in the British Museum, Princeton University, the United Nations Headquarters, the New Jersey State Museum, and others. She illustrated Peter Rabbit, 'Topper and the Giants, the Other End of the String, as well as many others.
