= Paul Schuss =

French artist of the Ecole de Paris (born 1948)

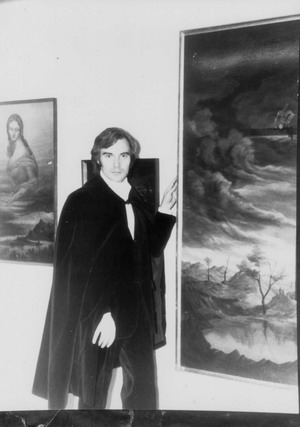
Paul Schuss

Paul Schuss (born 23 July 1948 in Munzkirchen, Austria) is a French artist of the Ecole de Paris (School of Paris). Born after World War II, he is a part of "La Jeune Peinture" de l'Ecole de Paris ("The Young Painting" of the School of Paris ).

Schuss came to France in 1949, and he has benefited from a Franco-Austrian cultural upbringing. His family dates its history back to the 12th century in the Cani della Scala family di Verona, Italy, and the Von Prack von Asch Family from Tyrol, Austria.

== Biography ==
Since his early childhood, as soon as he learned to hold a pencil and a brush, he started to draw and paint with passion.

After different homes in Burgundy, Provence and the Côte d'Azur near Saint Tropez, his family setting up in Nièvre in 1953.

At the age of 10, Schuss met the French painter Albert Drachkovitch-Thomas, who discovered his talent. He offered him his first professional paintings box and brushes and he introduced him succinctly to the tempera technique.

Schuss taught himself other pictural techniques like acrylic, watercolor, inkwashing, mixmedia and pastel.

He exhibited for the first time at the age of 17 in the Chapelle Sainte Marie (Nevers, France) with Le Salon du Groupe Nivernais. He created these paintings at the age of 14, 15 and 16. All these paintings were bought by collectors. The Prefecture de Nevers bought the painting that he showed in his next exhibition in May in Nevers.

He began to study law in Paris but eventually decided to devote himself entirely to art at the age of nineteen.

As an adolescent, he discovers his affinity towards light. He saw a warm, strange golden light – as if it was inhabited – glowing through the window of a fortified castle in ruins. This stream of light touched him deeply as he felt it was the Life of Light. Since then, this image has been part of him and has influenced his art in many ways.

As he was living in Paris, he met Erté in 1968.

In 1971 he left for Austria in search of his roots. He lived for two years in Salzburg and then for six years in Vienna.

In 1972 he showed his art in the Palais Lobkowitz in Vienna, where Ludwig van Beethoven's Third Symphony was performed for the first time in Vienna in this hall with the composer as conductor in 1804.

He met the Doctor Karl Kanzian who will become the most important collector of Paul Schuss' paintings in Europe.

In 1974 Prinz Otto zu Windisch-Graetz (born in 1928 and related to the family of Emperor Franz Josef von Habsburg-Lothringen and Elisabeth of Bavarian (Sissi) and their son Prinz Rudolf of Austria) and several relatives visited him in his studio in Vienna. Prinz Otto zu Windisch-Graetz shot photos of his important tempera paintings like "Dialog with the Eternal", "Power of Nature", "The Town without Soul", "Last Suns".

In 1979 Paul Schuss returned to France and resides since this time in Burgundy.

Since 1980, he is part of one of the most important galleries of Paris: La Galerie d'Art de la Place Beauvau. The director, Jean Minet, said about Paul Schuss: " He is one of our eminent painters, yes he is an eminent artist".

In Paris in 1987 he met Marc Squarciafichi who became his manager in Japan. With artists like Bernard Buffet, Leonor Fini, Mac Avoy, Yves Brayer and others he belongs to the School of Paris ( Ecole de Paris) that Marc Squarciafichi exhibited for more than 15 years in the biggest cities of Japan, in important galleries like Daimaru Galleries, Bijutsu Sekai Gallery, Mori Art Gallery, Nikken Gallery.

Schuss has used a great variety of techniques ranging from tempera to acrylic, watercolor, pastel, mixed techniques, drawing, tint, and lithography.

In 1987 he learned lithography at the world-famous Atelier Mourlot in Paris, where artists like Salvador Dalí, Norman Rockwell, Matisse, Arno Breker or Picasso made their lithos in the past. He makes a point of destroying officially the plates used for his lithographs and sells each lithograph with an authenticity certificate signed by Jacques Mourlot. He made 11 editions until 1990: 5 editions in color and 6 in black and white (monochrome).

Paul Schuss wanted to create black and white lithographs at that time. Jacques Mourlot told him that no artists were making monochrome lithographs anymore and that only color ones were being produced. In 1989, Paul Schuss was the first artist to create black and white lithographs again in France. This latter became as famous as his color lithographs in Japan. His works includes " The refuge Tree", "Untamed Passions", both in 1989, followed by " Waiting", " The old bridge", " The crows" and " The forgotten letter", in 1990.

Since 1987, Doctor Sozo Hino, owner of the Hino Hospital and great collector begun to collect the art of Paul Schuss to create a Schuss Museum in Osaka, in Japan. The project failed in 1991, after the French government restarted the nuclear tests in the Pacific. At this time all French items were boycotted.

Schuss has exhibited his work at an international level, in France, Austria, Germany, Japan, England, Monaco, and in the United States (Hawaii) and New York. His work is found in public and private collections around the world.

Paul Schuss currently lives in Burgundy, France. He is married to Chantal Garceau and they have two children: Tatiana and Romain.

His sister Elisabeth is married to the writer Tidiane Diakite.

His passion for discovering new landscapes and new cultures leads him to travel around the world.

== Main exhibitions ==
1966

- At the age of 17 he exhibited for the first time in the Salon du groupe Nivernais, Chapelle Sainte Marie, Nevers, France

1967

- Two exhibitions in the Salon du groupe Nivernais, Chapelle Sainte Marie, Nevers, France

1969

- One-man exhibition in the Galerie Raymond Duncan, Paris, France

1970

- Salon des Surindépendants, Paris, France

1971

- One-man exhibition in Haus der Donauschwaben, Salzburg, Austria
- One-man exhibition in Haus der Donauschwaben in Sindelfingen, Germany

1972

- One-man exhibition in his own studio in Salzburg, Austria
- One-man exhibition in the Residenz, Salzburg, Austria
- One-man exhibition in the Centre Culturel Français de Munich, Munich, Germany
- One-man exhibition in the Palais Lobkowitz, Franzözisches Kultur Institut (Centre Culturel Français), Vienna, Austria

1975

- One-man exhibition in the Galerie Marcel Bernheim, Paris, France

1981

- One-man exhibition in the Galerie Saint Vincent, Nevers, France

1984

- One-man exhibition in the Galerie d'Art de la Place Beauvau, Paris, France
- Honored guest at the Salon de l'Hôtel de Ville de Sens, Sens, France
- Galerie l'Art Ancien, Orléans, France

1985

- Salon de Montmorency, Montmorency Val d'Oise, near Paris, France
- Galerie Schèmes, Lille, France

1986

- One-man exhibition in the Galerie d'Art de la Place Beauvau, Paris, France

1987

- Hôtel de Ville of the 10th arrondissement of Paris, France
- Daimaru Galleries, Osaka, Kyoto and Tokyo, Japan

1988

- One-man exhibition in the Galerie l'Art Ancien, Orléans, France
- Kunstkabinet Baden-Baden, Germany

1989 to 1993

- Daimaru Galleries, Osaka, Tokyo and Kyoto, Kobe, Fukuoka, Japan
- Nikken Gallery, Tokyo, Japan
- Mori Art Gallery, Tokyo, Japan
- Bijutsu Sekai Gallery, Tokyo, Japan

1996

- Galerie Olivier Arens, Saint-Martin (French West Indies)

1998

- Daimaru Galleries, Tokyo, Osaka, Kyoto, Japan
- One-man exhibition, Vézelay, France

1999

- One-man exhibition in the Galerie Schèmes, Lille, France
- Galerie Dewez, Reims, France
- Abbaye Saint Georges de Bocherville ( historical monument), near Rouen, France

2000

- Galerie Artop, Lille, France

2002

- Gallery in Cork Street, London, UK, as member of the Society for the Art of Imagination
- Goldmark Gallery, London, UK, as member of the Society for the Art of Imagination

2003 and 2004

- Open studio, Sainpuits, Burgundy, France

2005

- Retrospective exhibition in the Maison de l'Amerique Latine, Monaco

2007

- Shipstore Galleries, Hawaii, USA

2012

- Salon de l'Art Fantastique Europeen ( SAFE ) Mont-Dore, Auvergne, ( France )
- Galerie Mourlot New York, (Lithograph) USA

== Bibliography ==
- France

-Annuaire de l'Art International, (1986–1987) Edition Sermadiras, France.

-Annuaire National des Beaux-Arts, (1998) Edition Thibaud, France.

-Dictionnaire des peintres, sculpteurs et graveurs nivernais du XVe au XXe siècle,(2002)Maurice Bardin, Edité par le Conseil Général de la Nièvre

-Visages de Bourgogne, (1999) Édition du Cherche Midi, France.

-L’Yonne et les peintres, (2004) Roland Conilleau, Editions de Bagatelle.

- Japan

-Peintures Contemporaines Françaises, Bijutsu Sekaï Edition (1987)

-École de Paris, Daïmaru Edition (1989)

- Switzerland

-Who's Who in International Art, (1991–1992), (1993–1994), (1998–1999)

- Monaco

-Nice Matin (Juin 2005)(journal)( newspaper)

-Monaco Riviera Magazine (Printemps 2005) (article and reproduction)

-Résidences Côte d’Azur (Juillet 2005) (article and reproduction)

-Grand Sud (Mai-Juin 2005)

== Television ==
- Germany

For the exhibition at the Centre Culturel Français de Munich ( Franzosisches Kultur Institut)(1972), Munich

- France

-FR3 (1984), Edition Régionale d'Orléans

-FR3 (1988), Edition Régionale d'Orléans

-France 3 (1998), Edition Régionale de Bourgogne

- Monaco

TMC (Télé Monte-Carlo) (2005) Video of the retrospective show in Monaco http://www.monaco.mc/actuVoirVideo.do?idMedia=63119&KeepThis=true&TB_iframe=true&height=630&width=6 Vidéos

- Japan Video

Portrait of the artist (1987) by Estel International.

== Radio ==
- France

-Radio France Auxerre (1998)

-Radio France Auxerre (2000)

- Austria

-The news, Salzburg (1971)

-The news, Salzburg (1972)

== Collections ==
- Official Collections

– Préfecture de la Nièvre, Nevers (France)(1967)

-Salzburgland, Salzburg (Austria)(1971)

-Salzburg City (Austria)(1971) "Power of Passion" painted in 1969, Tempera on panel.

-Monaco: SAS Prince Albert II of Monaco (2001)

- Private Collections, a few examples:

-USA, Hawaii: Dr Ph Temple...

-Japan: Dr Sojo Hino...

-France: Seydoux de Clausonne, Albert Drachkovitch-Thomas, Jean Minet, Madame Follereau...

-Germany: Anna Spiegel von Stertz...

-Austria: Karl Kanzian, Dr Logman von Auen, Dr Thomas...

-France and USA: Mourlot collection ( Lithographs ).

== Honors and awards ==
- France

-Silver Medal Of Arts Sciences et Lettres (1988)

- Italy

-Professor Honoris Causa and Associated Academician of the Accademia Internazionale Greci-Marino di Lettere, Arti, Sciencze (1999)

-Chevalier ( Knight)Académique Del Verbano (2000)
