= Christian Attersee =

Austrian artist

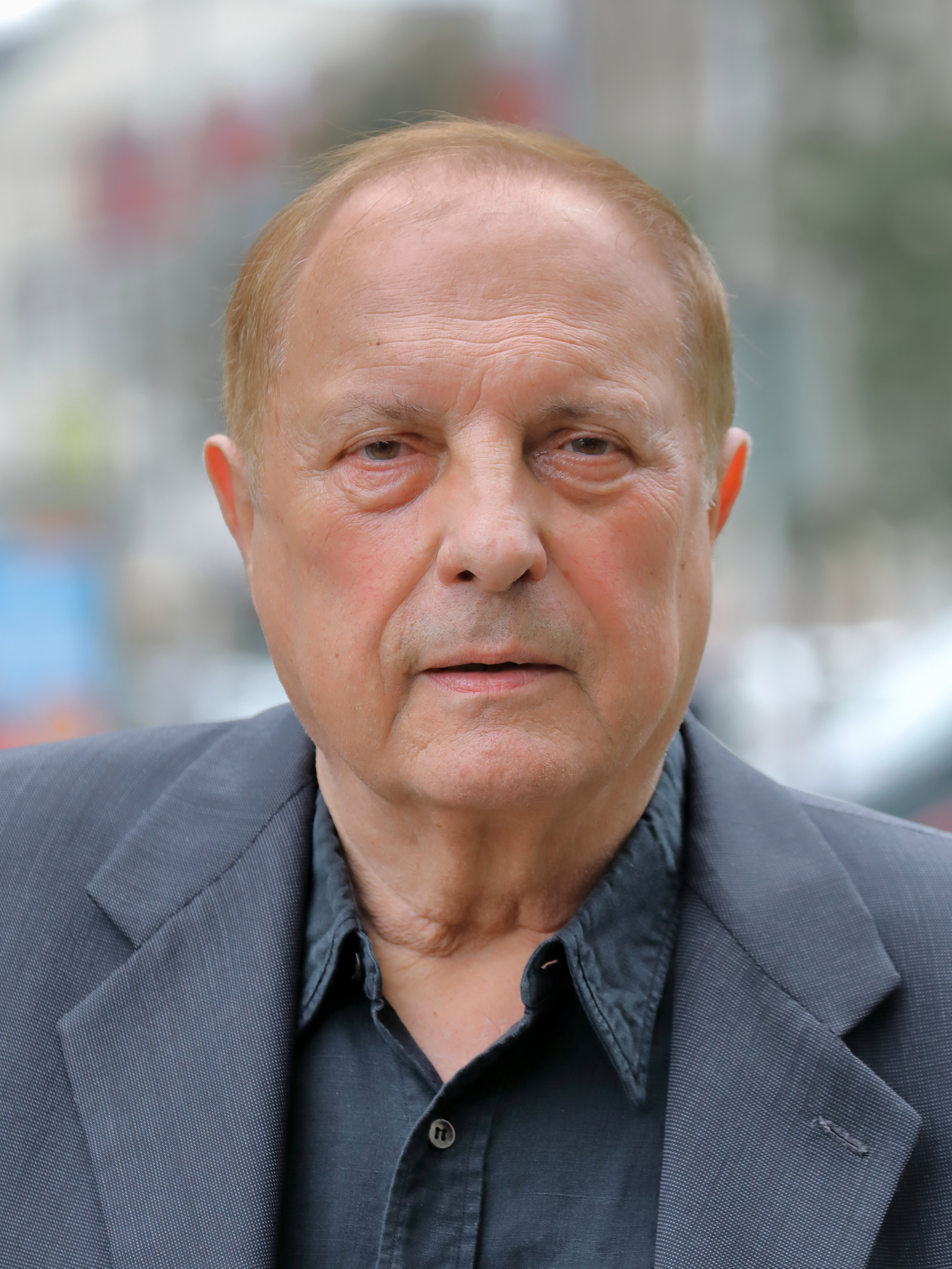
Christian Ludwig Attersee

Christian Ludwig Attersee (born Christian Ludwig on 28 August 1940 in Bratislava) is an Austrian artist.

== Biography ==
After he spent his youth in Upper Austria (also at the Attersee, the origin of his artist's name), Attersee began his studies in 1957 at the then-named Vienna Akademie für angewandte Kunst' (Academy of Applied Arts, in 1998 renamed to "University of Applied Arts") with E. Bäumer, keeping these up until 1963. From 1966 on, he was involved with the short-lived Viennese Actionism movement. Being very intrigued by object and action art from the start, Attersee attempted to combine music, speech, photo and video art with the basic form to create a new form of total artwork (also known by the German term Gesamtkunstwerk) like object inventions such as the "Speisekugel" ("food sphere"), the "Speiseblau" ("food blue"), the "Prothesenalphabet" ("prosthetical alphabet"), the "Speicheltönung" ("saliva tinge" or "saliva hue"), the female vagina as an object of art, as well as the self-coined "Attersteck". In later years, the quintessence of his work shall be characterized by subjects like sexuality and natural studies. One example is the provocative Kinderzimmertriptychon (Nursery Triptych) from 1971, which is inspired by a picture-book illustration of Fedor Flinzer.

His work is denoted by a figural-to-symbolic style transition, bright colors and an energetic ductus. Moreover, there are ambiguous, artsy connotations and imaginations of a likewise free-spirit and very Austrian mentality with a bias towards sexual malapropism. The context too gets incorporated into the artist's work many times, along with additional textual elements embedded into it.

Attersee's exhibitions are likely to be composed of art shows, accompanied by music and literature, and to some extent even by fellow artists attending and participating in the show.

In 1984, Attersee represented his home country at the Venice Biennial. Since 1990, he has held a chair at the Vienna University of Applied Arts and is one of the most renowned contemporary Austrian artists worldwide.

== Honours and awards ==
- City of Vienna Prize for Visual Arts (1989)
- Grand Austrian State Prize for Fine Arts (May 1998)
- Lovis Corinth Prize of Künstlergilde Esslingen, Baden-Wurttemberg (Summer 2004)
- Austrian Cross of Honour for Science and Art, 1st class (September 2005)
- Silver Commander's Cross of Honour for Services to the province of Lower Austria (2007)

== See also ==
- List of Austrian artists and architects
