= Betalevel =

Venue in Los Angeles, California

A performance at Betalevel

Betalevel (formerly c-level) is a venue located in a basement down an alley in Chinatown, Los Angeles, behind a Chinese restaurant, underneath the shops and art galleries of Chung King Road.

Betalevel hosts media events such as screenings, performances, classes, lectures, debates, dances, readings and tournaments. The LA Times describes it as having the furtive, secretive feel of a speakeasy.
