= ART.Welten =

ART.Welten is an Austrian association for independent artists. It was founded in 2005 by Monja Art, an Austrian film-maker and author, with the stated goal of being a place for artists to meet connected only by the "love of art".

ART.Welten focuses on the spreading of non-mainstream art, especially that which is of queer-interest or opposes to discrimination due to race, religion, sexual orientation, or disability.

== History and current status ==
=== History ===
While working on her first feature Anemonis, Monja Art founded the association ART.Welten with the two filmmakers and journalists Caroline Bobek and Patrick Dorner. Other founding members were Miha Veingerl and Bernhard Art.

=== Current status ===
ART.Welten has elected a new directorate. Monja Art is president, Caroline Bobek is deputy president. Both were accepted at the Filmacademy Vienna.

Antonia Barboric, Miha Veingerl, Patrick Dorner and Bernhard Art remain as members of the directorate.

== Completed ART.Welten projects ==
=== Feature film ===
- Anemonis (Monja Art, 2005)

=== Documentaries ===
- Mohnkugeln (Monja Art, 2009)
- ... was bleibt (Caroline Bobek, 2009)

=== Experimental short films ===
- Welcome to my prison (Monja Art, 2006)
- Mise en ordre (Caroline Bobek, 2007)
- Télé-vision (Caroline Bobek, 2007)
- Freude/Joy (Monja Art, 2007)
- Show me a rose garden (Monja Art, 2007)
- Lebenslagen (Caroline Bobek, 2007)
- Judas (Monja Art, 2007)
- Left, Untitled (Patrick Dorner, 2009)

=== Narrative short films ===
- The Cinematographer (Patrick Dorner, 2006)
- Ein Achterl und ein bisschen Liebe (Sebastian Leitner, 2006)
- Vorstellungen (Louis-Jeremy Spieß, 2006)
- Thinking (Louis-Jeremy Spieß, 2006)
- Schere, Stein, Papier (Louis-Jeremy Spieß, 2006)
- Nachtstück (Caroline Bobek, 2006)
- Behind the colours of the night (Monja Art, 2006)
- Mein Zimmer (Monja Art, 2007)
- Spaziergang (Monja Art, 2008)
- ROT (Monja Art, 2009)
- Die Tasche (Caroline Bobek, 2009)

=== Animated short films ===
- Gegen den Strom (Monja Art, 2007)

=== Found-footage experiments ===
- It's a digital world! (Patrick Dorner, 2005)
- Notes to anarchism (Patrick Dorner, 2006)
- Return to Laredo – Requiem for a Cowboy (Patrick Dorner, 2007)
- Filming Violence, 1891 – 1903 (Patrick Dorner, 2007)
- Zombie Evolution (Patrick Dorner, 2007)

=== Photography ===
- trop vite (Caroline Bobek, 2005)
- insonne (Andreas Schöttl, 2006)
- Invisible (Antonia Barboric, 2006)
- GONE (Monja Art, 2007)
- The new man (Antonia Barboric, 2007)
- People – Closeness – View (Antonia Barboric, 2007)
- At the busy crossing (Monja Art, 2007)
- Operation: Victoria (Caroline Bobek, 2007)
- Auschwitz (Antonia Barboric, 2008)
- waiting (Monja Art, 2008)
- silent (Monja Art, 2008)
- schlafend (Caroline Bobek, 2004–2008)

=== Literature ===
- Lesung und Vernissage (Antonia Barboric, 2007)
- Literaturwettbewerb "schauen", 2008
- Liebt einander! Die Vereinbarkeit von Homosexualität und christlichem Glauben (Monja Art, 2008)

=== Painting ===
- ART on AIR, 2006

=== Panel Discussion ===
- AWARE – ART.Weltens akademische Reihe, 2008

=== Remittance Works and Co-Productions ===
- Interview with Adi Halfin (Monja Art, 2007)

This was an interview for the website CHiLLi.cc

- AUS (punkt) (Louis-Jeremy Spieß, 2007)
- Le Retour du Fils (Rares Ienasoaie, 2007)
- Damenwahl (Ivan Koytschev, 2007)

== Participations and awards ==
- Anemonis: participated at the Alternative Film Festival Tromanale 2006 in Berlin, Germany
- Anemonis: Bronze Standard Award at the British International Amateur Film Festival 2006
- It's a digital world!: participated at the Cyprus International Film Festival 2006
- Welcome to my Prison: was awarded at the Festival der Nationen 2006
- Nachtstück: participated at the Judgement Night Festival 2007
- Nachtstück: participated at the Stolac Short Film Festival 2007
- Nachtstück: won a laudatory mention at shorts on screen 2007
