= Karin Hannak =

Austrian artist

- Born: 8 July 1940 (age 85); Wels, Nazi Germany (now Austria)

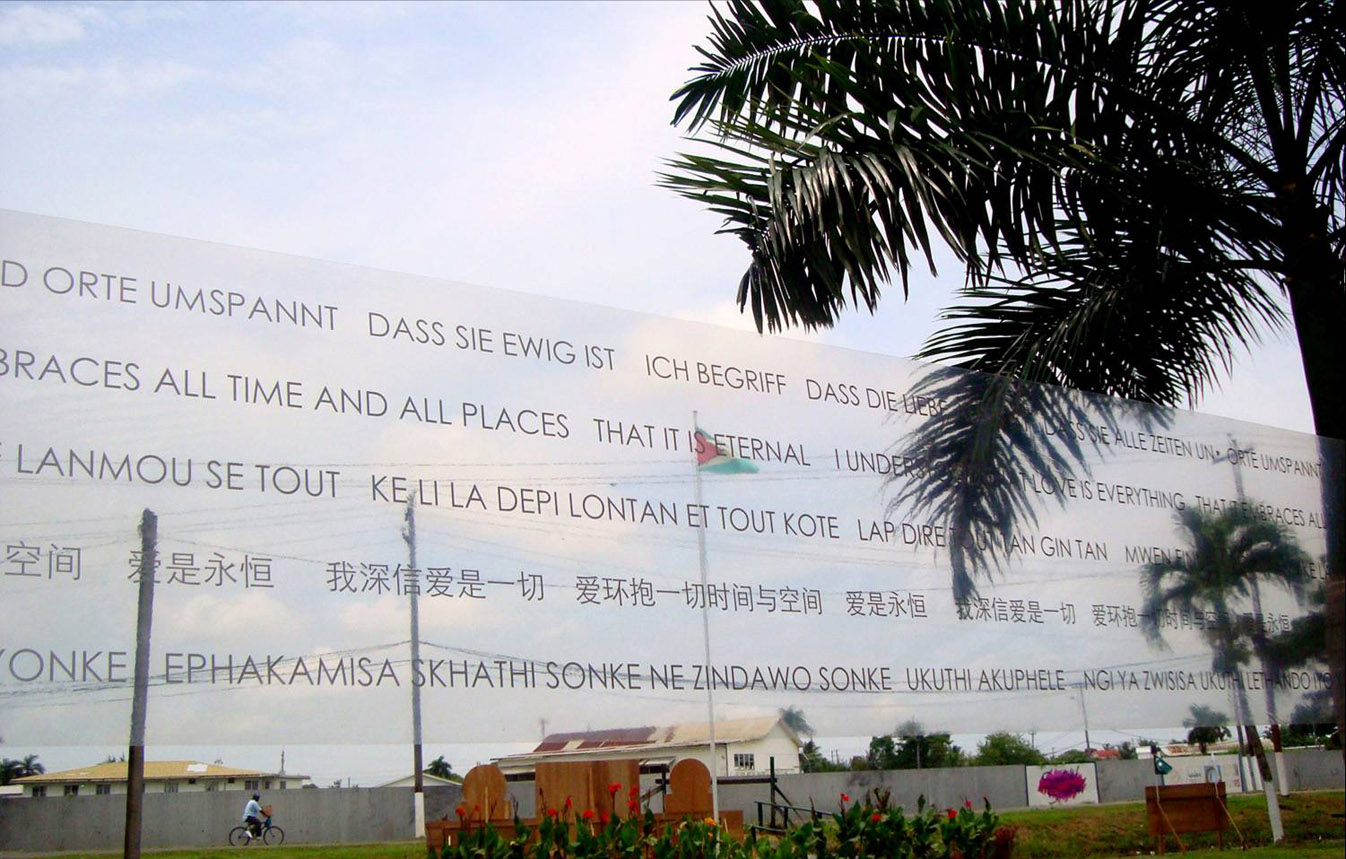
2008: "Embracing Time and Space" at the Caribbean Festival of Arts in Georgetown, Guyana

Karin Hannak (born 1940), is an Austrian artist. Her work includes capillographic, photographic, installation, video and conceptual art.

== Life ==
Karin Hannak received her artistic education with Prof. Anton Lehmden in Salzburg, Austria and Prof. Rudolf Kortokraks in Rome, Italy.

With a crucifixion depiction, painted by Karin Hannak in 1989, transience, time, eternity and, above all, love become themes that the artist deals with personally as well as repeatedly in her work. In 1990, there is a change in the means of expression from painting to CapilloArt (art with human hair). As of 1993, installations follow. After 9/11, human suffering, as well as the concern for the future of our world, become central topics for which the artist found even more possibilities of expression. Karin Hannak's work is a contribution against the violence and brutality of our time. She also often combines her artistic activities with calls to humanity and interpersonal solidarity.

The artist showed projects for peaceful community at festivals and exhibitions in museums, galleries and public spaces. Hannak's multi-part project European Landscape, which was carried out on the occasion of Austria's EU Presidency in 2006 and is an indication of the great responsibility for the future of our children that lies in our decisions, was attended by town halls, museums, galleries, universities and schools in all countries of the European Union. From 2008, the artist began to encompass the world with Embracing Time and Space (ETAS), a symbol of love and peace in the form of a transparent foil banner with a quotation from Thérèse by Lisieux.

Karin Hannak is married and has two children. She is a member of the Austrian Artists' Society, Vienna Künstlerhaus, INTAKT - International Action Group of Fine Artists Vienna

== Exhibitions and presentations (partial) ==
- 1990 Lancut Castle / Polen
- 1994 Votivkirche Vienna - public space Vienna / Austria
- 2000 Gallery Forum Wels / Austria
- 2003 Künstlerhaus Vienna / Austria
- 2006 Galleria Laboratorio2 International / Udine / Italy
- 2007 Museumsquartier Vienna / Austria, National Museum Bratislava / Slovakia, Art Hall Tallinn / Estonia, Lentos Museum of Art / Linz / Austria
- 2008 Künstlerhaus Vienna / Austria, Olympic Fine Arts 2008/ Beijing International Exhibition Center/ Peking/ China, Caribbean Festival of Arts 2008/ Georgetown/ Guyana
- 2009 Town Hall / Penang / Malaysia, Mariendom Linz / Austria,
- 2009 Fourth World Summit on Arts & Culture / Drill Hall / Johannesburg / South Africa ETAS
- 2011 Donau Park / Vienna / Austria: Peace Moves
- 2012 Memorial im Park Martissant / Port-au-Prince / Haiti: ETAS
- 2013 Palais Clam Gallas / Vienna / Austria: en mouvement - in bewegung - Paris-Wien
- 2013 Künstlerhaus / Vienna / Austria: zeichnen zeichnen
- 2014 Cairo Opera House / Kairo / Ägypten, National Cultural Center Zamalek / Kairo / Ägypten: Global Curls for Egyptian Girls
- 2015 Gallery Forum Wels: Pink Dream[3]
- 2015 Künstlerhaus / Vienna / Austria: Über:Macht / Brennende Fragen. Global Curls - Work in Progress for Women's Rights Worldwide
- 2016 Atelier Suterena / Vienna / Austria: Minifesta. Capillo Concentration Camp
- 2017 Contemporary Art Museum / Neapel / Italien: You No Speak Americano Original
- 2017 Art Hall Exnergasse, Vienna / Austria: 40 Years IntAkt
- 2017 Städtische Galerie Fruchthalle / Rastatt / Germany: Sammlung Westermann
- 2018 City Museum / Leonding / Austria: Karin Hannak - Human Mirror
- 2019 Palazzo Mora/ Venice/ Italy PERSONAL STRUCTURES in the context of the 58. International Art Biennale
- 2020 Schlossmuseum Linz / Austria
