= Martina Steckholzer =

- Born: 1974 (age 51–52); Sterzing, South Tyrol, Italy

Martina Steckholzer (born 1974) is an artist based in Vienna. She studied Fine Arts at the University of Applied Arts Vienna with Gunter Damisch and Heimo Zobernig.

== Work ==
Work by Steckholzer is in the collections of the Saatchi Gallery, Museion and the Österreichische Galerie Belvedere, Vienna.

Her art is based on architecture and the interplay of different kinds of surfaces and lighting.
