= Gustav Mezey =

Gustav Mezey (also Gustav Masirevits, 1899–1981) was an Austrian artist.

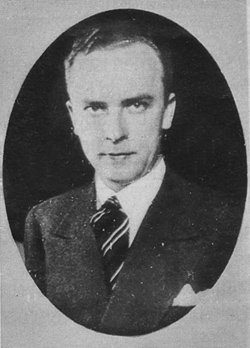
Portrait of Gustav Mezey (1930)

In the early 1920s, Hungarian-born Mezey embarked upon an artistic career that would span more than four decades. His outstanding talent and pioneering spirit made him one of Europe's most recognized commercial artists of his time. Producing advertisements for several well-known companies in Budapest, Belgrade, Trieste, Berlin and Vienna, he soon specialized in large outdoor poster designs for the newly emerging film industry. From the early 1930s to the late 1950s, he created movie posters and large-scale portraits of movie stars in his unique paint/airbrush technique for most of the classic European and American film producers, including UFA, Terra, Tobis, Sascha, MGM and Rank Organisation. During this period Mezey refined his bold, exciting colour compositions to a trend-setting and unparalleled level; yet, in his lifetime, Gustav's talent and skills were only seen as professional tools of advertising. His surviving original artworks have since become rare and valued collector's items.

== Mezey artwork exhibitions ==
- Gewerbehaus - Vienna, 1978 (Kunst im Handwerk)
- Wiener Hofburg - Vienna, 1984 (Film Posters and Star Portraits)
- Ad Art Gallery - Vienna, 1984 (Reklame aus den 30'ern und 40'ern)
- New Art Gallery - Boston, 1997 (Film Poster Design)
- Sydney Graphics College - Sydney, 2005 (Visual Seducers - Three decades of advertising design)
