= Homophobia (film) =

2012 Austrian short film by Gregor Schmidinger

- Theatrical release poster
- Directed by: Gregor Schmidinger
- Written by: Gregor Schmidinger
- Produced by: Gregor Schmidinger; Julian Wiehl
- Starring: Michael Glantschnig; Josef Mohamed; Günther Sturmlechner; Harald Bodingbauer
- Cinematography: Nino Leitner
- Edited by: Gregor Schmidinger
- Music by: Herbert Verdino; Jakob Wolf
- Release dates: 11 May 2012 (Gartenbaukino); 14 May 2012 (Online)
- Running time: 23 minutes
- Country: Austria
- Language: Austrian German

Homophobia is a 2012 Austrian short film directed by Gregor Schmidinger and produced by Schmidinger and Julian Wiehl. The film had its premiere in Vienna on 11 May 2012, and was released online on 14 May 2012 as a contribution to the International Day Against Homophobia, Transphobia and Biphobia on 17 May 2012. The film stars Michael Glantschnig, Josef Mohamed, Günther Sturmlechner and Harald Bodingbauer. Homophobia is set in the 1990s during the winter solstice, and is about a young Austrian soldier, Michael (played by Glantschnig), who attempts suicide using a firearm, because of bullying over his homosexuality, during a watch on the Austrian-Hungarian border on the last night of his seven-week military service.

== Plot ==
According to Vangardist, the film is set in the 1990s during the winter solstice and shows the "contrasts [of] the hyper-masculine world of military service". It begins with a scene at night, showing Raphael (played by Josef Mohamed) pushing a gun into Michael's mouth (played by Michael Glantschnig); both are wearing military uniforms. The film then introduces to Michael, a young, gay Austrian soldier, in a military camp, who wakes up, vomits into a toilet, and starts crying. Entering the bathroom for a shower, Jürgen (played by Günther Sturmlechner) holds him from behind while Raphael turns cold water on him. After throwing Jürgen to the floor, Michael disappears to the cloakroom. Jürgen approaches him again and claims to know "all about [his] little secret," his homosexuality, while he touches Michael's body, and then throws him against a wall. When asked later by the commanding officer (played by Harald Bodingbauer) about the resulting wound on his eyebrow, Michael lies, telling him he slipped in the bathroom. Preparing for a watch on the Austrian-Hungarian border on the last night of a seven-week military service, Michael hears Jürgen joking about homosexuality with two fellow platoon mates.

Michael finally arrives with his duty partner Raphael at a tent in a forest for their eight-hour watch. Later when they sit together on what appears to be a bank, Raphael starts talking about his girlfriend, but seems unsure about his sexual orientation. He also apologises for his bad behaviour towards Michael and offers him a cigarette. After smoking cannabis with Raphael, Michael, who experiences a rush from the drug, attempts to kiss him. Raphael fends him off aggressively. After this, Michael takes his gun and walks away, first pointing it at Raphael, and then wanting to commit suicide by shooting himself because of the bullying by his fellow soldiers. A desperate Raphael demands that Michael put the gun down, and finally manages to get the weapon out of his hands. Michael then falls to the ground and starts to cry. The film ends with Raphael hugging him.

== Background and production ==
Prior to the release of Homophobia, Schmidinger released the gay-themed short film The Boy Next Door in 2008. One of his inspirations for Homophobia was the suicide of Jamey Rodemeyer in 2011, attributed to bullying due to his homosexuality, and a video Rodemeyer had submitted for the Internet-based 501(c)3 non-profit It Gets Better Project. A casting call for the film was issued online, with actors sending "motivational" videos stating why they wished to join the cast. Although the title of the film was deemed generic by the audience, Schmidinger defended it as it "provides a way of reaching a broader audience with a single word: search engine optimization meets art".

For filming, a Canon EOS C300 was chosen for its ability to film low light scenes, and the camera's sharpness. Electric generator trucks were used for some low light sequences. With the local mayor's support, the film was shot at a former tobacco factory in Linz that had been repurposed to host film and other art productions, and the woods surrounding it. Several scenes have the actors' faces very near to the camera. For the filming of a bathroom scene, several male actors had to be nude. Money for the film's production was raised through crowdfunding on the Indiegogo website, where $10,100 was donated in 69 days. People who donated were invited to be a "dynamic" part of the project and to visit a Facebook forum, where they could review the ongoing production and make suggestions. The project was also supported financially by the Queeren Kleinprojektetopf organization in Vienna. The box office earnings were donated to the It Gets Better project.

Homophobia was originally intended to have a happy ending, but it was removed by Schmidinger. In an interview, he confessed, "a cheesy ending was out of the question for me. ... The happy endings of feature movies never really happen in real life. Still, I think and hope that the audience will be left with a positive feeling at the end of the film." During a behind-the-scenes video, it was revealed that the final scene was to have featured Michael and Raphael meeting as friends at a train station after their military service.

== Release ==
Homophobia is a story I wanted to tell for several years. [...] I wanted to contribute to the, unfortunately, current "Gay Bullying" theme. I knew that now, it is the right time to launch the project. Not only because the subject matter is particularly relevant in the USA, but also because I have now achieved the necessary emotional and artistic maturity needed to implement this project.

— Schmidinger on Homophobia on FM4.

Homophobia's premiere was a special event at the Gartenbaukino in Vienna on 11 May 2012 at around 21:00. The audience included the film's supporters and invited guests from politics, media and business. A meat market, "Homophobia Is Not Invited", was also launched supporting the release of the film. Homophobia was uploaded onto Schmidinger's YouTube channel on 14 May 2012 as a contribution to the International Day Against Homophobia, Transphobia and Biphobia on 17 May 2012. It was also intended to be shown in schools to "facilitate a dialogue about homophobia and self-acceptance," and was handed both offline and online to other film festivals. For marketing purposes, Manuel Dünfründt was hired as a publicist. Response to the "abrupt" and "gloomy" ending was primarily negative.

== Controversy ==
In February 2017, the bathroom scene sparked controversy for possibly featuring a 25-year-old man in the background, known as Harald Z. Under the alias of Harald Hitler, he had been arrested that month for glorifying Adolf Hitler, by impersonating him in Braunau am Inn, a punishable offense in Austria. When interviewed by Vice magazine, Schmidinger responded, "We think he is it. We do not really know him and had no contact with him after the [film's] premiere in 2012. At that time, we searched online for extras and he showed up. We are just a bit perplexed." Harald Z. is credited as part of the film's cast.
