= Schloss Saxental =

Castle in Austria

Saxental Castle
- Schloss Saxental
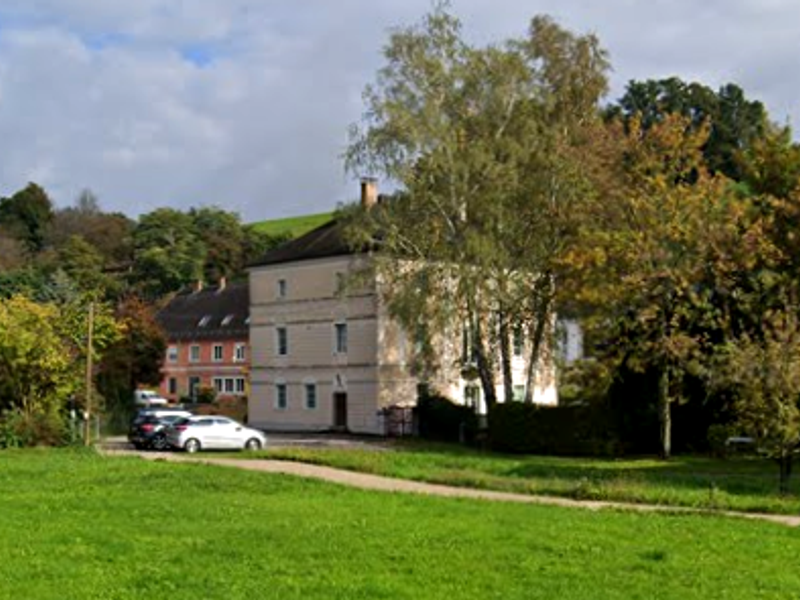
- Saxental Palace in 2023

- Location within Austria

General information
- Location: Austria
- Coordinates: 48°12′25″N 14°47′32″E
- Completed: first third of 19th century

Schloss Saxental ("Saxental Castle") located in the town of Saxen in the Perg district, Upper Austria, can be viewed as the last remaining part of the former Sachsenthal castle complex ("Feste Sechsen")., which was mentioned in documents in the 13th and 14th centuries.

The main three-story building of Schloss Saxental, with its late classicist facade, originally served as a retirement home for the Count Clam-Martinic.

== Location ==
Today, Schloss Saxental is located at the eastern outskirts of the market town of Saxen on the west bank of the river Sachesn (Sachsenerbach), in the immediate vicinity of the Saxen municipal office.

== Building description ==
The building is a small three-story building with a hipped roof. The four sides of the facade are attractively designed and each has its own individual structure, which is rare.

== Monument protection ==
The object of the proceedings appears to be in the ordinance of the Federal Monuments Office concerning the political district of Perg, Upper Austria under the name Ansitz Saxental.

== Artistic and historical significance ==
The Federal Monuments Office commissioned a new evaluation in 2022, in which the significance of the object as a monument was confirmed:

"The building, designed in typical forms of late classicism, shows the range of architecture of the first third of the 19th century on four differently structured facades. This is particularly evident in the double pilaster structure of the upper floors, the rich window decorations with parapet and lintel decoration, and elaborate framing and roofs as well as the wrought iron balcony on the garden side. A special feature is the elaborate, richly decorated facade design, which is individually formed on each front side and is rarely found in this form. The north-west and north-east facades are richer and more magnificently structured and present themselves as Main view sides, as they faced the street and were therefore visible to everyone. This rich design illustrates the client's desire to show his building to the outside as a representative of stately building. The garden view side is particularly accentuated by the wrought iron balcony, while the plaster structure is somewhat is made simpler. The southwest façade stands out due to the small, iconographically remarkable relief above the entrance portal and the grooves extending over two floors."

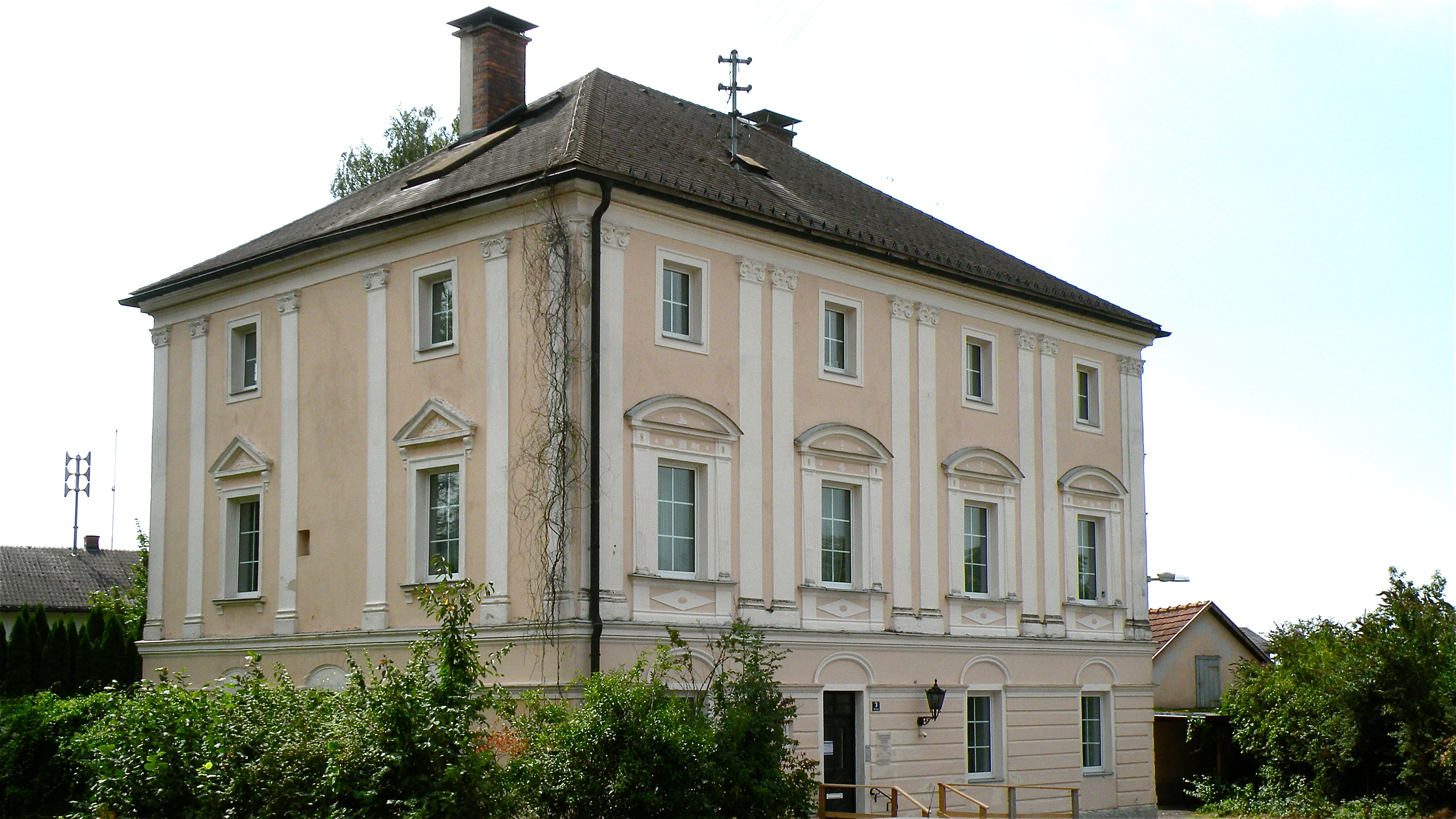
Saxenthal Castle seen from the north

"The Clam family, members of the Austrian nobility, whose ancestors had settled in the country above the Enns since the end of the 15th century, had a significant influence on the cultural and economic history of the region, which is why this retirement home of Counts Clam is of historical importance. In its function as a retirement home For Count Clam, it also has a special social-historical significance. The nobles of the older generation often retreated to smaller, somewhat remote mansions and mansions in order to be able to leave the main headquarters to the next generation, as was the case with the Luisenschlösschen in Stetteldorf am Wagram as the widow's residence of Countess Hardegg. For this purpose, existing buildings were either adapted or new ones were constructed. In Saxen, as in the comparative example, a building was constructed incorporating older parts of a previous building. These are still impressively presented in the rising masonry in the basement and ground floor as well as in the barrel and stitch cap barrel vaults inside the two floors. These furnishing elements therefore have a special significance in terms of building history."

== Ownership ==
The estate of Saxental, on which Schloss Saxental has been built, was mentioned as a sovereign fiefdom in the 13th century under Wilhelm and Wolfgang Hauser. The seat subsequently passed to the Wolfstein family, who also owned Clam Castle (until 1460). Both properties fell to Emperor Friedrich III, who gave them to the Prueschenk family. In 1648, the seat owned by the Perger zu Clam was elevated to a noble seat and, after Empress Maria Theresia bestowed the status of imperial count on the family, it was subsequently owned by the family of Count Clam-Martinic.

In 1925, Schloss Saxental was acquired by the municipality of Saxen, which renovated the castle and rented to doctors over a long period of time. In 1983, the second floor was adapted into an apartment and part of the attic was expanded. The municipality of Saxen considered relocating the Saxen municipal office to Saxental Castle in 2022, but these plans were rejected in favor of a new municipal office building, which made the sale of the castle possible.

In 2022, the castle was acquired by an investment company of Heinrich Polsterer, a private investor from Götzendorf in Lower Austria who began the revitalization of the aging property.

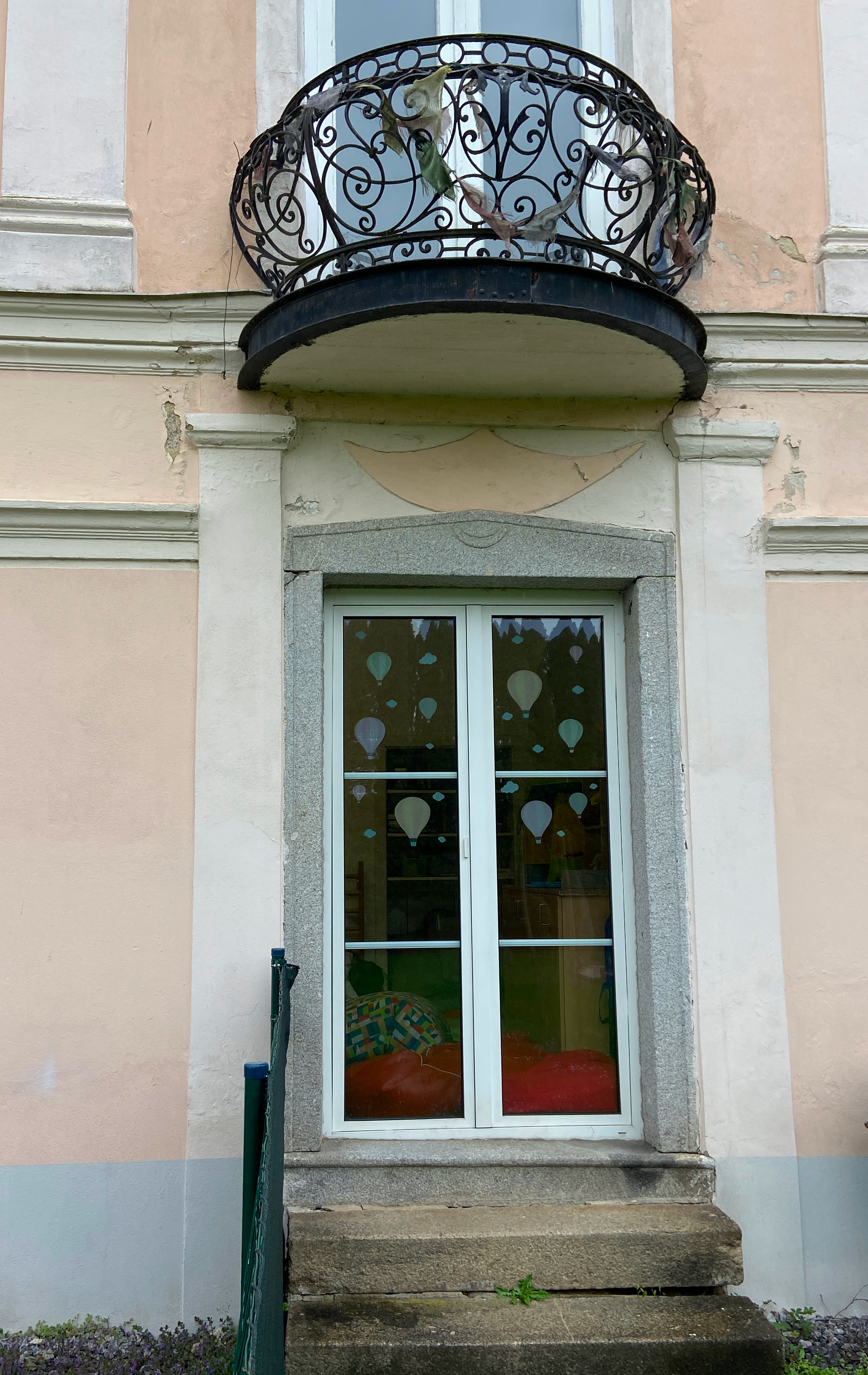
South entrance

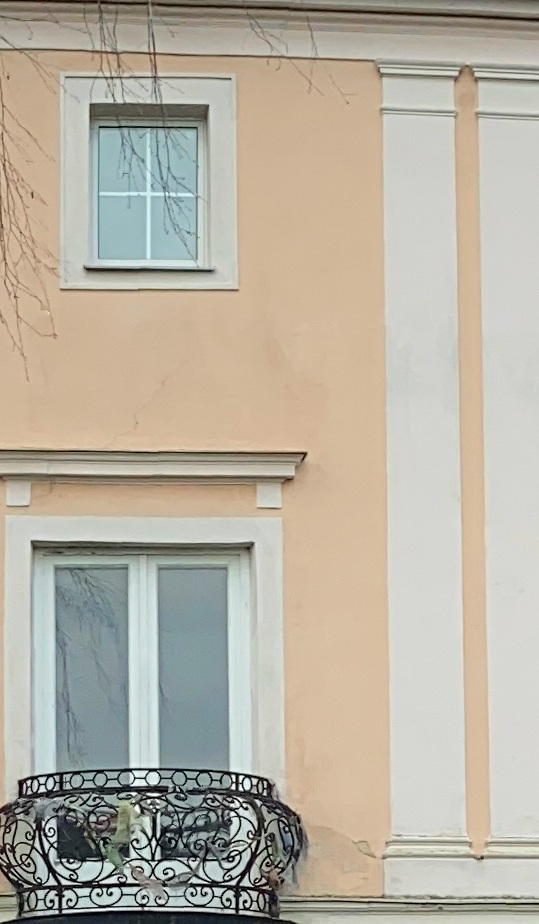
Detail South facade

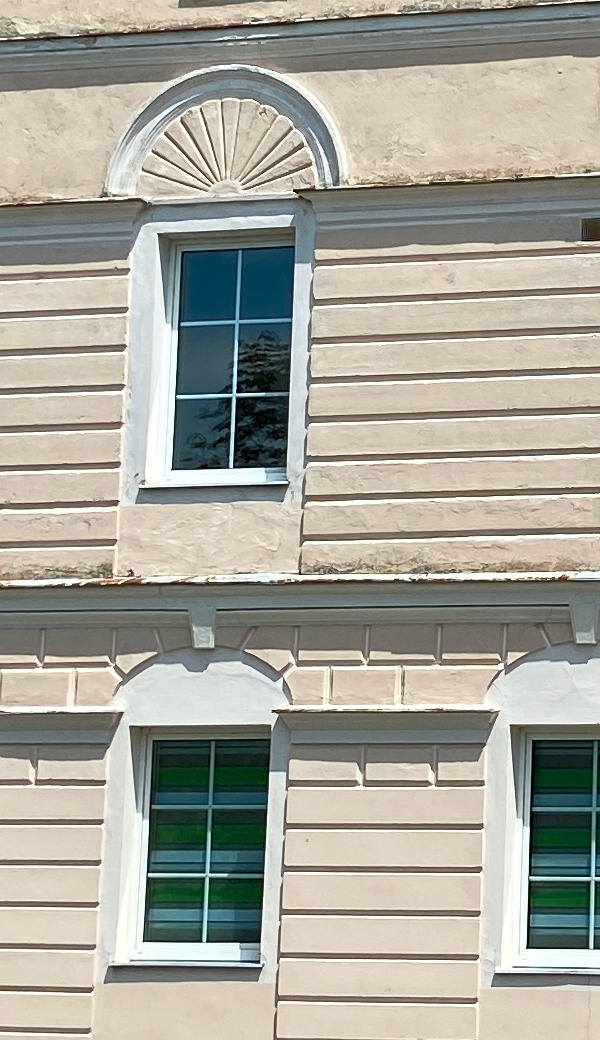
Detail West facade

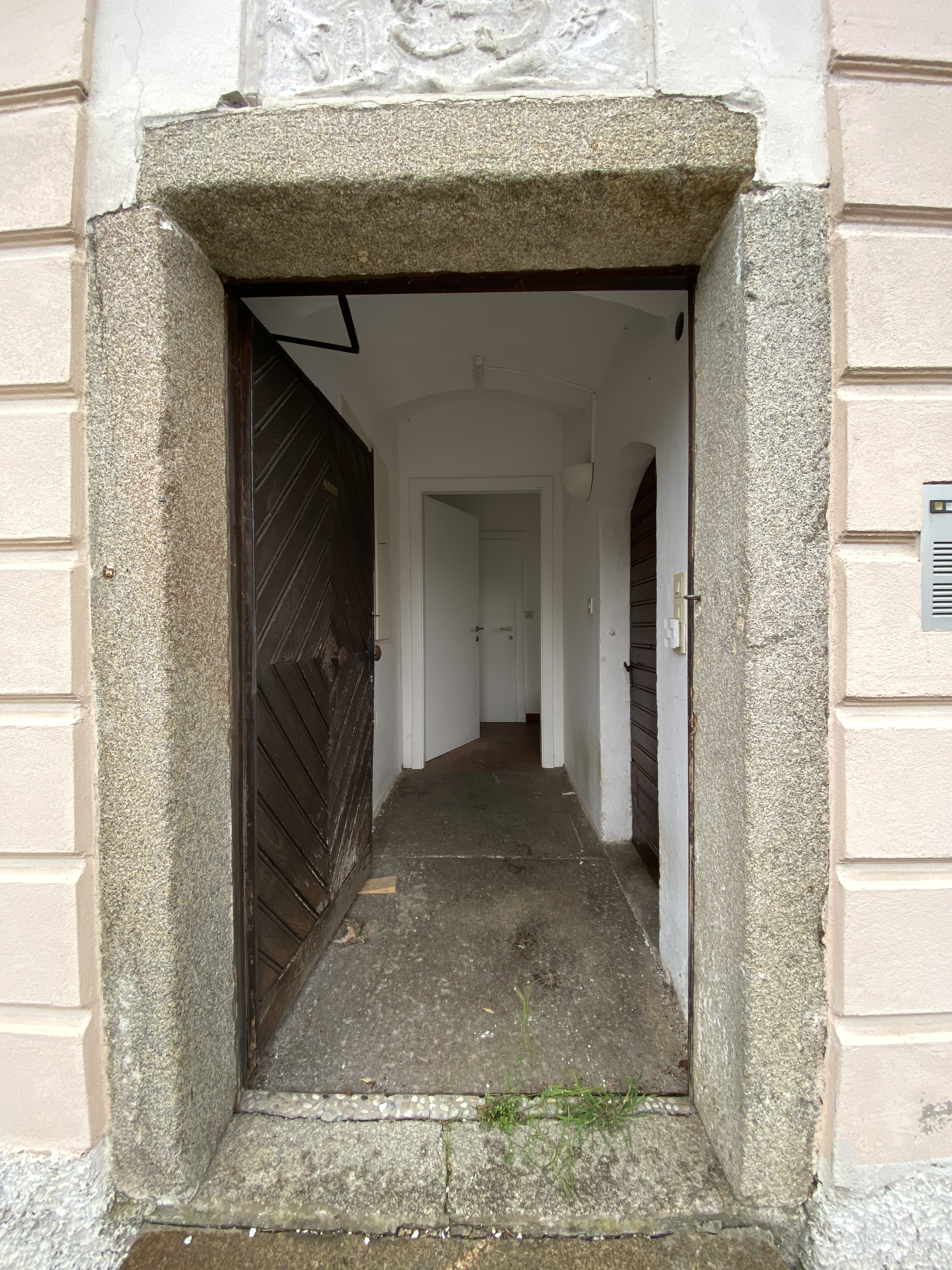
West entrance
