= Venus of Langenzersdorf =

Early Lengyel figurine of Venus

Coordinates: 48.3102°N 16.3622°E

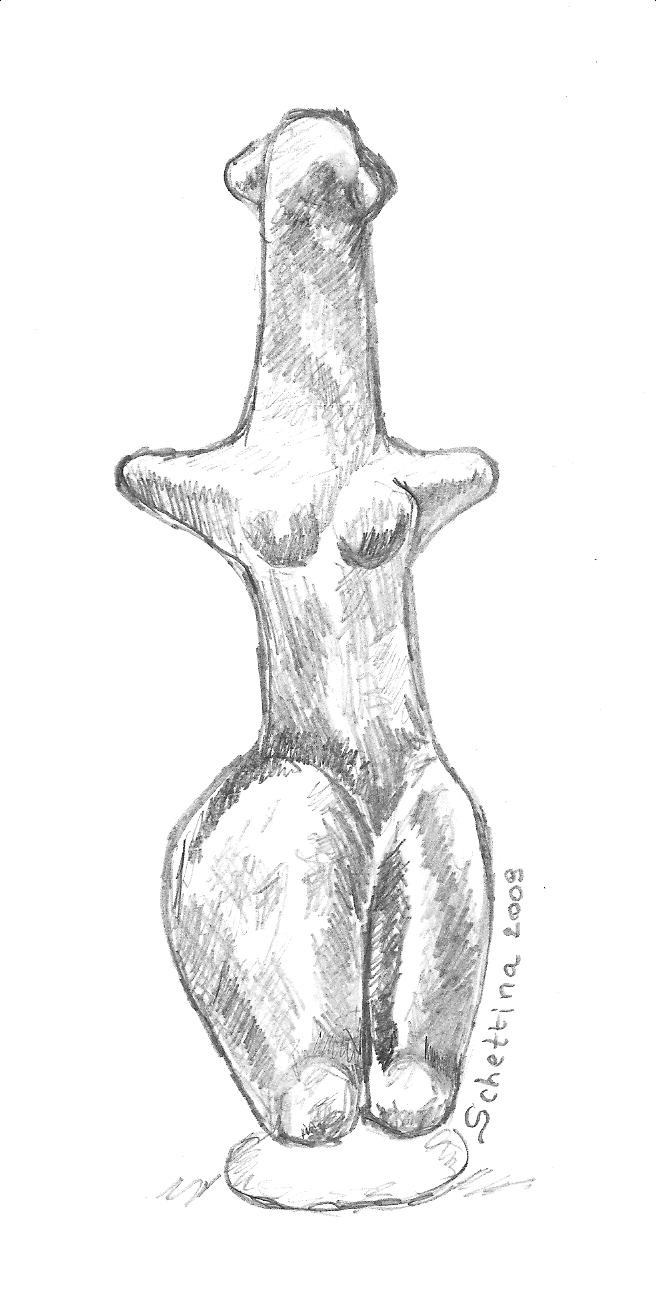
- Karditsa Thinker at the National Archaeological Museum, Athens
- Material: Clay
- Height: 18 cm
- Created: c. 4825 BC
- Discovered: 21 December 1955; Langenzersdorf, Lower Austria, Austria

Venus of Langenzersdorf is an 18-cm tall figurine of nude female body found in 1955/56 in Langenzersdorf, Austria. It is placed in the context of early Lengyel culture.

== Discovery ==
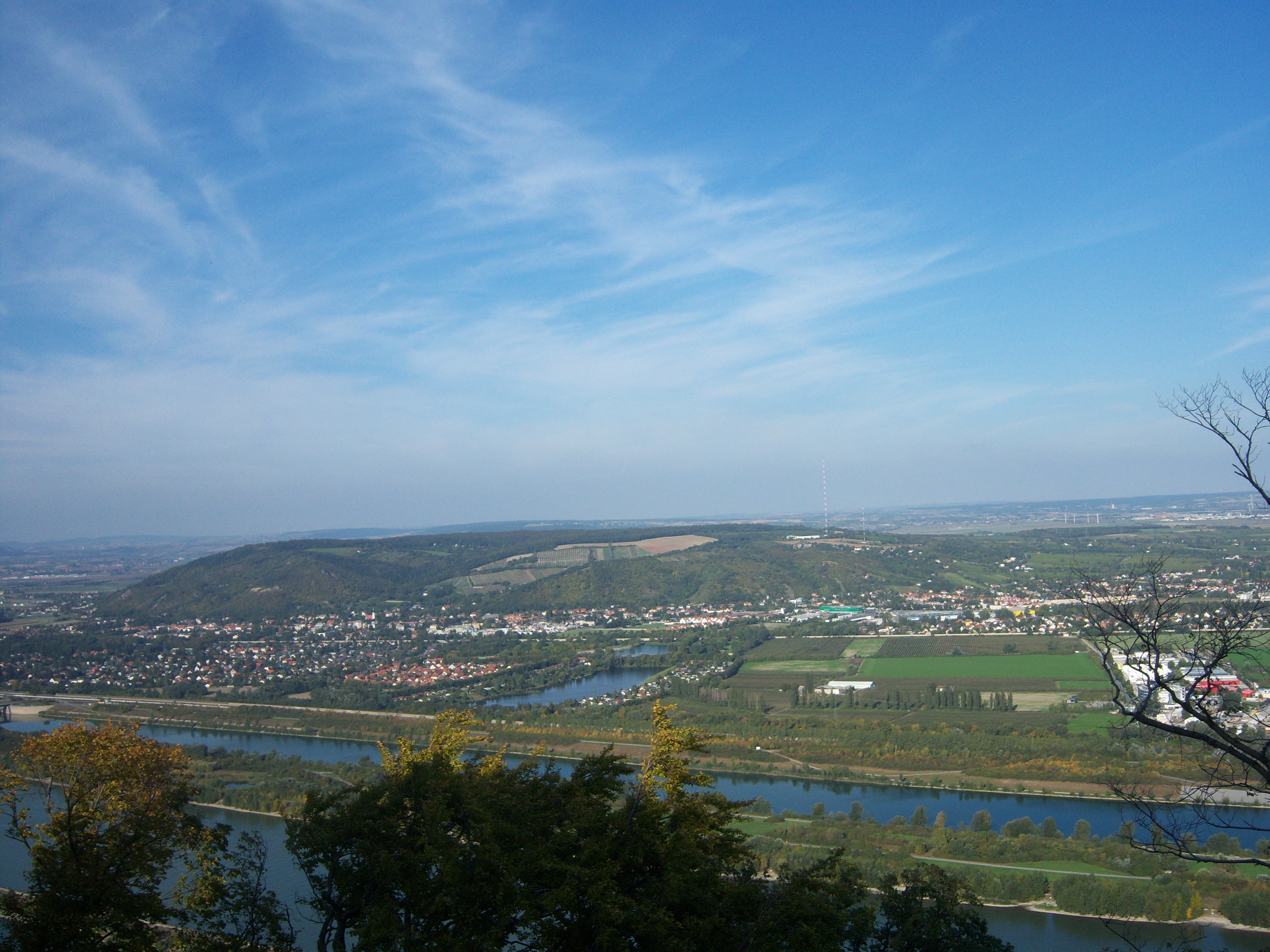
View from Leopoldsberg over the Danube river at the Bisamberg mountain

The figurine was uncovered during excavation commissioned by Federal Monuments Office, with an assistance of the Museum Langenzersdorf. The Venus figurine was found in four fragments near a hearth, within the context of a settlement remains from the time of the Lengyel culture, on the southern slope of the mountain Bisamberg in the Korneuburg District, Lower Austria. The first fragment, the right thigh, was discovered on December 21, 1955.

== Description ==
The statuette is dated to around 5000 BC. It has an elongated upper body, whereas the lower body is relatively shortened and with prominent hips (speculated to be a symbol and fertility and fecundity). The arms are stretched in the lateral direction and only hinted at. The breasts are not as stressed or big as Upper-Palaeolithic figurines of that kind. The head is positioned on a long neck and completely abstracted, without recognizable face. Unlike Upper-Palaeolithic figurines, the pubic triangle is not emphasized.

The statues was made of dark-brown clay, mixed with small stones, then molded and fired. The age of 4825 (±90) BC was established using radiocarbon dating of the associated organic material.

== Worth knowing ==
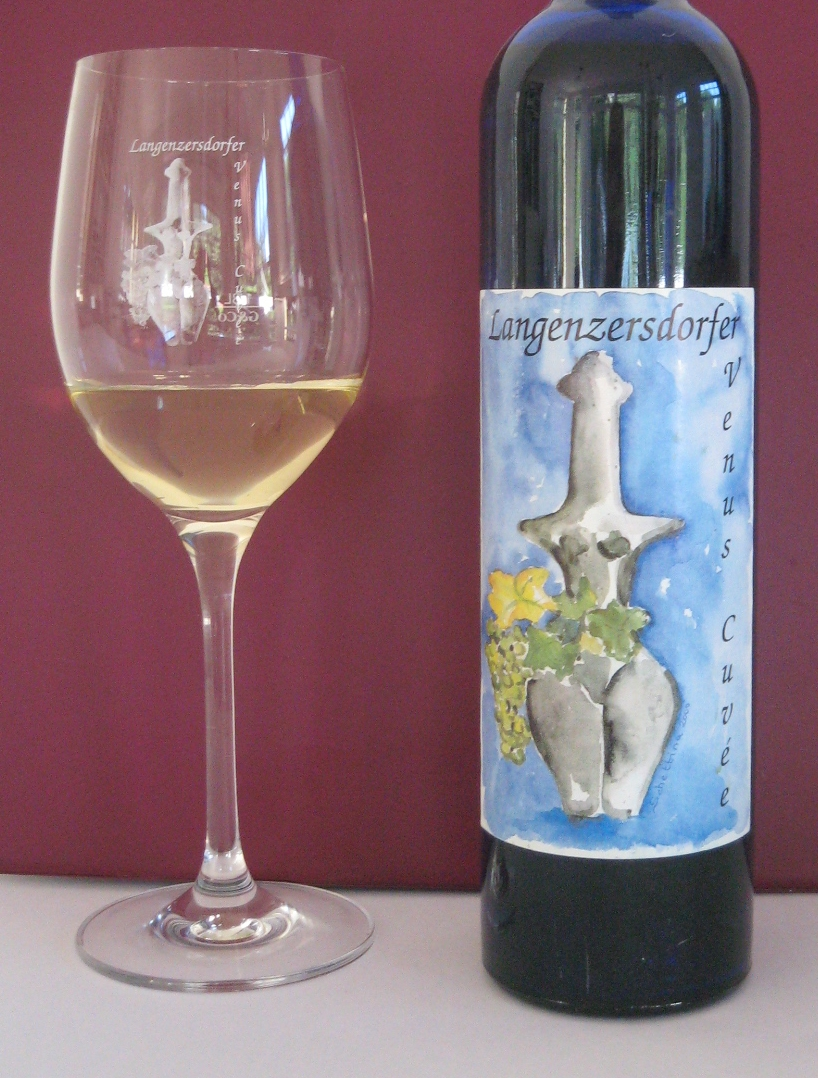
Venus Cuvée

Since 2000, the figurine is used in marketing of Venus-Cuvée wine-blend produced locally in Lower Austria.
