= Großrußbach =

- Municipality
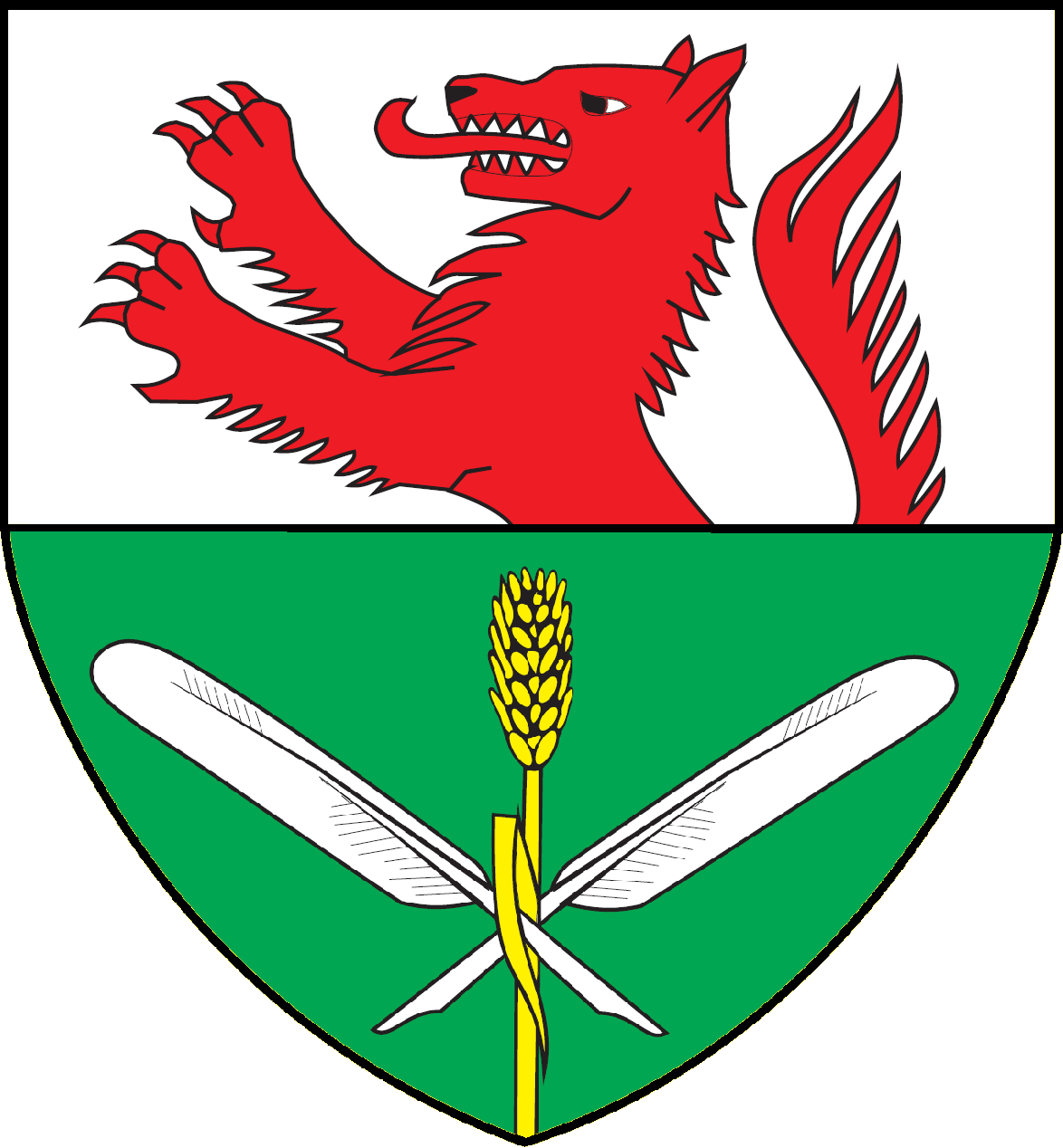
- Coat of arms

- Location within Austria
- Coordinates: 48°28′N 16°25′E
- Country: Austria
- State: Lower Austria
- District: Korneuburg

Government
  - Mayor: Johann Müller

Area
  - Total: 32.74 km^{2} (12.64 sq mi)
- Elevation: 291 m (955 ft)

Population (2018-01-01)
  - Total: 2,194
  - Density: 67.01/km^{2} (173.6/sq mi)
- Time zone: UTC+1 (CET)
  - Summer (DST): UTC+2 (CEST)
- Postal code: 2114
- Area code: 02263
- Website: www.grossrussbach.at

Großrußbach is a town in the district of Korneuburg in Lower Austria in Austria

== Geography ==
It lies about 17 km north of Korneuburg hin the Weinviertel in Lower Austria. About 14.2 percent of the municipality is forested.
