= Venus of Ocice =

The Venus of Ottitz or Venus of Ocice (Polish: Wenus Ocicka) is a Neolithic clay statuette of a female figure found in 1909 within the current city limits of Racibórz (Racibórz-Ocice), Silesia (nowadays Poland, then Germany). The ceramic original has been lost after World War II, but several copies exist. A gypsum copy is exhibited in the Museum of Racibórz.

It was discovered in 1909 and described as figurine of Ottitz near Ratibor (i.e., German nameplaces were used). At that time, it was speculated to be "the most ancient model of human form in existence".

In 2013, a press article reported a similar figurine found recently near Raciborz. It is undamaged and is also referred to as "Venus of Ocice". The figurine depicts a feminine body which is slim and has small breast and buttocks, but is wide in hips and thighs. The hands and head are apparently omitted (or only symbolically marked) by the artist. It has been placed in 4th millennium BC.

== See also ==
- Venus of Langenzersdorf
- Dzielnica, Opole Voivodeship#Neolithic Site
