= Harmannsdorf =

- Municipality
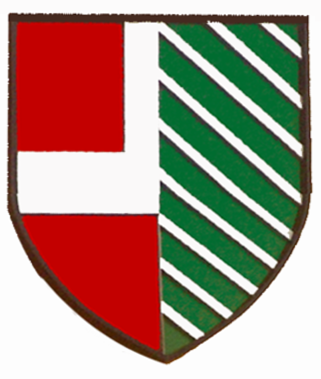
- Coat of arms

- Location within Austria
- Coordinates: 48°24′N 16°22′E
- Country: Austria
- State: Lower Austria
- District: Korneuburg

Government
  - Mayor: Alexander Raicher

Area
  - Total: 55.54 km^{2} (21.44 sq mi)
- Elevation: 180 m (590 ft)

Population (2018-01-01)
  - Total: 3,951
  - Density: 71.14/km^{2} (184.2/sq mi)
- Time zone: UTC+1 (CET)
  - Summer (DST): UTC+2 (CEST)
- Postal code: 2111 / 2112
- Area code: 02264 / 02263
- Website: www.harmannsdorf.gv.at

Harmannsdorf is a municipality of Korneuburg in Austria.

== Geography ==
It lies about 5 km north of Korneuburg in the Weinviertel in Lower Austria. About 27.59 percent of the municipality is forested.

It has seven subdivisions: Rückersdorf-Harmannsdorf, Hetzmannsdorf, Kleinrötz, Mollmannsdorf, Obergänserndorf, Seebarn, and Würnitz-Lerchenau;

== Gallery ==
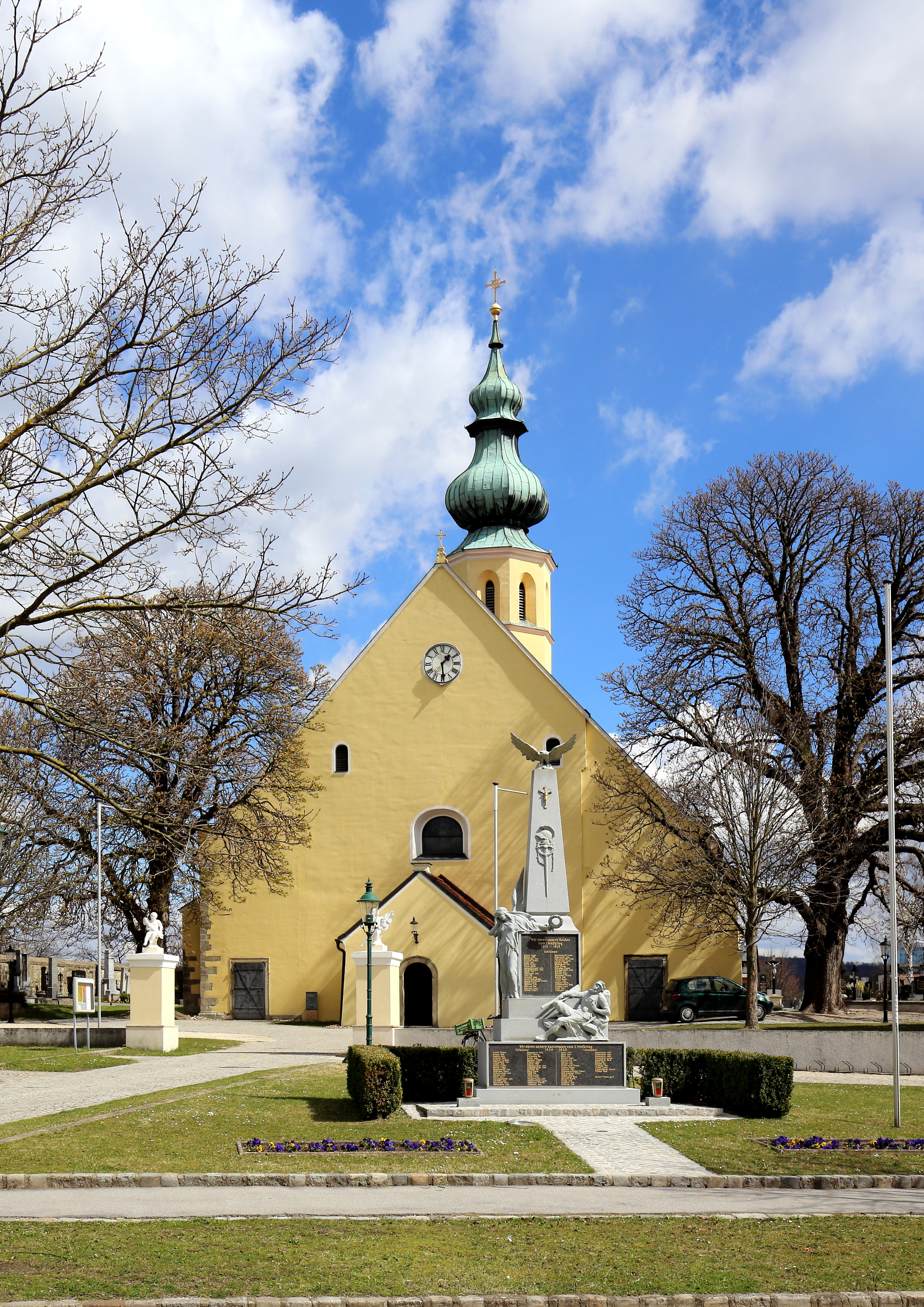
Parish church of Rückersdorf

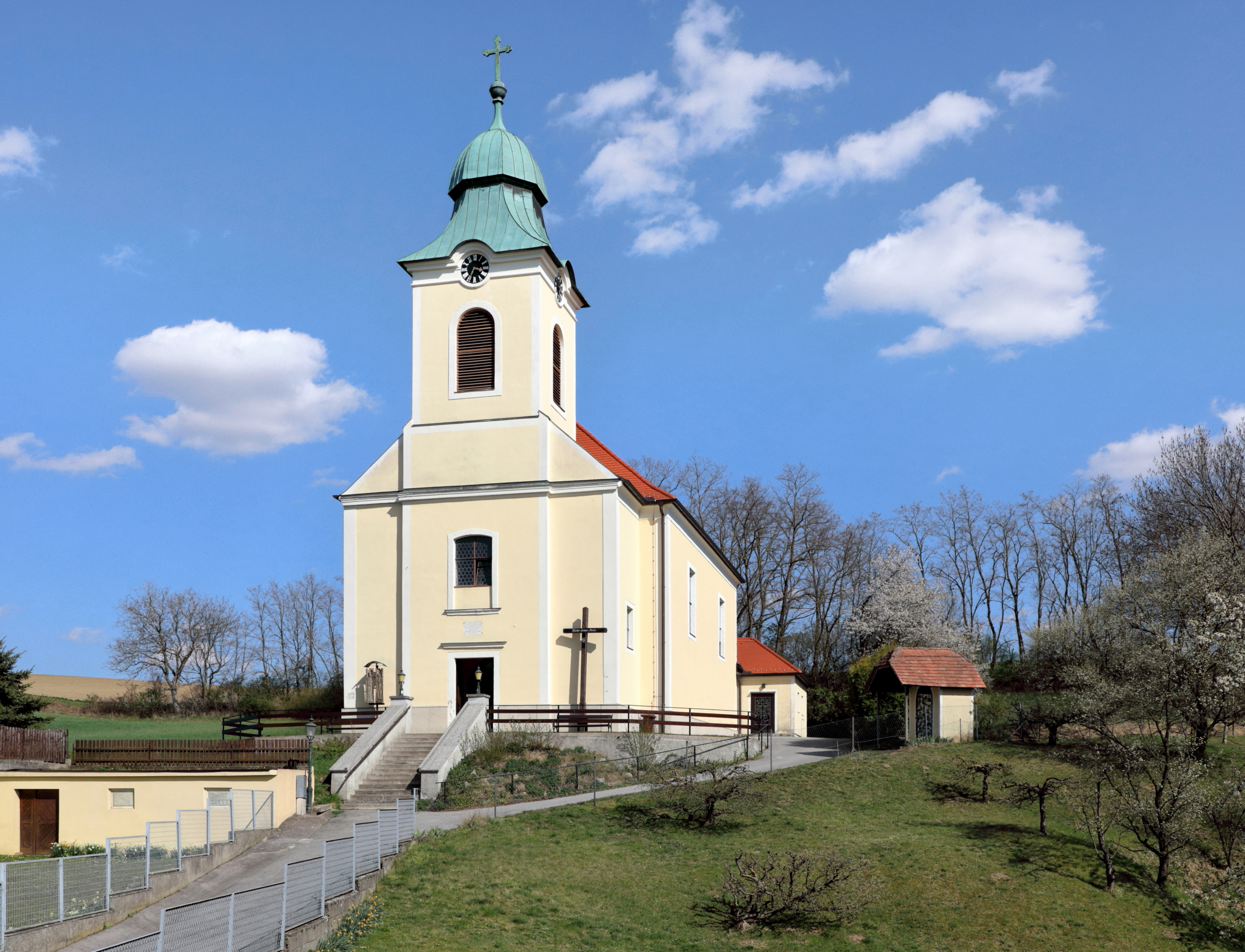
Parish church of Obergänserndorf

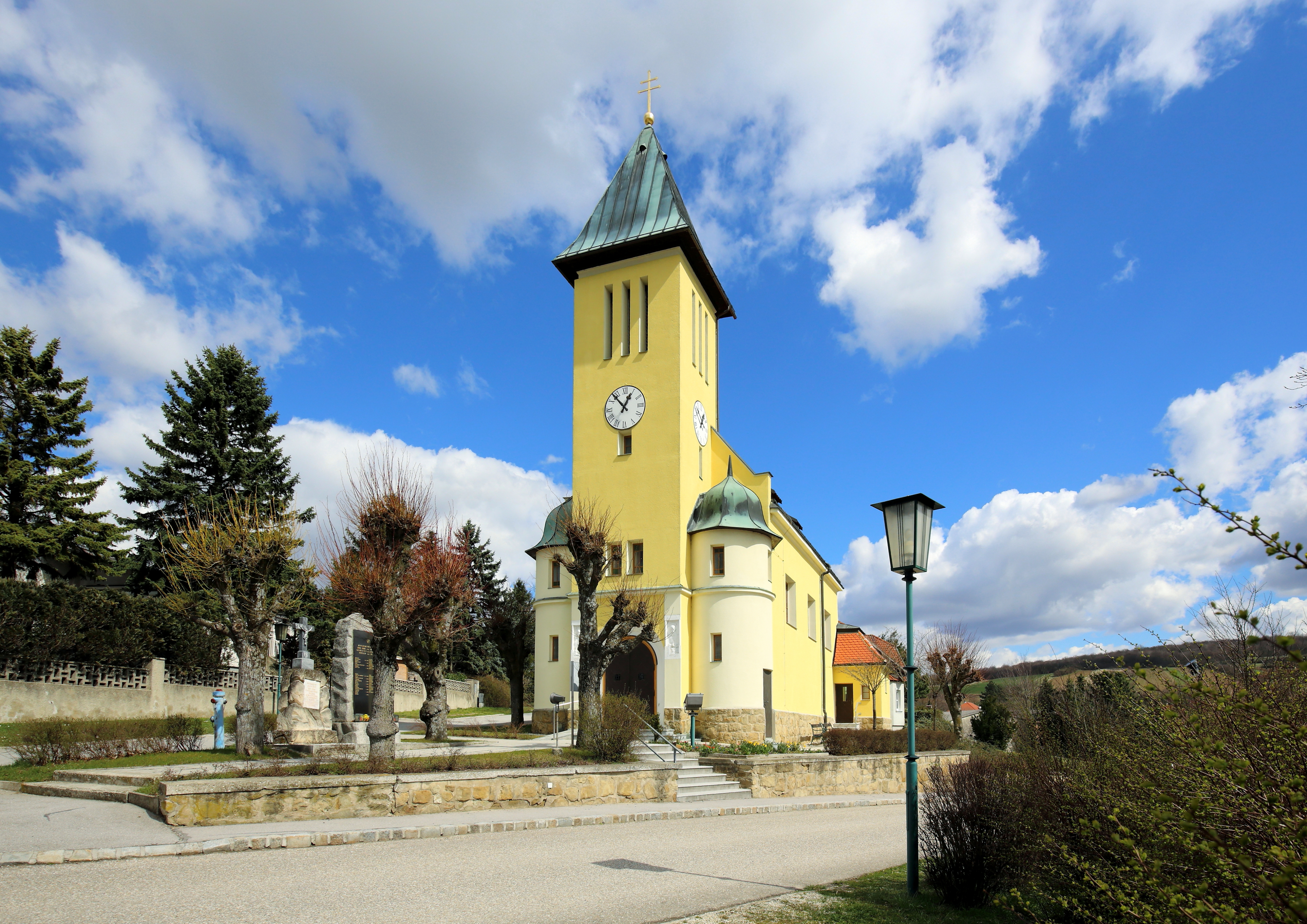
Branch church of Kleinrötz

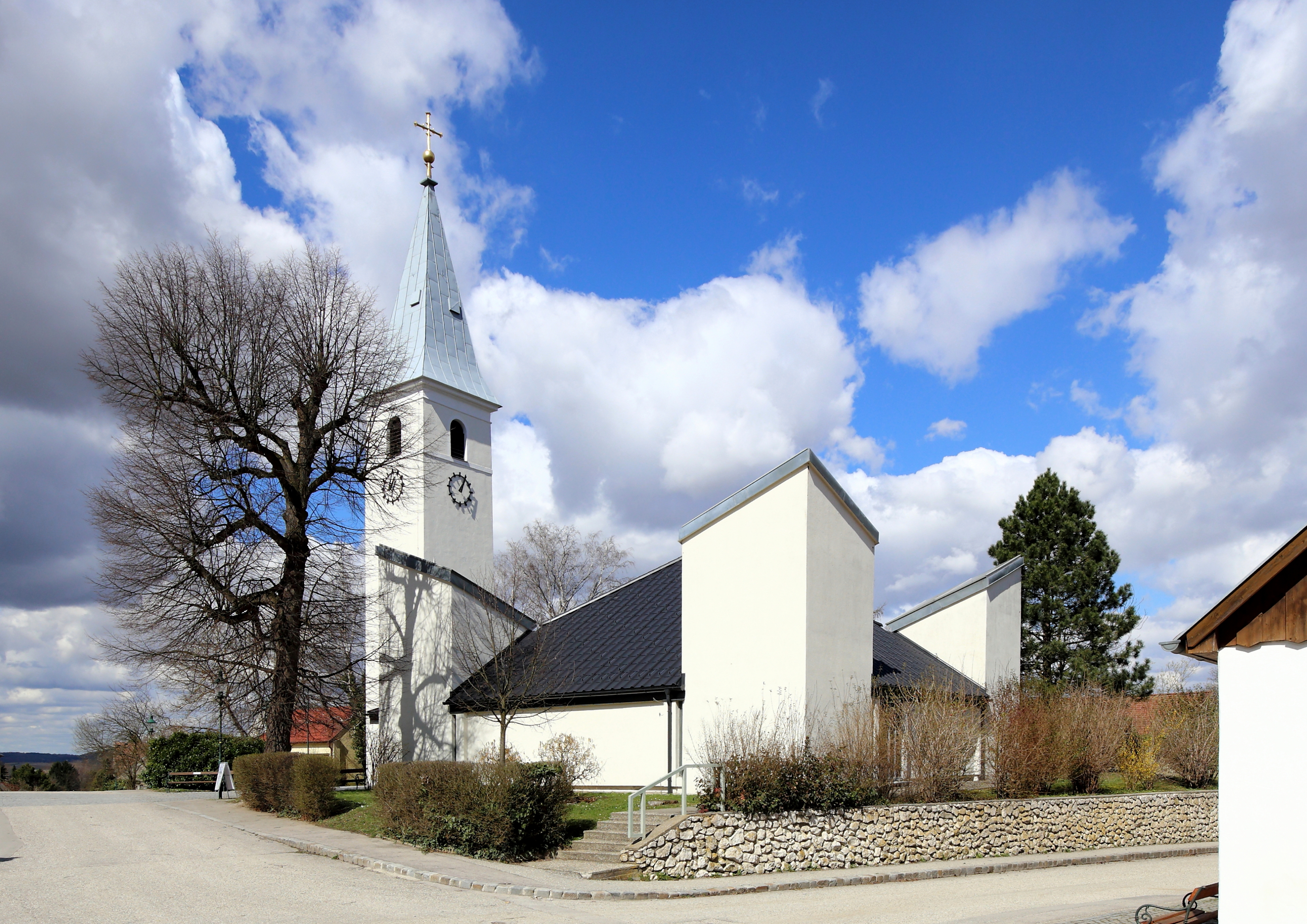
Parish church of Würnitz

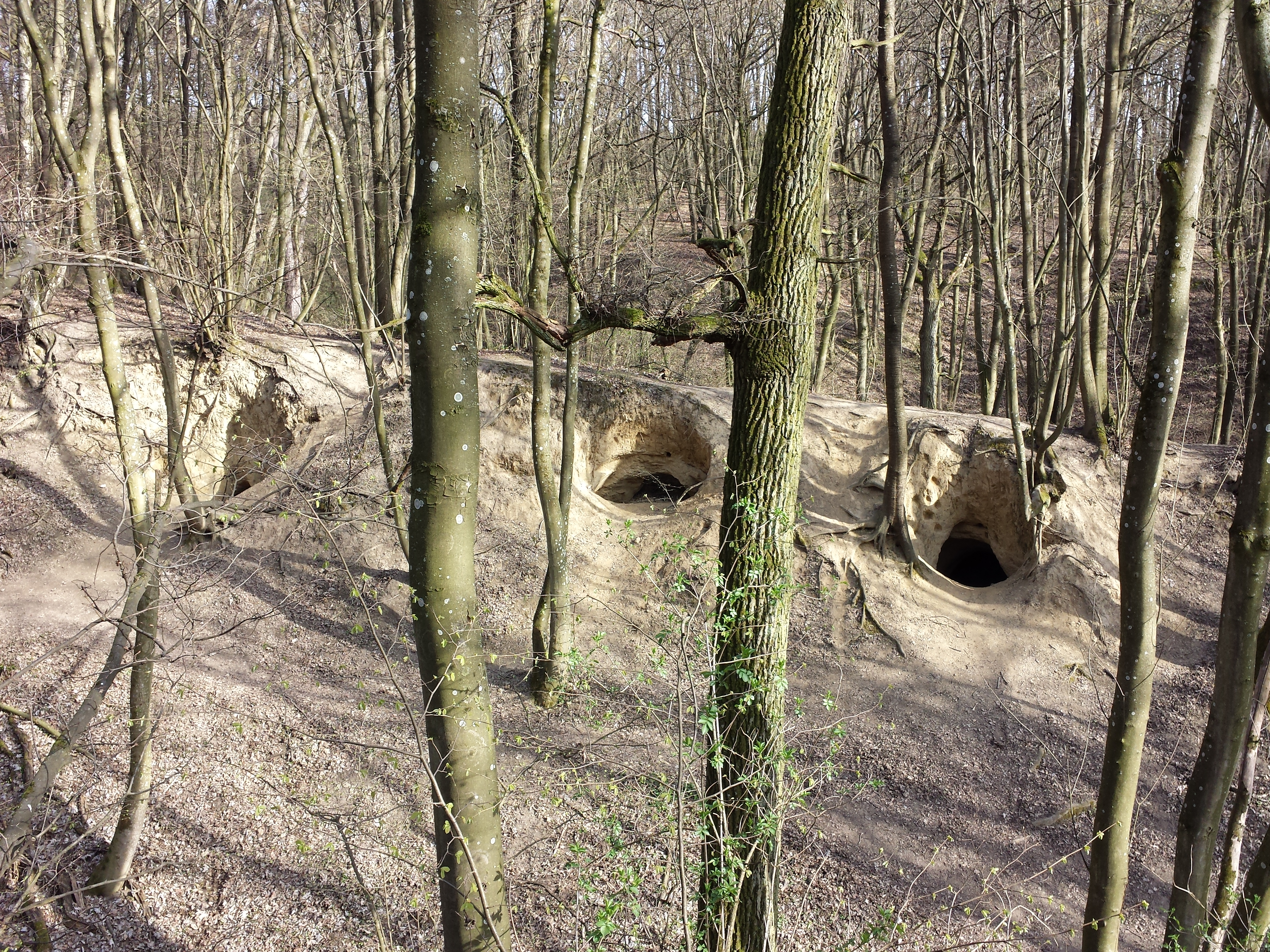
Schwedenhöhlen (Swedish Caves)
