= Johann Georg Lickl =

Austrian composer, organist, Kapellmeister & piano teacher (1769–1843)

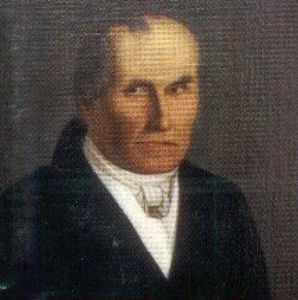
- Lickl, in an undated portrait
- Born: 11 April 1769; Korneuburg, Lower Austria, Austria
- Died: 12 May 1843 (aged 74); Fünfkirchen, Royal Hungary, Imperial Austria
- Other names: Ligkl; Hans-Georg Lickl
- Occupations: Organist; composer; Kapellmeister; piano teacher
- Years active: 1780s–1843
- Style: Classical; chamber
- Children: 2

Johann Georg Lickl (Hungarian: Lickl György; 11 April 1769 – 12 May 1843), also Ligkl or Hans-Georg Lickl, was an Austrian organist, composer, Kapellmeister in the main church of Pécs, and piano teacher.

== Biography ==
Lickl was born in Korneuburg, Lower Austria, and orphaned as a child. He studied under Witzig, who was the organist at the church of Korneuburg.

He relocated to Vienna in 1785 and studied under Johann Georg Albrechtsberger and Joseph Haydn. He also formed a close friendship with Wolfgang Amadeus Mozart, whom he also took lessons from. Later in the 1780s, he became organist at the Carmelite church in Leopoldstadt. He collaborated with Emanuel Schikaneder on a number of Singspiele in the 1790s, working in the Theater auf der Wieden. He died, aged 74, in Fünfkirchen (Hungarian: Pécs), southern Royal Hungary, Imperial Austria.

He wrote operas, one wind quintet, three string quartets, and served as a Kapellmeister at several churches. From 1807 until his death, he was choirmaster at what is now Pécs.

A large portion of his output is sacred music, including masses and requiems.

In 1843, some of his piano and chamber music works were published by Tobias Haslinger (Vienna), Johann Anton André (Offenbach) and Johann Carl Gombart (Augsburg).

His sons, Karl Georg Lickl (1801, Vienna – 1877, Vienna) and Ägid (Ägidius Ferdinand) Karl Lickl (1803, Vienna – 1864, Trieste), were also composers, whose output includes works for piano and for physharmonica, including a transcription of Beethoven's Mass in C major for physharmonica and piano.

== See also ==
- Music of Pécs
- Diocese of Pécs
