= Abolla (Sicily) =

Coordinates: 36.909900°N 15.134300°E

Abolla (Ancient Greek: Ἄβολλα), was a city of Sicily, mentioned only by Stephanus Byzantinus, who affords no clue to its position, but it has been supposed, on account of the resemblance of the name, to have occupied the site of Avola, between Syracuse and Noto. A coin of this city has been published by Jacques Philippe d'Orville (Sicula, pt. ii. tab. 20), but is of very uncertain authority. (Eckhel, vol. i. p. 189; Castell., Sicil. Vet. Num. p. 4.)
