= Stetten =

Stetten may refer to the following places:

== Germany ==
- Stetten (Achstetten), Baden-Württemberg
- Stetten am kalten Markt, Baden-Württemberg
- Stetten, Bodenseekreis, Baden-Württemberg
- Stetten, Lörrach, Baden-Württemberg
- Kernen, formerly Stetten im Remstal and Rommelshausen, Baden-Württemberg
- Stetten, Bavaria
- Stetten, Sondheim vor der Rhön, Bavaria
- Stetten, Rhineland-Palatinate

== Austria ==
- Stetten, Austria

== France ==
- Stetten, Haut-Rhin, a commune in Haut-Rhin

== Switzerland ==
- Stetten, Aargau
- Stetten, Schaffhausen
