= Hagenbrunn =

- Municipality
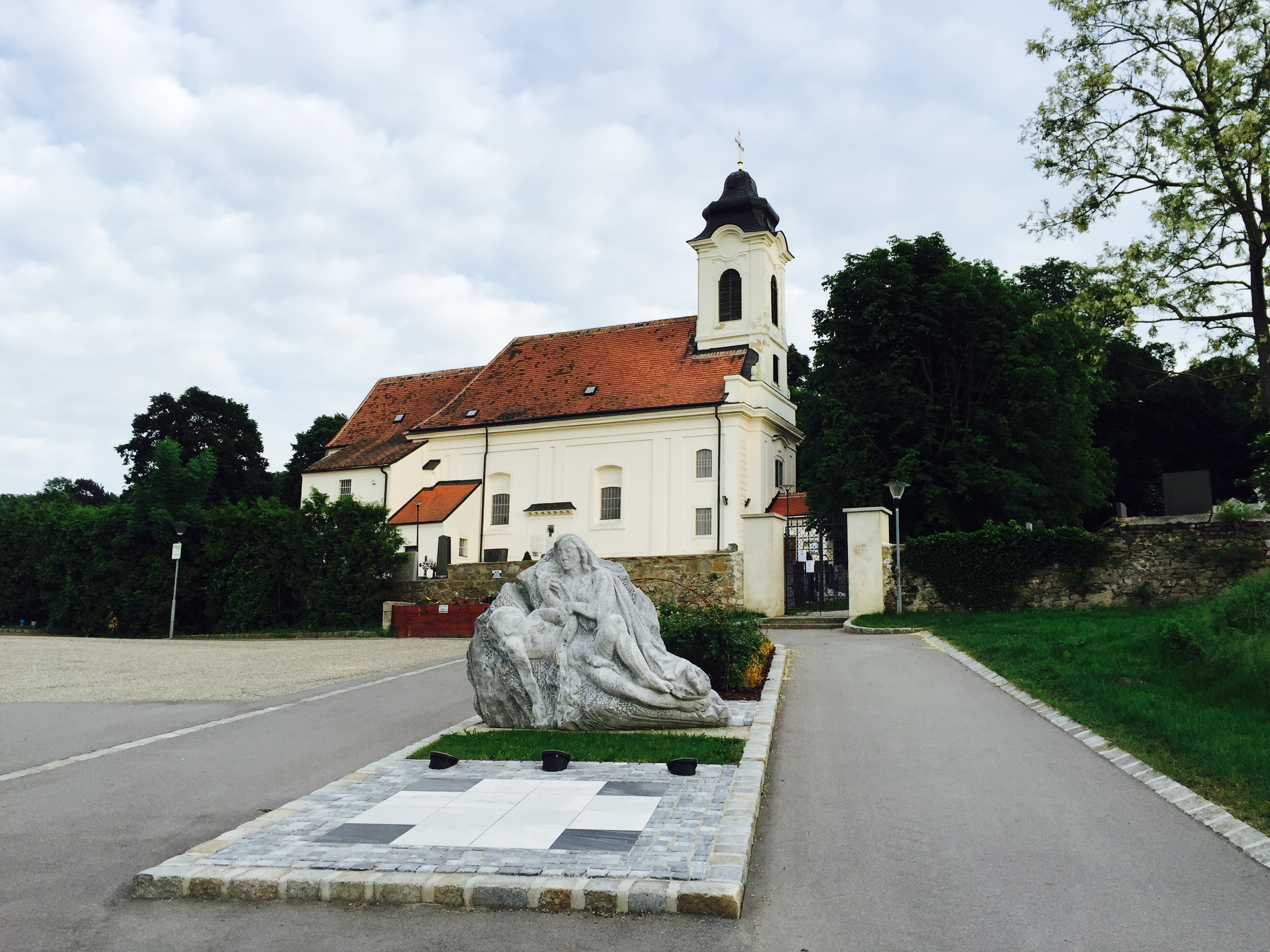
- Hagenbrunn parish church

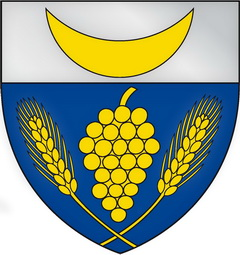
- Coat of arms

- Location within Austria
- Coordinates: 48°20′N 16°24′E
- Country: Austria
- State: Lower Austria
- District: Korneuburg

Government
  - Mayor: Michael Oberschil

Area
  - Total: 13.49 km^{2} (5.21 sq mi)
- Elevation: 216 m (709 ft)

Population (2018-01-01)
  - Total: 2,227
  - Density: 165.1/km^{2} (427.6/sq mi)
- Time zone: UTC+1 (CET)
  - Summer (DST): UTC+2 (CEST)
- Postal code: 2102
- Area code: 02262
- Website: www.hagenbrunn.at

Hagenbrunn is a town in the district of Korneuburg in Lower Austria in Austria.

== Geography ==
It lies north of Bisamberg in the Weinviertel in Lower Austria. About 4.41 percent of the municipality is forested.
