= Enzersfeld im Weinviertel =

- Municipality
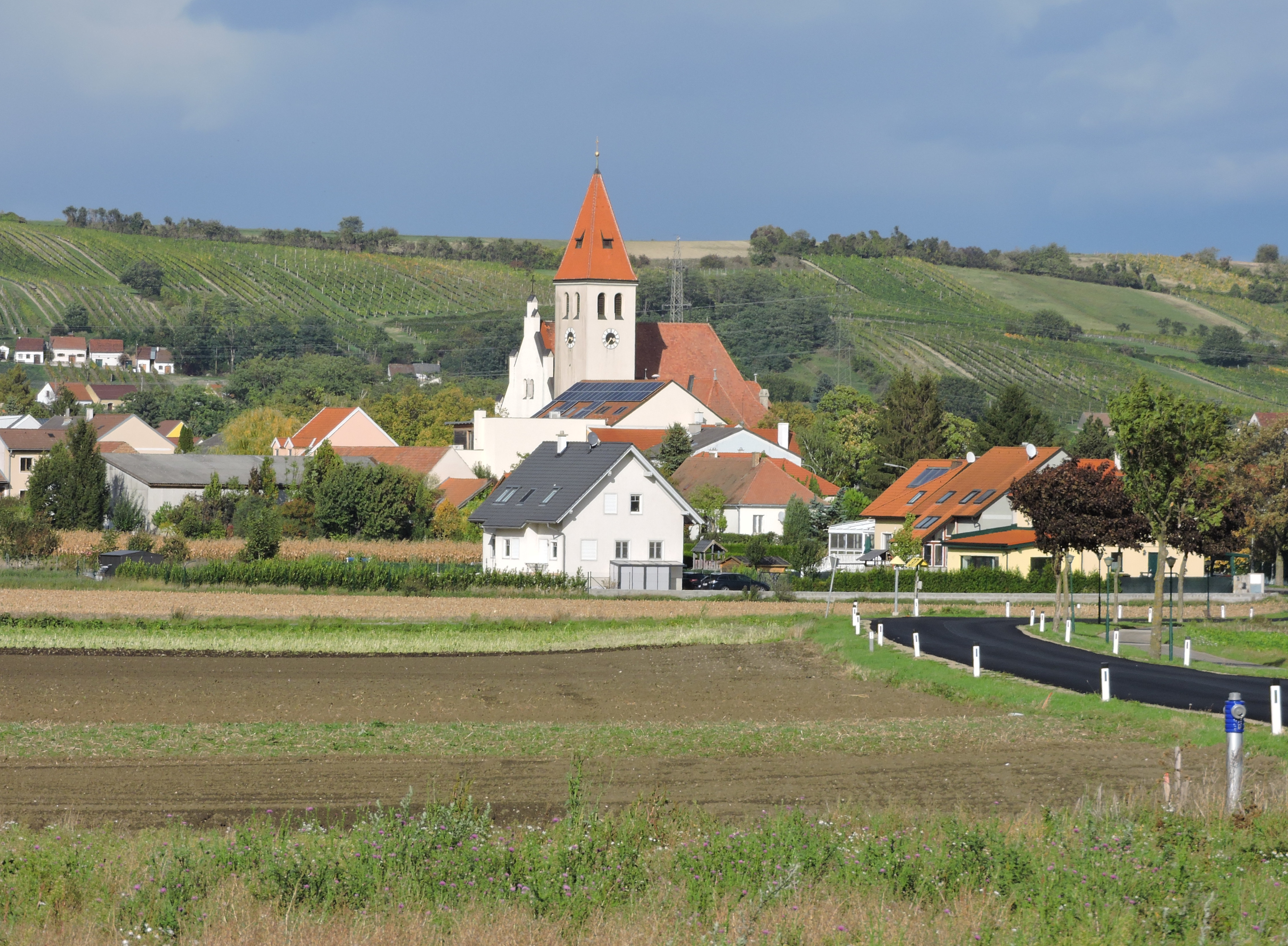
- View of Enzersfeld

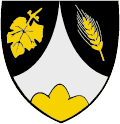
- Coat of arms

- Location within Austria
- Coordinates: 48°22′N 16°26′E
- Country: Austria
- State: Lower Austria
- District: Korneuburg

Government
  - Mayor: Josef Schiel

Area
  - Total: 9.86 km^{2} (3.81 sq mi)
- Elevation: 186 m (610 ft)

Population (2018-01-01)
  - Total: 1,713
  - Density: 174/km^{2} (450/sq mi)
- Time zone: UTC+1 (CET)
  - Summer (DST): UTC+2 (CEST)
- Postal code: 2202
- Area code: 02262
- Website: www.enzersfeld.at

Enzersfeld im Weinviertel is a town in the district of Korneuburg in the state of Lower Austria in Austria.

== Geography ==
Enzersfeld lies in the Weinviertel in Lower Austria east of Korneuburg. About 4 percent of the municipality is forested.
