= Großmugl =

- Municipality
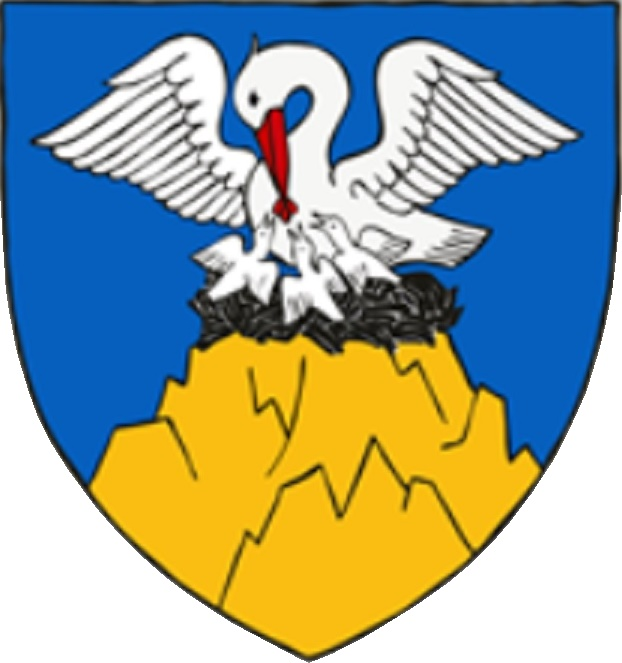
- Coat of arms

- Location within Austria
- Coordinates: 48°31′N 16°15′E
- Country: Austria
- State: Lower Austria
- District: Korneuburg

Government
  - Mayor: Karl Lehner

Area
  - Total: 64.49 km^{2} (24.90 sq mi)
- Elevation: 217 m (712 ft)

Population (2018-01-01)
  - Total: 1,595
  - Density: 24.73/km^{2} (64.06/sq mi)
- Time zone: UTC+1 (CET)
  - Summer (DST): UTC+2 (CEST)
- Postal code: 2002
- Area code: 02268
- Website: www.grossmugl.gv.at

Großmugl is a town in the district of Korneuburg in Lower Austria in Austria. It is situated about 15 km north of Stockerau within the Weinviertel in Lower Austria. Großmugl takes up about 64.49 square kilometers, 29.91 percent of which are forest.

== The giant tumulus ==
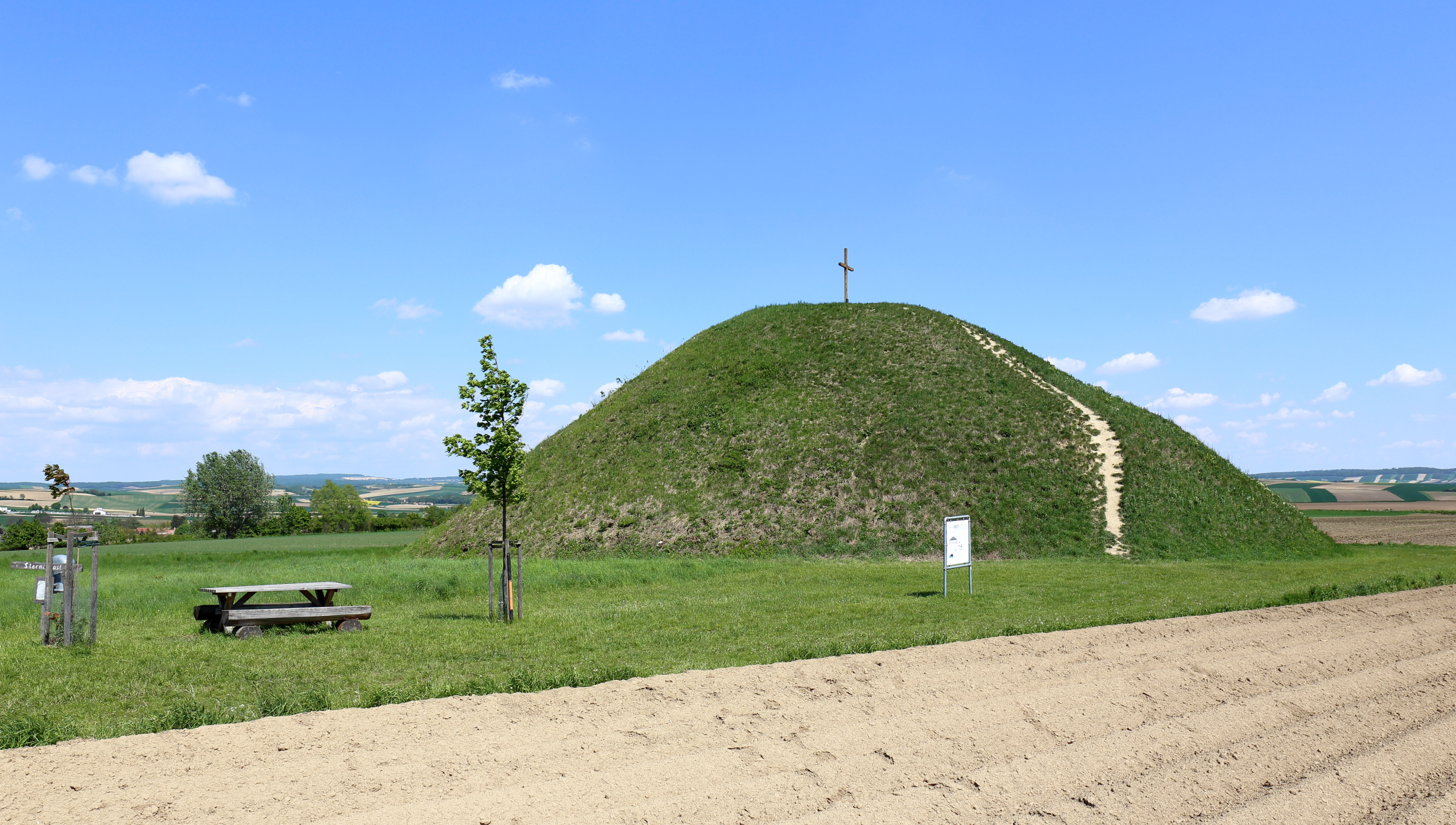
The Leeberg, an Iron Age burial mound, rises from the fields near Großmugl

The name of the village literally translates as "large steep hill," and refers to a nearby tumulus (locally known as the Leeberg) that is believed to have been erected by the people of the Kalenderberg culture, probably around 600-500 B.C. This was a northeastern subgroup of the Hallstatt culture, with a standard of living generally somewhat poorer than the other coexisting subgroups of the eastern Hallstatt cultural area. The geographic position of the Leeberg is 48° 29.34'N/16°13.45'E.

With 55 metres (180 ft) diameter and 16 metres (52 ft) height remaining, the Leeberg is the largest hill grave in Central Europe. Taking erosion into account, its original size can be estimated at 18–20 metres (59–66 ft) height and a base diameter of about 70 metres (230 ft). Because of its unusual size it has apparently defied graverobbers and also the more recent efforts of "amateur archeologists." Although it is beyond doubt that this huge tumulus must be a powerful local chieftain's burial place, no serious attempt at scientific investigation of the Leeberg has been made either.

Großmugl opened a permanent star walk installation designated for astronomical observations with the unaided eye. The Großmugl Star Walk was designed by Project Nightflight and built in close collaboration with the municipality of Großmugl.
