= Joseph Hilarius Eckhel =

Austrian Jesuit priest and numismatist (1737–1798)

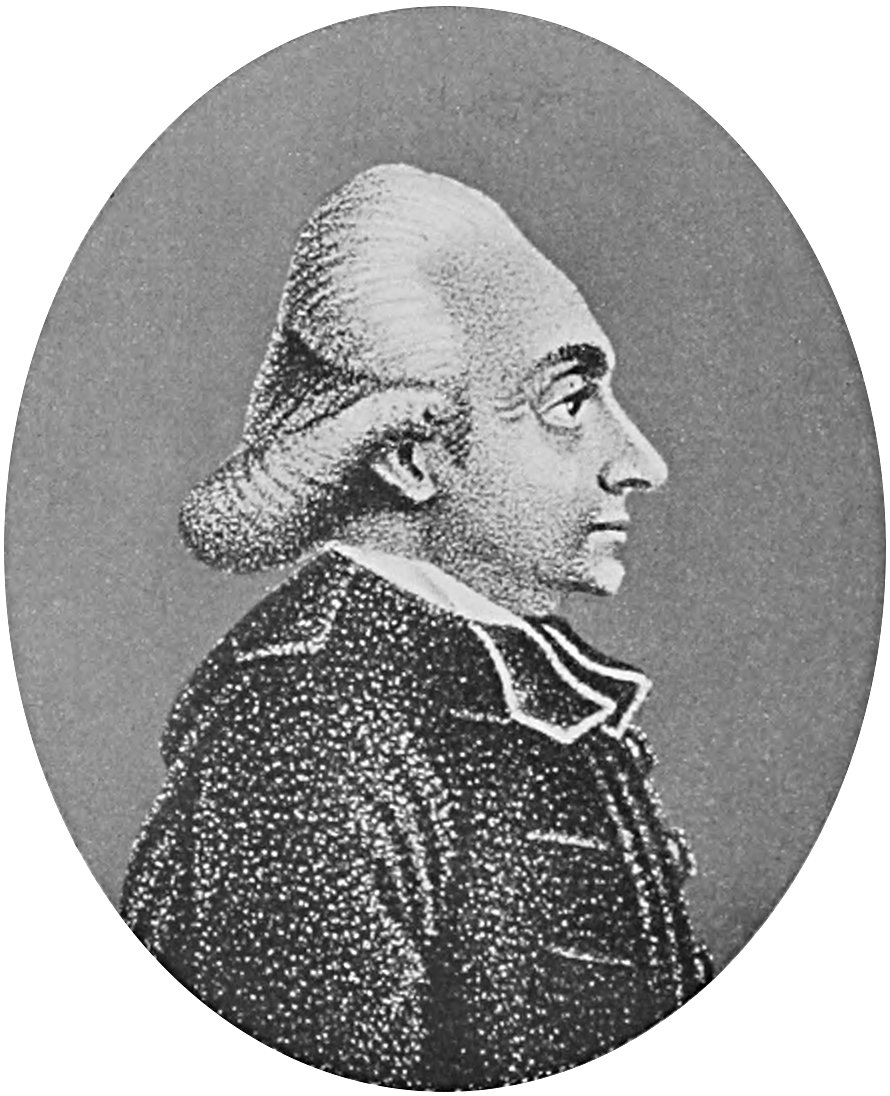
Joseph Hilarius Eckhel

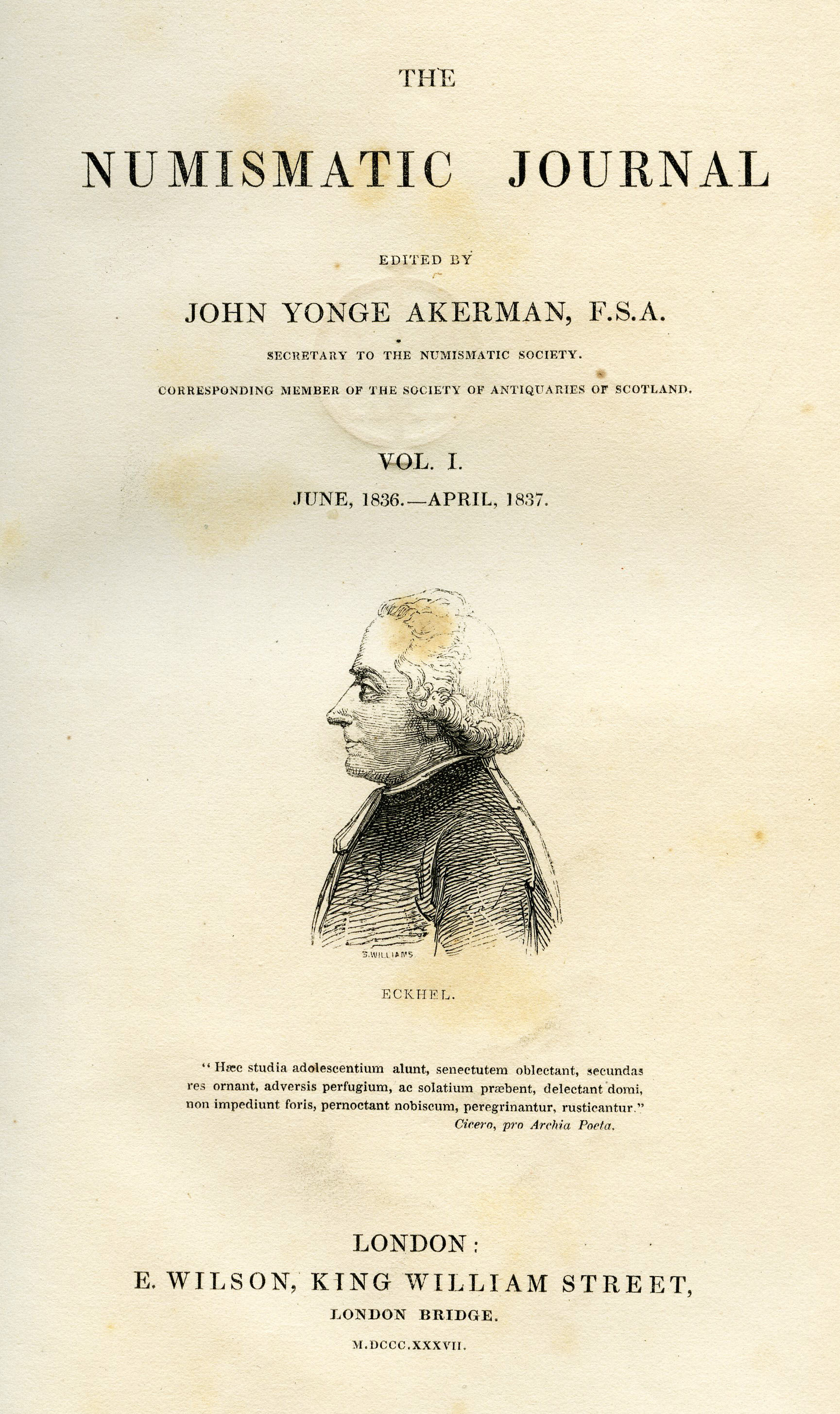
Engraving of Eckhel by Samuel Williams on the first front page of The Numismatic Journal, about 1837

Joseph Hilarius Eckhel (13 January 1737 – 16 May 1798) was an Austrian Jesuit priest and numismatist.

== Biography ==
Eckhel was born at Enzersfeld, in Lower Austria. His father was farm-steward to Count Zinzendorf, and he received his early education at the Jesuit College in Vienna, where, at the age of fourteen, he was admitted into that order. He devoted himself to antiquities and numismatics. After being engaged as professor of poetry and rhetoric, first at Steyr and afterwards at Vienna, he was appointed in 1772 as keeper of the cabinet of coins at the Jesuits' College, and in the same year he went to Italy for the purpose of personal inspection and study of antiquities and coins.

At Florence, he was employed to arrange the collection of the grand duke of Tuscany; and the first-fruits of his study of this and other collections appeared in his Numi veteres anecdoti, published in 1775. Upon the suppression of the Society of Jesus in 1773, Eckhel was appointed by the empress Maria Theresa of Austria professor of antiquities and numismatics at the University of Vienna, and this post he held for twenty-four years. He was in the following year made keeper of the imperial cabinet of coins, and in 1779 appeared his Catalogus Vindobonensis numorum veterum. His main work is the Doctrina numorum veterum, in 8 vols, the first of which was published in 1792, and the last in 1798.

According to the 1911 edition of the Encyclopædia Britannica:

The author's rich learning, comprehensive grasp of his subject, admirable order and precision of statement in this masterpiece drew from C. G. Heyne enthusiastic praise, and the acknowledgment that Eckhel, as the Coryphaeus of numismatists, had, out of the mass of previously loose and confused facts, constituted a true science.

A volume of Addenda, prepared by Steinbuchel from Eckhel's papers after his death, was published in 1826.

== Works ==
Among his other works are:

- Choix de pierres gravées du Cabinet Imperial des Antiques (1788)
- A school-book on coins entitled Kurzgefasste Anfangsgrunde zur alten Numismatik (1787)
- Doctrina Numorum Veterum. 8 vols. Degen et al., Vienna 1792–1798;
  - Part 1: De Numis Urbium, Populorum, Regum. Vol. 1: Continens Prolegomena Generalia, tum Numos Hispaniae, Galliae, Britanniae, Germaniae, Italiae, cum Insulis. Degen, Wien 1792 (Open Access urn:nbn:se:alvin:portal:record-339075);
  - Part 1: De Numis Urbium, Populorum, Regum. Vol. 2: Reliquas Europae Regiones cum Parte Asiae Minoris. Degen, Wien 1792 (Open Access urn:nbn:se:alvin:portal:record-339018);
  - Part 1: De Numis Urbium, Populorum, Regum. Vol. 3: Reliquam Asiam Minorem, et Regiones deinceps in Ortum sitas. Degen, Wien 1794 (Open Access urn:nbn:se:alvin:portal:record-339342);
  - Part 1: De Numis Urbium, Populorum, Regum. Vol. 4: Continens Aegyptum, et Regiones Africae deinceps in occasum sitas. Observata Generalia ad partem I. huius Operis, et Indices in Partem I. Camesina, Wien 1794 (Open Access urn:nbn:se:alvin:portal:record-339013);
  - Part 2: De Moneta Romanorum. Vol. 5: Continens Numos Consulares et Familiarum subiectis Indicibus. Camesina, Wien 1795 (Open Access urn:nbn:se:alvin:portal:record-339004);
  - Part 2: De Moneta Romanorum. Vol. 6: Continens Numos Imperatorios a Iulio Caesare usque ad Hadrianum eiusque Familiam. Camesina, Wien 1796 (Open Access urn:nbn:se:alvin:portal:record-339040);
  - Part 2: De Moneta Romanorum. Vol. 7: Continens Numos Imperatorios ab Antonio Pio usque ad Imperium Diocletiani. Camesina, Wien 1797 (Open Access urn:nbn:se:alvin:portal:record-339054);
  - Part 2: De Moneta Romanorum. Vol. 8: Continens Numos Imperatorios, qui supersunt, pseudomonetam, Observata Generalia in Partem II et Indices in Volumina VI VII VIII. Camesina, Wien 1798 (Open Access urn:nbn:se:alvin:portal:record-339044).

== See also ==
- Joseph Pellerin
