= Sierndorf =

- Municipality
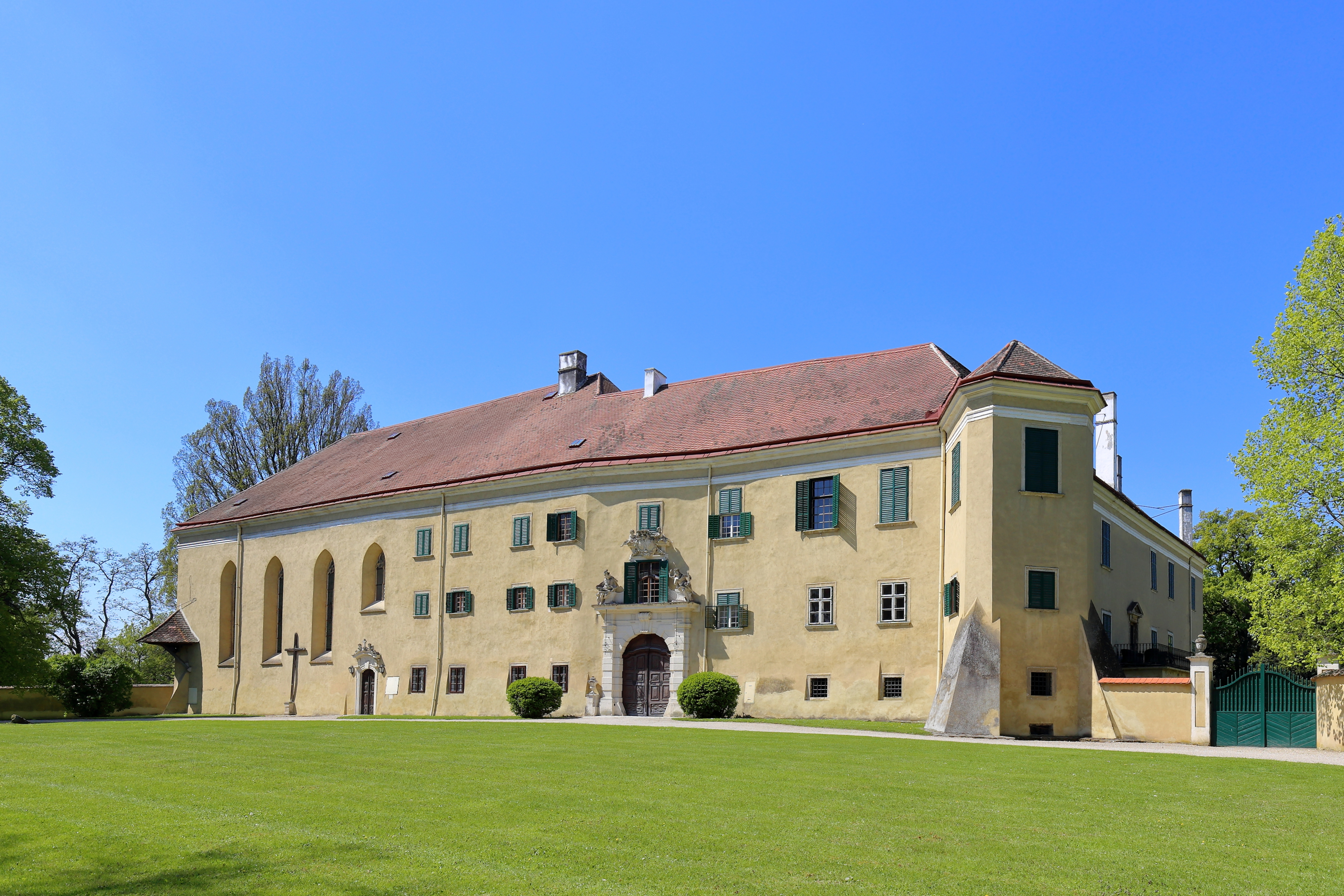
- Sierndorf Castle

- Coat of arms

- Location within Austria
- Coordinates: 48°26′N 16°10′E
- Country: Austria
- State: Lower Austria
- District: Korneuburg

Government
  - Mayor: Gottfried Muck (ÖVP)

Area
  - Total: 55.08 km^{2} (21.27 sq mi)
- Elevation: 191 m (627 ft)

Population (2018-01-01)
  - Total: 3,933
  - Density: 71.41/km^{2} (184.9/sq mi)
- Time zone: UTC+1 (CET)
  - Summer (DST): UTC+2 (CEST)
- Postal code: 2011
- Area code: 02267
- Website: www.sierndorf.at

Sierndorf is a town in the district of Korneuburg in the Austrian state of Lower Austria.

== Population ==
Historical population
Year	Pop.	±%
1869	2,639	—
1880	2,805	+6.3%
1890	3,137	+11.8%
1900	3,139	+0.1%
1910	3,033	−3.4%
1923	2,995	−1.3%
1934	2,876	−4.0%
1939	3,021	+5.0%
1951	2,735	−9.5%
1961	2,502	−8.5%
1971	2,413	−3.6%
1981	2,589	+7.3%
1991	2,786	+7.6%
2001	3,132	+12.4%
2011	3,634	+16.0%
2021	3,986	+9.7%
