= Edith Hörandner =

Edith Hörandner (née Klenk) (1939 – 2008) was an Austrian folklorist and educator. On receiving her doctorate from the Folklore Institute at the University of Vienna, she worked as a researcher at the Gesellschaft für den Volkskundeatlas in Österreich on the Austrian Folklore Atlas (1966–68). From 1968 to 1986 she was a research assistant at the Vienna Folklore Institute, after which she was appointed Professor of Folklore at the University of Graz until her retirement in 2007. Her work included research into folk medicine, food, costumes, and beliefs and superstitions. She later devoted attention in her teaching and publications to ageing, the everyday life of children and Halloween.

== Early life and family ==
Born on 12 February 1939 in Korneuburg, Edith Klenk was the daughter of the gendarmerie officer Anton Klenk and his wife Anna. On graduating from high school in 1957, she studied philosophy, German and English at the University of Vienna, including a semester at the University of Boston (1958/59). When the Folklore Institute was opened in Vienna in 1963, she adapted her studies to folklore and English. With a dissertation titled Terminologie, Methoden und Zielsetzungen einer Wiener Volkskunde in Verbindung mit Darstellung und Einordnung zweier erneuerter gegenwärtiger Brauchformen (Terminology, Methods and Objectives of Focus on Viennese Folklore with a Presentation and Classification of Two Revived Customs), she earned a doctorate in July 1966. In 1972, she married the Byzantinist Wolfram Hörander with whom she had a daughter Magdalena (1973).

== Career ==
At the university, Klenk had been a student of Richard Wolfram who encouraged her to join him at the Gesellschaft für den Volkskundeatlas in Österreich where she worked on the Österreichischer Volkskundeatlas (ÔVA, Austrian Folklore Atlas) from 1966 to 1968. She was then employed as a research assistant at the University of Vienna's Folklore Institute. After her marriage, Hörandner spent a period as a freelancer at the Austrian Broadcasting Corporation. In 1986, she was appointed Professor of Folklore at the University of Graz.

While with the ÔVA, she investigated traditional food and eating customs. Her later research dealt with noise, sowing and harvesting and Christmas. From 1976, she coordinated work on traditions in pre-industrial Europe for the preservation of meat, bacon and sausages. She is also remembered for her work on superstitions and beliefs, the everyday life of children, ageing and the Celtic origins of Halloween. In 1982, she published Model. Geschnitzte Formen für Lebkuchen, Spekulatius und Springerle (Model. Carved shapes for Lebkuchen, Speculoos and Springerle). One of her most significant achievements was her work from 1988 on the Graz contribution to European Ethnology (Grazer Beiträge zur Europäischen Ethnologie).

Edith Hörandner retired from the University of Graz in 2007 and died in Graz just nine months later on 20 June 2008.
