= Fritz Cejka =

Austrian footballer (1928–2020)

Personal information
- Full name: Friedrich Cejka
- Date of birth: 3 July 1928
- Place of birth: Korneuburg, Austria
- Date of death: 26 November 2020 (aged 92)
- Position: Forward

Senior career*
Years	Team	Apps	(Gls)
1947–1959	Admira Wien	270	(125)
1959–1963	Wiener AC	100	(83)
1963–1964	Kapfenberger SV	22	(14)
1964–1966	First Vienna FC	46	(23)

International career
1952	Austria	1	(1)
- * Club domestic league appearances and goals

Friedrich 'Fritz' Cejka (3 July 1928 – 26 November 2020) was an Austrian football forward who played for Austria. He also played for Admira Wien, Wiener AC, Kapfenberger SV and First Vienna FC.
