= Rußbach =

- Municipality
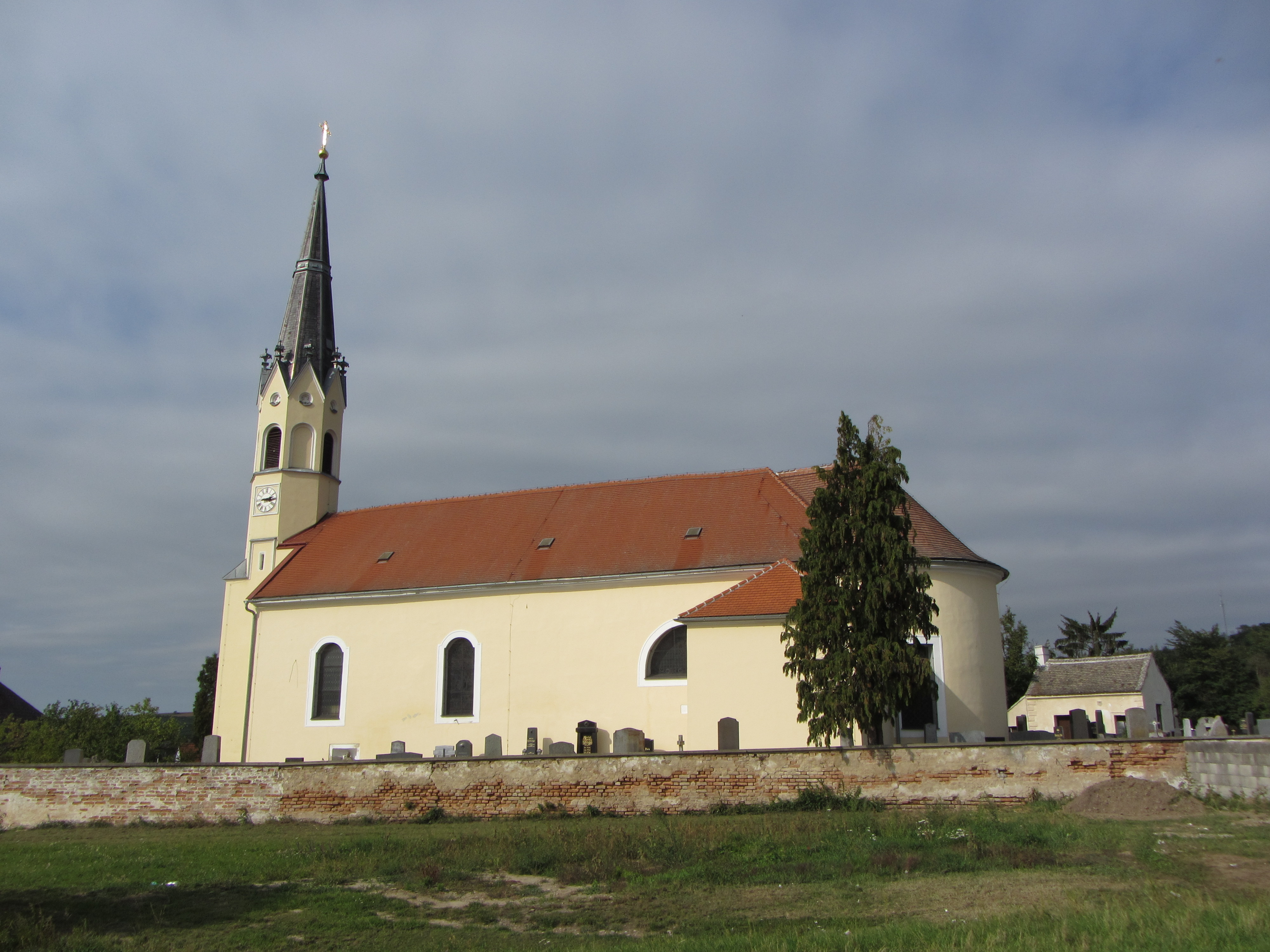
- Niederrußbach parish church

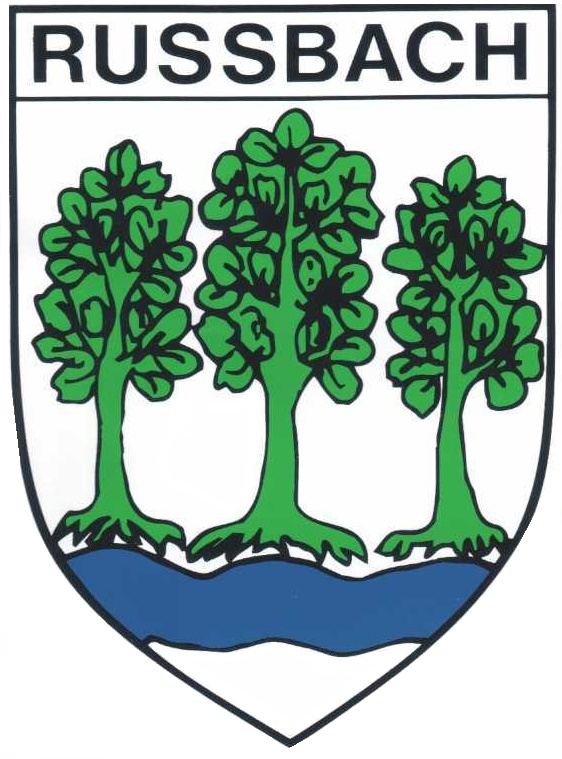
- Coat of arms

- Location within Austria
- Coordinates: 48°27′N 16°2′E
- Country: Austria
- State: Lower Austria
- District: Korneuburg

Government
  - Mayor: Anton Pfeifer

Area
  - Total: 30.65 km^{2} (11.83 sq mi)
- Elevation: 247 m (810 ft)

Population (2018-01-01)
  - Total: 1,424
  - Density: 46.46/km^{2} (120.3/sq mi)
- Time zone: UTC+1 (CET)
  - Summer (DST): UTC+2 (CEST)
- Postal code: 3702
- Area code: 02955

Rußbach is a town in the district of Korneuburg in the Austrian state of Lower Austria.

== Population ==
Historical population
Year	Pop.	±%
1869	1,690	—
1880	1,747	+3.4%
1890	1,792	+2.6%
1900	1,735	−3.2%
1910	1,662	−4.2%
1923	1,637	−1.5%
1934	1,620	−1.0%
1939	1,539	−5.0%
1951	1,478	−4.0%
1961	1,292	−12.6%
1971	1,264	−2.2%
1981	1,674	+32.4%
1991	1,214	−27.5%
2001	1,333	+9.8%
2011	1,400	+5.0%
