= Spillern =

- Municipality
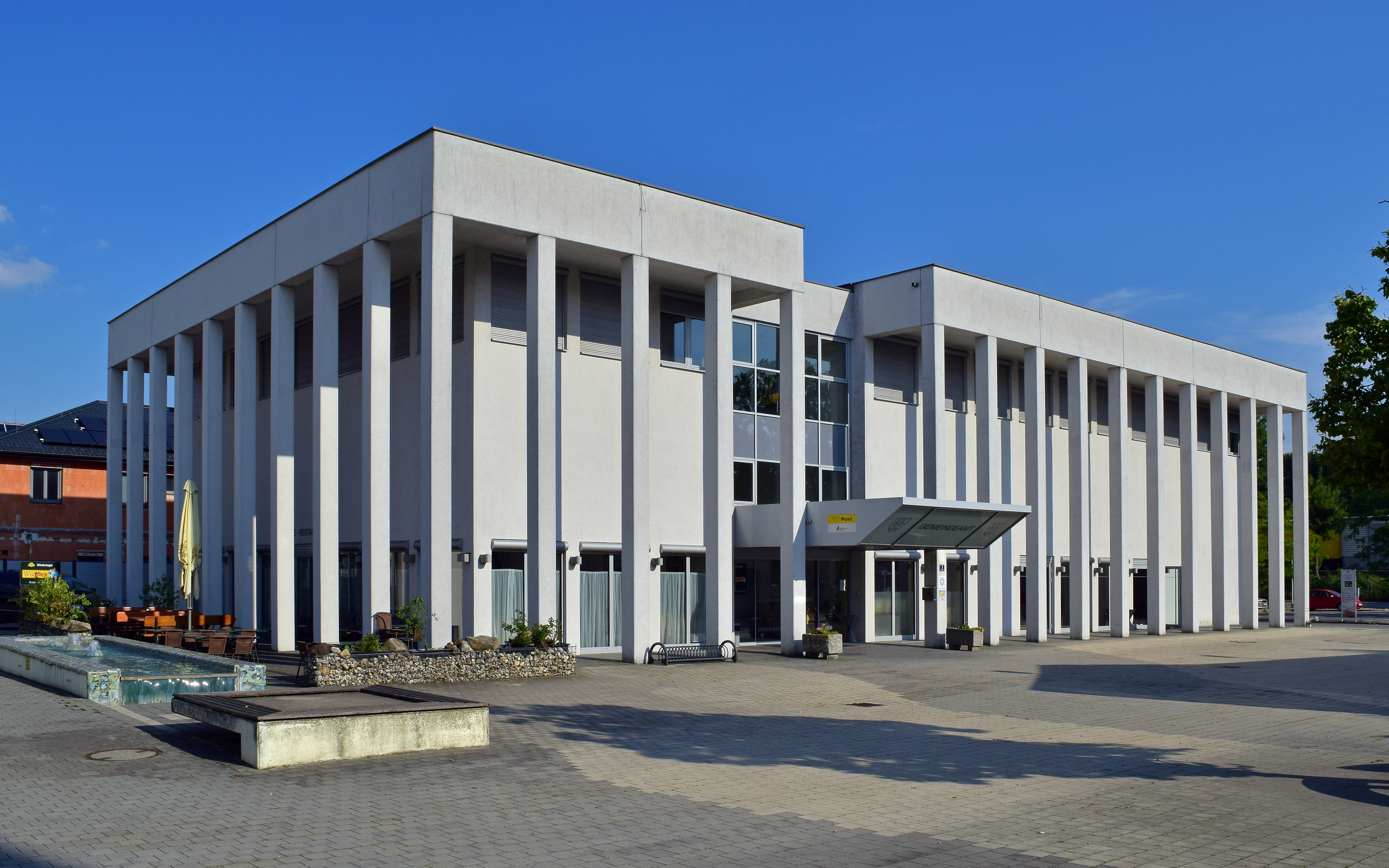
- Town hall and post office

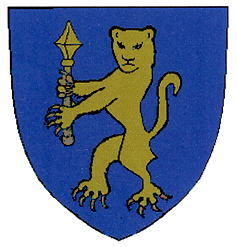
- Coat of arms

- Location within Austria
- Coordinates: 48°23′N 16°15′E
- Country: Austria
- State: Lower Austria
- District: Korneuburg

Government
  - Mayor: Ing. Thomas Speigner

Area
  - Total: 12.71 km^{2} (4.91 sq mi)
- Elevation: 170 m (560 ft)

Population (2018-01-01)
  - Total: 2,222
  - Density: 174.8/km^{2} (452.8/sq mi)
- Time zone: UTC+1 (CET)
  - Summer (DST): UTC+2 (CEST)
- Postal code: 2104
- Area code: 02266
- Website: www.spillern.at

Spillern is a town in the district of Korneuburg in the Austrian state of Lower Austria.

== Population ==
Historical population
Year	Pop.	±%
1971	1,210	—
1981	1,346	+11.2%
1991	1,506	+11.9%
2001	1,718	+14.1%
2011	2,083	+21.2%
2021	2,455	+17.9%
