= Stetten, Austria =

Stetten
- Municipality
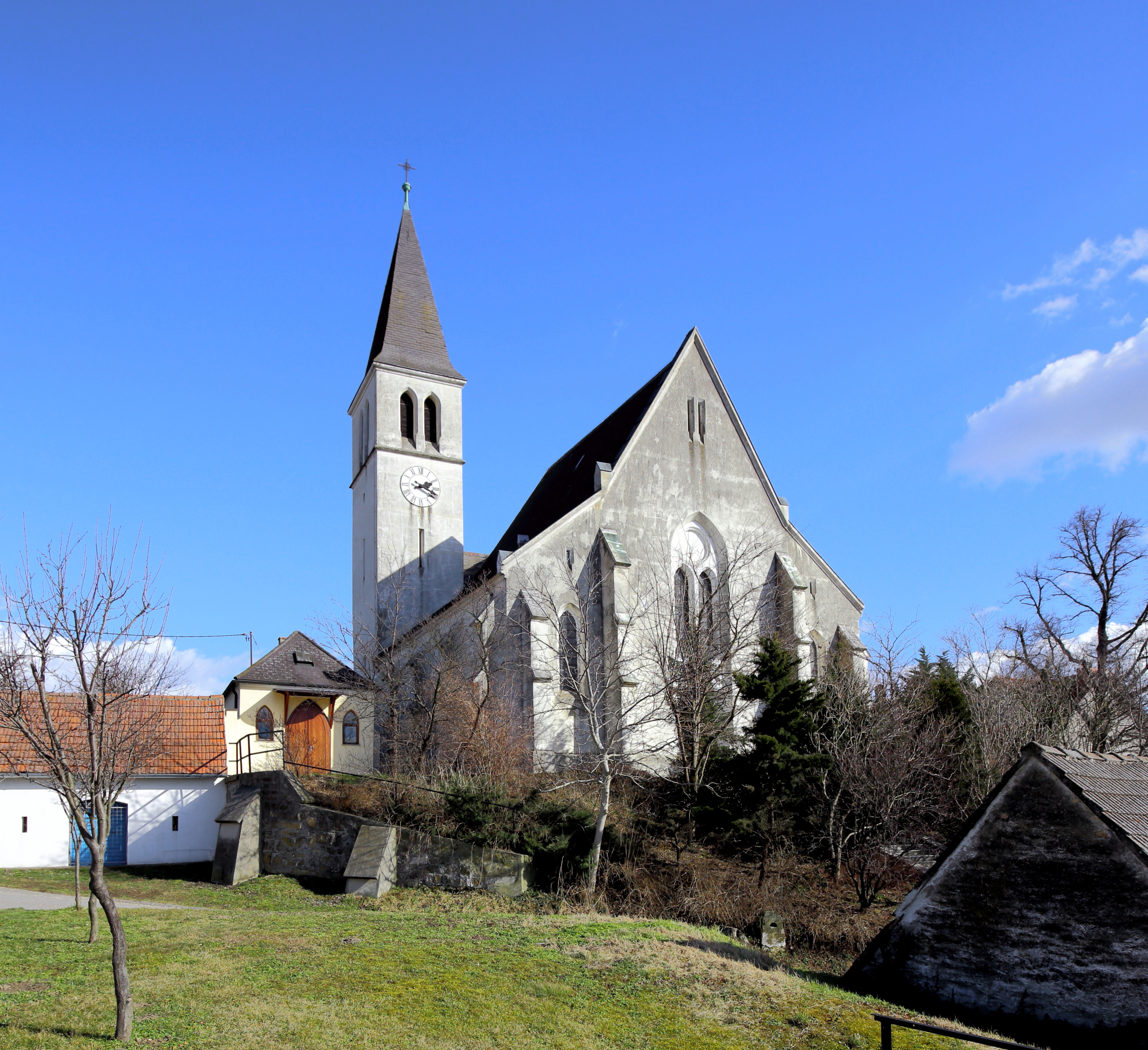
- Stetten parish church

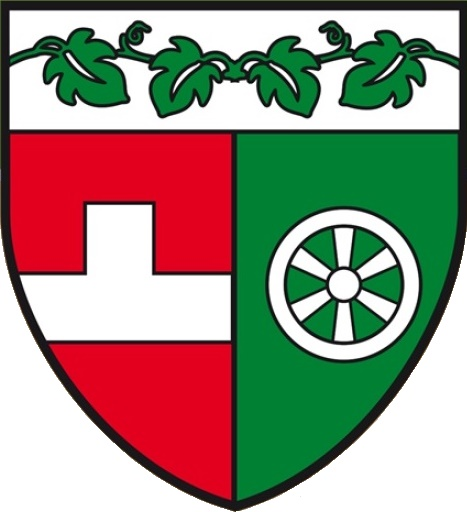
- Coat of arms

- Location within Austria
- Coordinates: 48°22′N 16°23′E
- Country: Austria
- State: Lower Austria
- District: Korneuburg

Government
  - Mayor: Leopold Ivan

Area
  - Total: 7.73 km^{2} (2.98 sq mi)
- Elevation: 180 m (590 ft)

Population (2018-01-01)
  - Total: 1,357
  - Density: 176/km^{2} (455/sq mi)
- Time zone: UTC+1 (CET)
  - Summer (DST): UTC+2 (CEST)
- Postal code: 2100
- Area code: 02262
- Website: www.stetten.at

Stetten (German pronunciation: [ˈʃtɛtn̩]) is a town in the district of Korneuburg in the Austrian state of Lower Austria.

== Population ==
Historical population
Year	Pop.	±%
1869	535	—
1880	577	+7.9%
1890	641	+11.1%
1900	790	+23.2%
1910	820	+3.8%
1923	916	+11.7%
1934	931	+1.6%
1939	891	−4.3%
1951	795	−10.8%
1961	851	+7.0%
1971	878	+3.2%
1981	886	+0.9%
1991	912	+2.9%
2001	1,065	+16.8%
2011	1,254	+17.7%
2021	1,362	+8.6%
