= Music of Pécs =

The Music of Pécs refers to the music from the city of Pécs.

Pécs is a major city in southwest Hungary that has long been a centre for music development in that country. The Symphony Orchestra of Pécs, recently renamed as Pannon Philharmonic Orchestra was founded in 1811. Its legal predecessor was the Musicians' Society (Tonkünstler Sozietät) founded by György Lickl (Johann Georg), a contemporary of Mozart and a disciple of Haydn, but the orchestra became a fully autonomous artistic institution in 1984, led by conductor and artistic director Tamás Breitner, and including 92 member artists. Other major conductors and directors of the city's orchestra include Nicolás Pasquet, Howard Williams, Zsolt Hamar and Tibor Boganyi (current conductor).

Pécs was European Capital of Culture in 2010 and a new concert-hall, the Kodaly Centre, was opened during that year.

At the 2006 World Choir Games organized in Xiamen, the Béla Bartók Male Choir from Pécs won the Olympic champion title ahead of the several hundred choirs from 82 countries competing at the event.
