= Stetteldorf am Wagram =

- Municipality
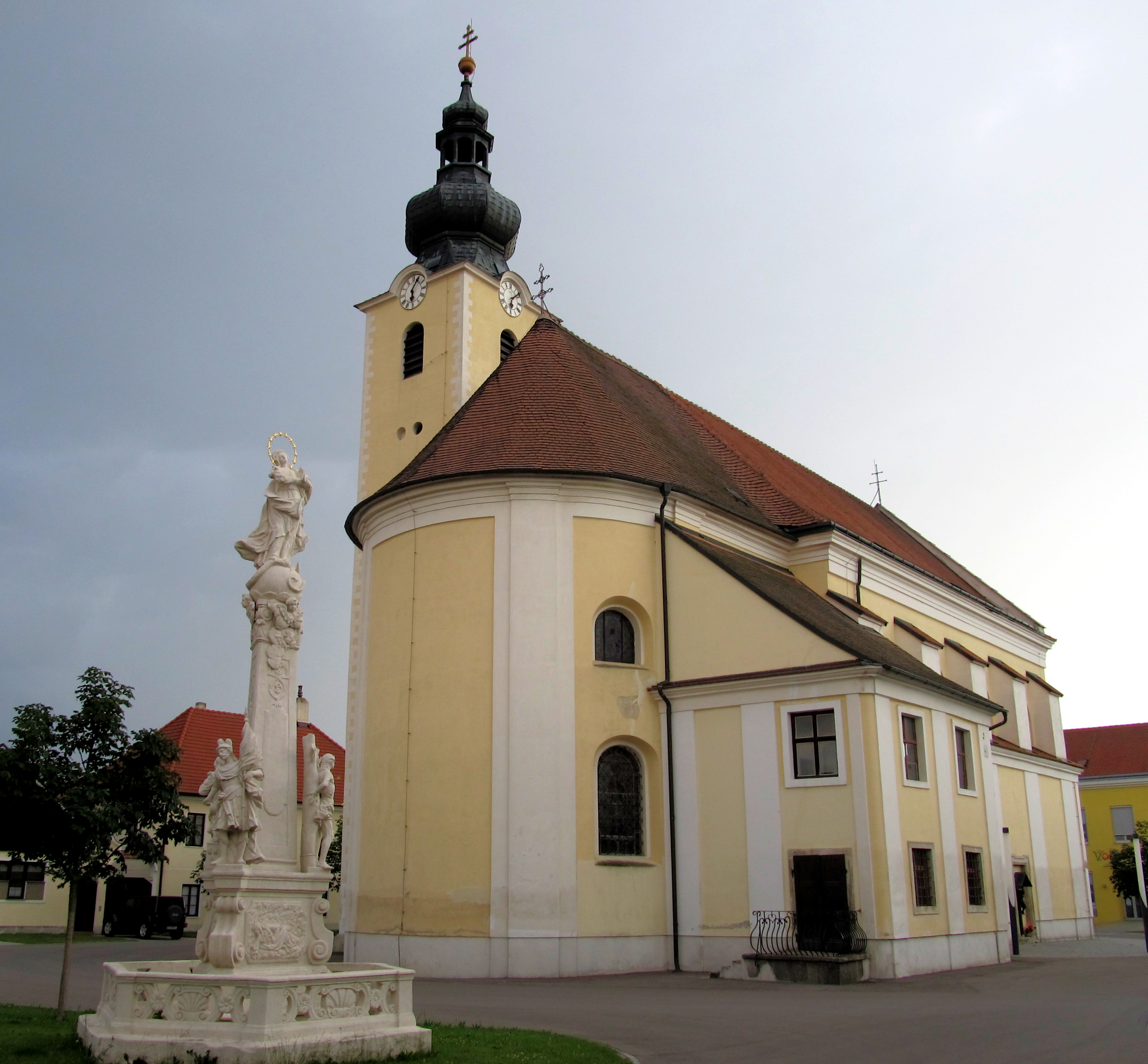
- Stetteldorf parish church

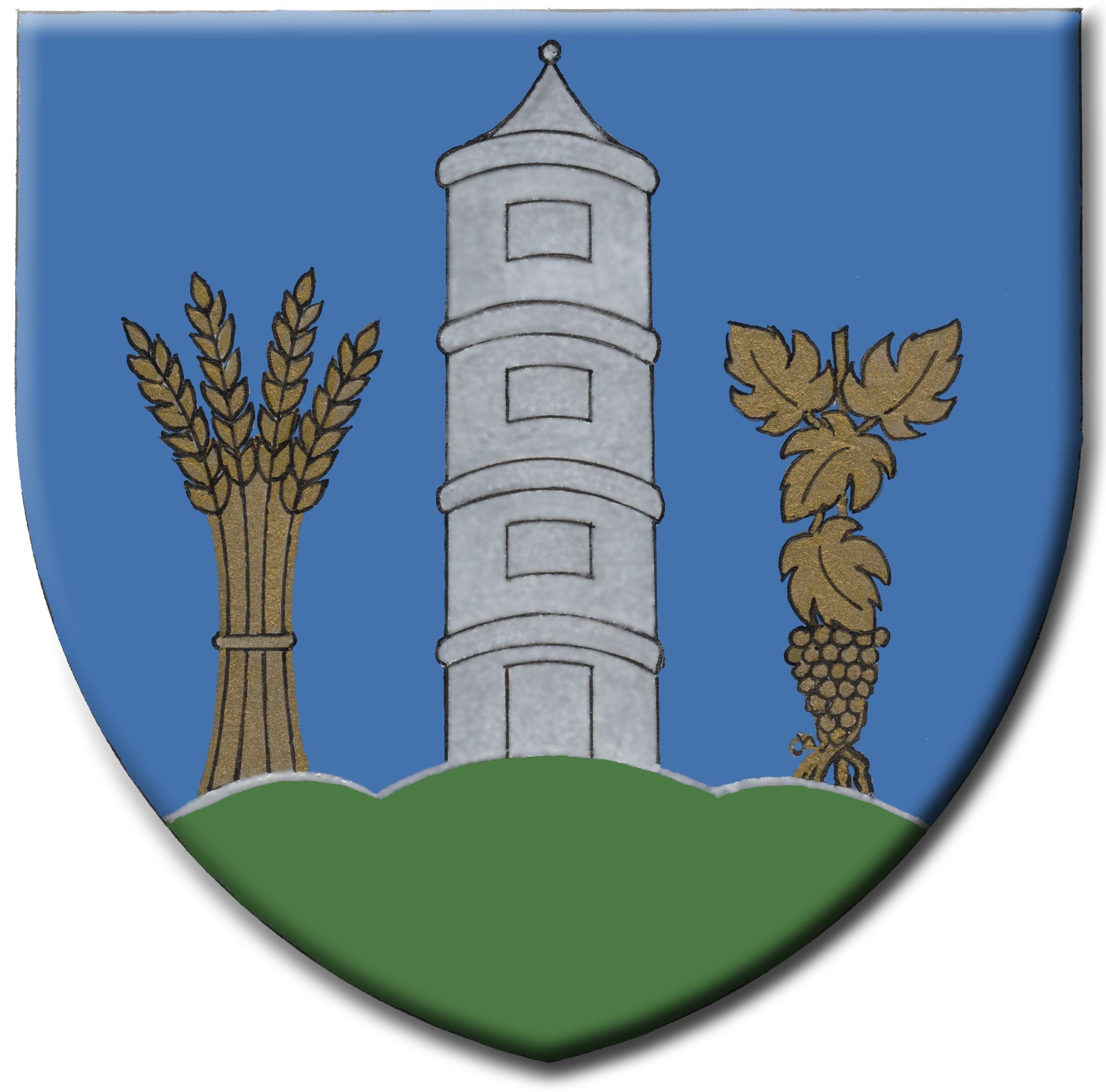
- Coat of arms

- Location within Austria
- Coordinates: 48°25′N 16°1′E
- Country: Austria
- State: Lower Austria
- District: Korneuburg

Government
  - Mayor: Josef Danksagmüller

Area
  - Total: 25.74 km^{2} (9.94 sq mi)
- Elevation: 213 m (699 ft)

Population (2018-01-01)
  - Total: 1,041
  - Density: 40.44/km^{2} (104.7/sq mi)
- Time zone: UTC+1 (CET)
  - Summer (DST): UTC+2 (CEST)
- Postal code: 3463
- Area code: 02278
- Website: www.stetteldorf-wagram.at

Stetteldorf am Wagram is a town in the district of Korneuburg in the Austrian state of Lower Austria.

== Population ==
Historical population
Year	Pop.	±%
1869	1,295	—
1880	1,306	+0.8%
1890	1,344	+2.9%
1900	1,394	+3.7%
1910	1,387	−0.5%
1923	1,321	−4.8%
1934	1,315	−0.5%
1939	1,252	−4.8%
1951	1,195	−4.6%
1961	1,119	−6.4%
1971	1,024	−8.5%
1981	884	−13.7%
1991	935	+5.8%
2001	1,021	+9.2%
2011	1,027	+0.6%
2021	1,047	+1.9%
