= Langenzersdorf =

- Municipality
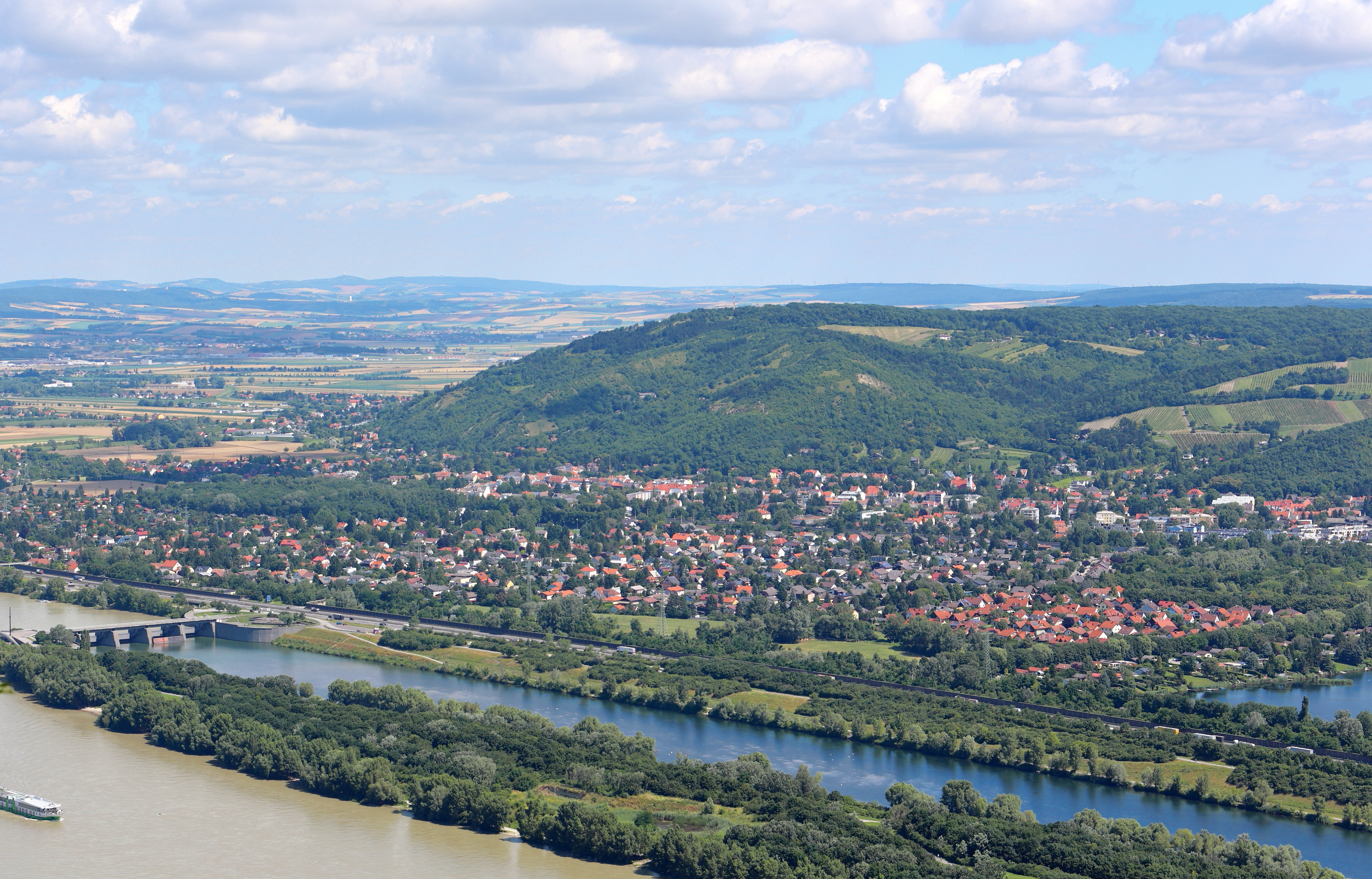

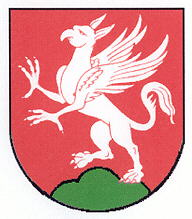
- Coat of arms

- Location within Austria
- Coordinates: 48°18′N 16°21′E
- Country: Austria
- State: Lower Austria
- District: Korneuburg

Government
  - Mayor: Andreas Arbesser

Area
  - Total: 10.7 km^{2} (4.1 sq mi)
- Elevation: 170 m (560 ft)

Population (2018-01-01)
  - Total: 8,137
  - Density: 760/km^{2} (1,970/sq mi)
- Time zone: UTC+1 (CET)
  - Summer (DST): UTC+2 (CEST)
- Postal code: 2103
- Area code: 02244
- Website: www.langenzersdorf.gv.at

Langenzersdorf (German pronunciation: [laŋˈʔɛnt͡sɐsdɔʁf]) is a town in the district of Korneuburg in Lower Austria, Austria, with a population of 8,153 (as of January 1, 2024).

== Population ==
Historical population
Year	Pop.	±%
1869	1,513	—
1880	1,835	+21.3%
1890	1,934	+5.4%
1900	2,549	+31.8%
1910	3,521	+38.1%
1923	3,897	+10.7%
1934	4,467	+14.6%
1939	4,302	−3.7%
1951	4,713	+9.6%
1961	4,495	−4.6%
1971	5,327	+18.5%
1981	5,388	+1.1%
1991	6,139	+13.9%
2001	7,261	+18.3%
2011	8,004	+10.2%
2021	8,084	+1.0%
2024	8,153	+0.9%
