= Korneuburg District =

Coordinates: 48.392°N 16.258°E

Korneuburg District Bezirk Korneuburg
- District
- Country: Austria
- State: Lower Austria
- Number of municipalities: 20
- Administrative seat: Korneuburg

Government
  - District Governor: Andreas Strobl

Area
  - Total: 662.0 km^{2} (255.6 sq mi)

Population (1 January 2016)
  - Total: 88,599
  - Density: 133.8/km^{2} (346.6/sq mi)
- Time zone: UTC+01:00 (CET)
  - Summer (DST): UTC+02:00 (CEST)
- Vehicle registration: KO

The political district Bezirk Korneuburg is located in Lower Austria and borders Vienna to the north.

== Communities ==
- Bisamberg
  - Bisamberg
  - Klein-Engersdorf
- Enzersfeld
  - Enzersfeld, Königsbrunn
- Ernstbrunn
  - Au, Dörfles, Ernstbrunn, Gebmanns, Klement, Lachsfeld, Maisbirbaum, Merkersdorf, Naglern, Simonsfeld, Steinbach, Thomasl
- Gerasdorf bei Wien
  - Gerasdorf, Föhrenhain, Kapellerfeld, Oberlisse, Seyring
- Großmugl
  - Füllersdorf, Geitzendorf, Glaswein, Großmugl, Herzogbirbaum, Nursch, Ottendorf, Ringendorf, Roseldorf, Steinabrunn
- Großrußbach
  - Großrußbach, Hipples, Karnabrunn, Kleinebersdorf, Weinsteig, Wetzleinsdorf
- Hagenbrunn
  - Flandorf, Hagenbrunn
- Harmannsdorf
  - Harmannsdorf, Hetzmannsdorf, Kleinrötz, Lerchenau, Mollmannsdorf, Obergänserndorf, Rückersdorf, Seebarn, Würnitz
- Hausleiten
  - Gaisruck, Goldgeben, Hausleiten, Perzendorf, Pettendorf, Schmida, Seitzersdorf-Wolfpassing, Zaina, Zissersdorf
- Korneuburg
- Langenzersdorf
- Leitzersdorf
  - Hatzenbach, Kleinwilfersdorf, Leitzersdorf, Wiesen, Wollmannsberg
- Leobendorf
  - Leobendorf, Oberrohrbach, Tresdorf, Unterrohrbach
- Niederhollabrunn
  - Bruderndorf, Haselbach, Niederfellabrunn, Niederhollabrunn, Streitdorf
- Rußbach
  - Niederrußbach, Oberrußbach, Stranzendorf
- Sierndorf
  - Höbersdorf, Oberhautzental, Obermallebarn, Oberolberndorf, Senning, Sierndorf, Unterhautzental, Untermallebarn, Unterparschenbrunn
- Spillern
- Stetteldorf am Wagram
  - Eggendorf am Wagram, Inkersdorf, Starnwörth, Stetteldorf am Wagram
- Stetten
- Stockerau
  - Oberzögersdorf, Stockerau, Unterzögersdorf

== Changes ==
Since 2017 Gerasdorf bei Wien is now part of the district on the dissolution of the Wien-Umgebung District.
