= Korneuburg =

Town in Lower Austria, Austria

Korneuburg Korneibuag
- Municipality
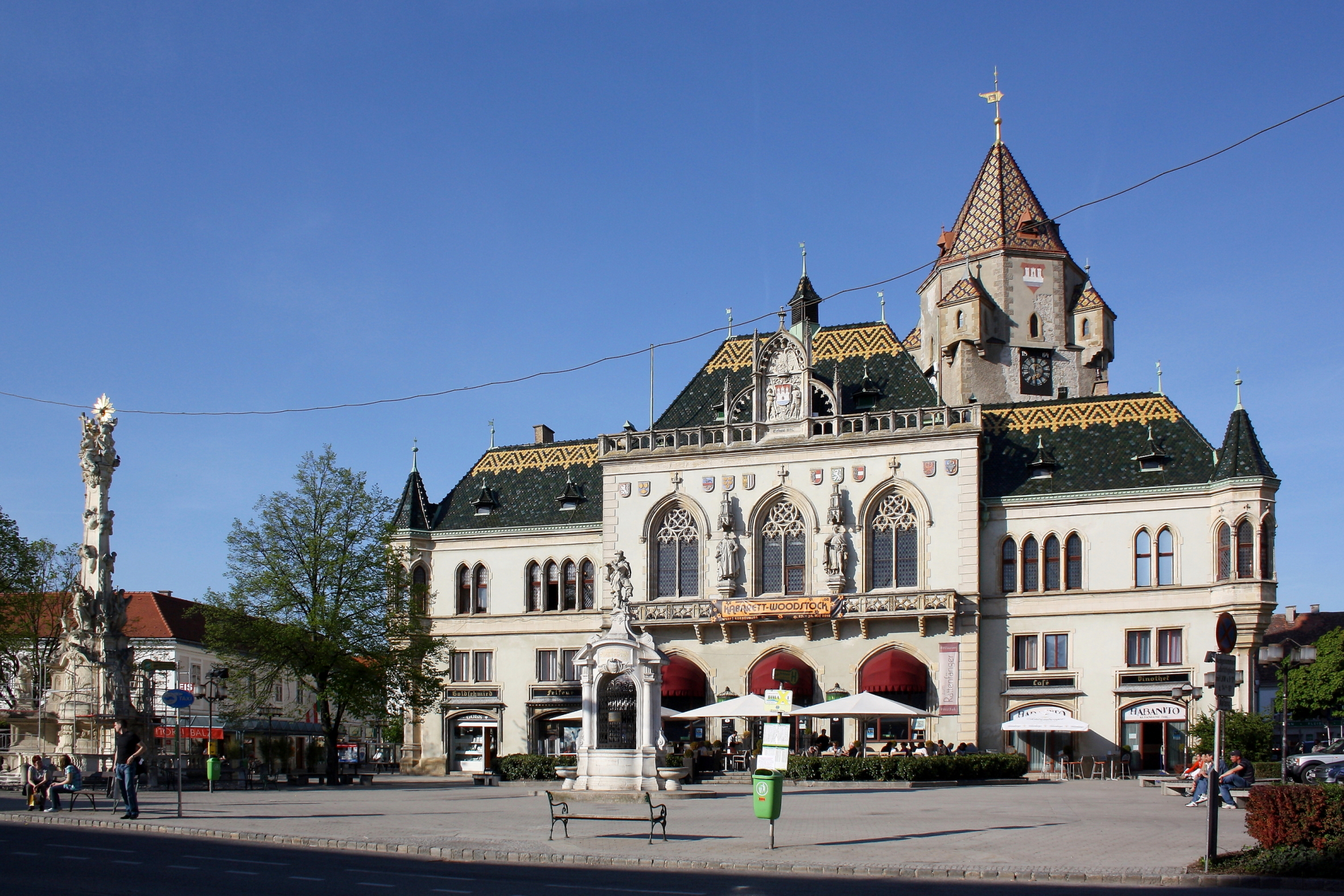
- Town hall of Korneuburg

- Coat of arms

- Location within Austria
- Coordinates: 48°20′43″N 16°19′59″E
- Country: Austria
- State: Lower Austria
- District: Korneuburg

Government
  - Mayor: Christian Gepp (ÖVP)

Area
  - Total: 9.77 km^{2} (3.77 sq mi)
- Elevation: 168 m (551 ft)

Population (2018-01-01)
  - Total: 12,986
  - Density: 1,330/km^{2} (3,440/sq mi)
- Time zone: UTC+1 (CET)
  - Summer (DST): UTC+2 (CEST)
- Postal code: 2100
- Area code: 02262
- Vehicle registration: KO
- Website: Stadt Korneuburg (in German)

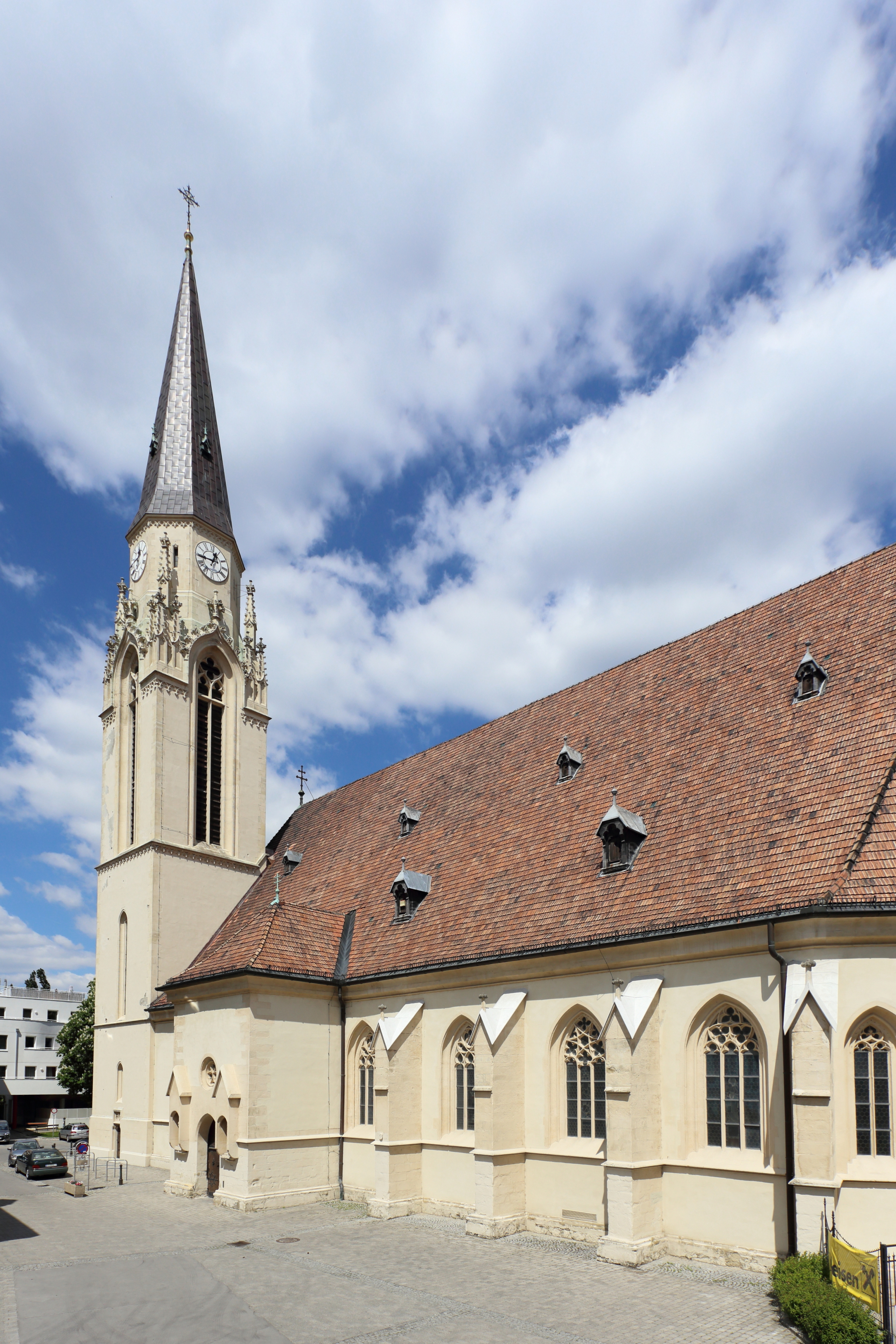
Korneuburg - Catholic Church of Saint Egidius

Korneuburg (German pronunciation: [kɔʁˈnɔʏbʊʁk]; Central Bavarian: Korneibuag) is a town in the Weinviertel region of the province of Lower Austria, famous for its typical white and red wines, such as Gruner Veltliner and Blauer Zweigelt. Situated on the Danube about 12 km northwest of Vienna, the town itself covers an area of 9.77 square km and, as of January 2025, boasted 13,805 inhabitants. It also serves as the administrative centre of the much larger municipal district of Korneuburg.

Originally a riverside settlement called Nivenburg, it lies on the left bank of the river, opposite the Augustinian abbey town of Klosterneuburg, with which it was historically linked. Korneuburg was first mentioned in 1136 as a busy market town and, in 1298, received the right to formally separate from Klosterneuburg.

Nowadays, the two towns retain an unusual physical link, a catamaran ferry whose rudders harness the strong current of the Danube to propel itself back and forth. With no regular engine, it maintains its position using a cable suspended above the river. Environmentally friendly, it provides a very popular link in summer, since it connects the long distance cycling routes along both river banks. It can also accommodate a handful of cars along with foot passengers.

At the beginning of the 15th century, moated defence walls were erected around the town with four gateways. One opened in the direction of the river, towards which, according to local legend, a vengeful Pied Piper lured away the children of the town, echoing the story set in Hamelin, Germany. The villain's imagined appearance can be seen standing atop a drinking fountain in the main square.

Short sections of wall are still visible but the main historic feature today is a mighty watchtower, built around 1455, which looms over the colourful main square. From its symmetrically placed erker windows, it affords excellent views in all directions over the town and surrounding countryside. In turbulent times, it was occupied by a watchman to spot and warn of dangers, such as fires or approaching soldiers. Once part of a mediaeval church, demolished in the 19th century, the tower was incorporated by the architect Max Kropf into his neo-Gothic town hall which now dominates the main square. Designed in the historicist style, it contains colourful tile and fresco ornamentation, with an impressive double staircase leading up to the fine council chamber with its coffered ceiling. Both the tower and town hall can usually be visited during office hours, however the tower is currently closed for restoration.

Due to its strategic location on the Danube, not far upstream from the capital, Korneuburg frequently fell victim to marauding armies on their way to attack Vienna. For example, the town suffered during the long conflict between the Hungarian king Matthias Corvinus and the Habsburg emperor Frederick III. A number of later major military campaigns ravaged the town, including the Thirty Years' War, the Ottoman Siege of 1683 or Battle of Vienna, the French Revolutionary and Napoleonic Wars, and Allied bombing during the Oil Campaign of World War II. However, each time the industrious citizens managed to re-build the town so that today it presents a pretty mix of original late mediaeval housing and shops, interspersed with carefully restored buildings.

A maze of passageways and side streets run off the main square, and along one of these is the oldest building of any kind in the town, the ancient synagogue. Erected in the 14th century, it soon lost its religious purpose with the expulsion of the Jews from Habsburg lands in 1421. Over the centuries it has been sadly neglected and suffered various types of misuse, including serving as a horse-powered mill (hence the name of the side street on which it stands, the Rossmuhlgasse). Even in its ruinous condition and barely recognisable as a former place of worship, it remains one of the oldest synagogue structures in Central Europe. Efforts to acquire and restore the building, now in private ownership and utilised as a garage workshop, have failed, perhaps due to the costs involved, although rather ironically it appears on the national catalogue as a protected historic landmark.

Korneuburg's main industry for well over a hundred years was the shipyard of the famous "Donaudampfschiffahrtsgesellschaft“ or Danube Steamboat Company. Opened in 1852, it served as the principal site for the construction and repair of its large fleet of ships and barges. After the Nazi annexation of Austria in 1938, the shipyard was integrated into the Hermann-Göring-Werke, and significantly enlarged. Thus in 1941, 16 barracks were built to house forced labourers and prisoners of war. In 1945, the Red Army captured the shipyard. Closed in 1993, with its four remaining assembly halls placed under protection as historic landmarks, the Korneuburg Shipyard is nowadays the site of a branch of the Museum of Military History, Vienna comprising two patrol boats, Niederösterreich and Oberst Brecht. These were the Austrian Army's last patrol ships on the Danube, and the successors of the KuK Kriegsmarine.

Nowadays Korneuburg is no longer so dependent on a single industry but has successfully diversified into a wide range of modern activities, while its proximity to Vienna has led to an increasing development of flats and houses to accommodate new generations of commuters into the capital city.

== Population development ==
- 1900: 8,292
- 1939: 9,893
- 1971: 9,023
- 2012: 12,267
- 2025: 13,805

== People ==
- Johann Georg Lickl (1769–1843), Austrian composer, organist and piano teacher.
- Rudolph Philip Waagner (1827–1888), civil engineer
- Max Burckhard (1854–1912), director Burgtheater, the national theater of Austria in Vienna, 1890 to 1898.
- Nico Dostal (1895–1981), Austrian Operetta and film music composer
- Viktor Matejka (1901–1993), Austrian writer and politician
- Fritz Cejka (1928–2020), an Austrian football forward who played over 430 games
- Edith Hörandner (1939–2008), folklorist and educator.
- Kurt Binder (1944-2022), Austrian theoretical physicist
- Helmuth Lehner (born 1968), singer and guitarist of the Blackened death metal band Belphegor
- Mario Majstorović (born 1977), footballer, played over 300 games
