= Wir kaufen Seelen =

1998 performance artwork by monochrom

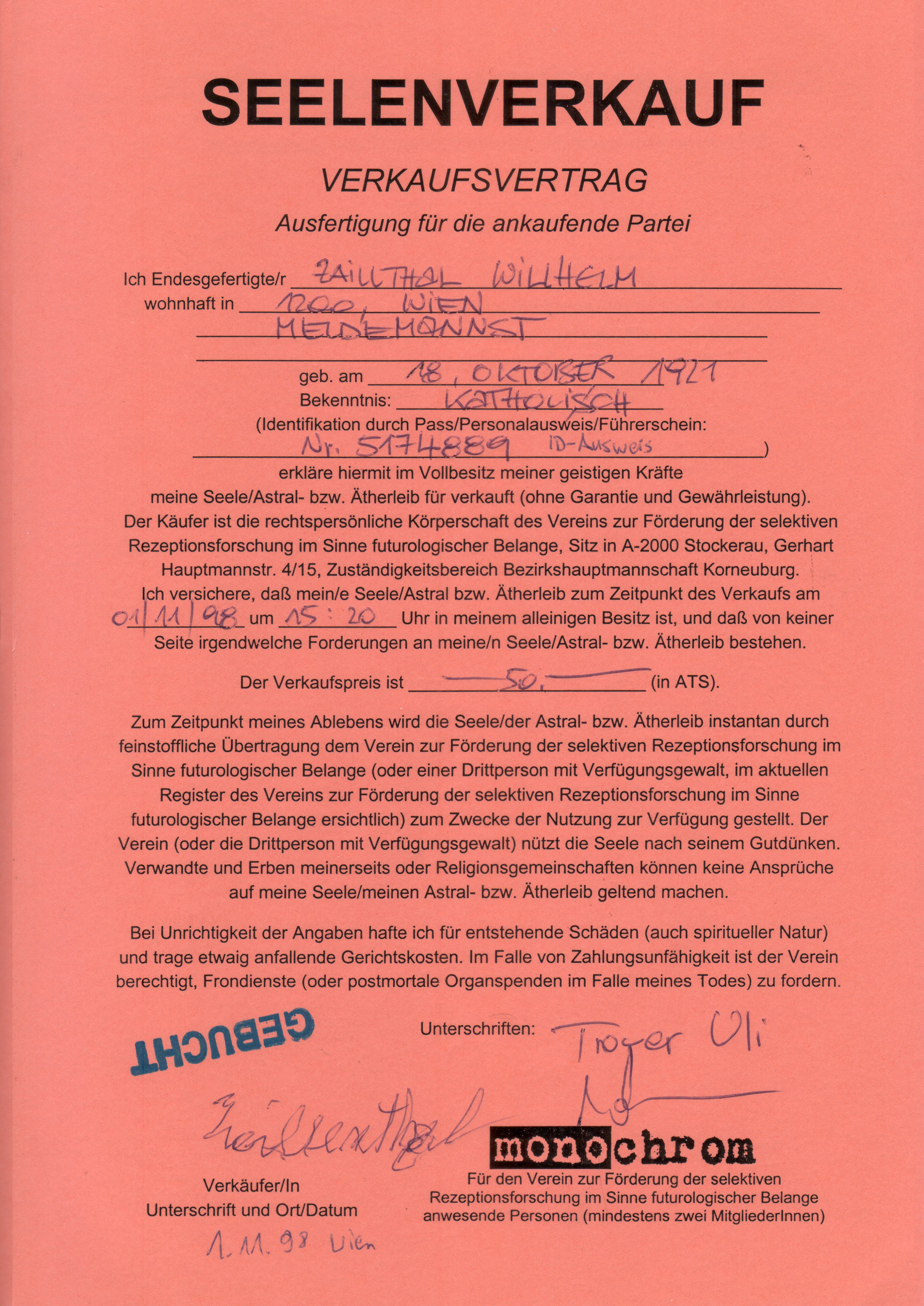
monochrom's soul sale contract ("Wir kaufen Seelen"), 1998

Wir kaufen Seelen (also known as Seelenankauf or Soul Sale) is a 1998 performance by Austrian art theory group monochrom and is considered a significant work in the group's history and Austrian art history in the 1990s.

On 1 November 1998 (All Souls' Day), monochrom members Johannes Grenzfurthner and Harald Homolka-List (supported by their friend Ulrich Troyer) staged a "spirituo-capitalist booth" at Stock-im-Eisen-Platz (very close to St. Stephen's Cathedral in Vienna's first district) where the project members tried to buy the souls of passers-by for ATS 50 (roughly US$5) per soul. The "acquisition team" performed an "evaluation routine" to check the "quality" of the soul of interested sellers, for example by asking jargon-laden philosophical questions, by using a divining rod and similar pseudoscientific techniques. A total of fifteen were purchased and registered. These souls are still being offered for sale to third parties.

The group sees the project - beyond all philosophical discourses and argumentation seeking to prove the existence of God or an afterlife - in the classical sense of a market driven by supply and demand. For the group it "doesn't actually matter if there is a soul, as long as it can be sold for a profit. The soul is a tradable commodity, a form of virtual capital."

The performance has been presented in exhibitions and debated in magazines and in academic circles.
