= Carefully Selected Moments =

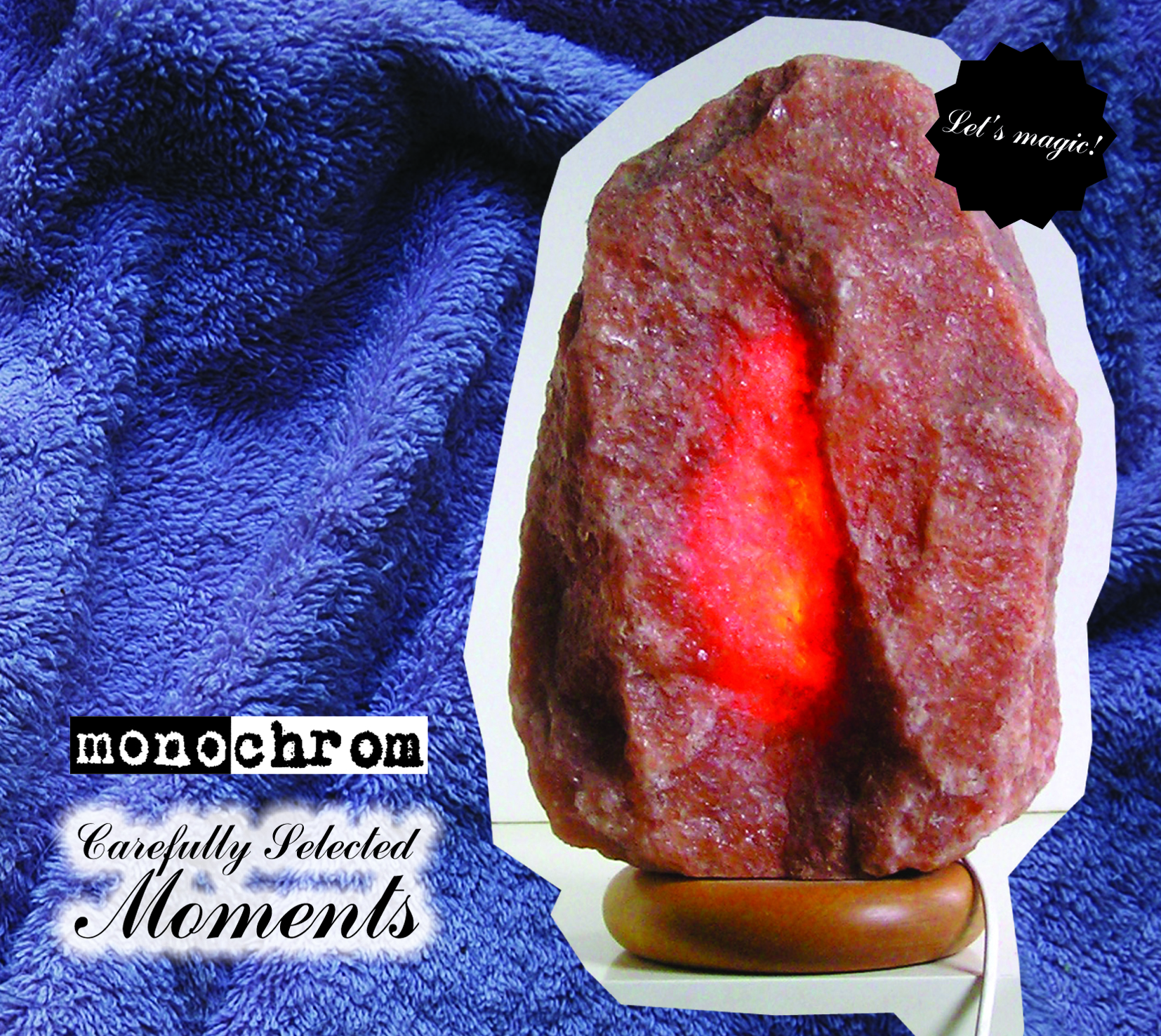

Greatest hits album by monochrom
- Released: 10 June 2008
- Recorded: 1993–2008
- Genre: pop, rock, country, electronic dance music, electronica, experimental
- Length: 73:08
- Label: Trost Records, monochrom
- Producer: Günther Friesinger

Carefully Selected Moments is a compilation album by Austrian art and theory group monochrom that was released on 10 June 2008 in Austria. The album was intended to be a best-of collection of the group's musical output. The album is being distributed by Trost Records.

== Background ==
To celebrate monochrom's 15th anniversary, the members decided to release a CD containing a variety of songs the group had previously created for their art projects, live shows and theater performances. Part of the concept was to invite musicians and music formations to re-record or re-mix some of monochrom's tracks. Most of the vocal performances are by members of monochrom, e.g. Johannes Grenzfurthner and Evelyn Fürlinger.

The songs range from genres like country and pop to club music and experimental music. The lyrics, partially in German and English, are political and deal with various controversial issues, like mass surveillance, migration, critique of capitalism and heteronormativity.

The album was financially supported by Österreichischer Musikfonds and SKE (austro mechana).

Song examples

- The tracks Let's Network It Out (Flat Nashville Hierarchy Version) and Tonki Gebauer: Song (Excerpt) were originally recorded as part of the Georg Paul Thomann project.
- Waun i schiaß and Could It Be were originally created for monochrom's stage musical Udo 77, but re-recorded in a studio.
- The song Der Oxo Raster. An Electronical Palimpsest is a cover version of the song "Oxo la terre" by Raymond Lefèvre.

== Track listing ==
No.	Title	Length
1.	"Garz" (feat. Der Schwimmer)	4:00
2.	"Waun i schiaß revisited" (feat. Max Of Prey))	4:48
3.	"eBay the force" (feat. Hans Nieswandt)	5:20
4.	"Could It Be"	4:45
5.	"Der Oxo Raster. An Electronical Palimpsest" (feat. Electronič)	3:15
6.	"Die wichtigsten Gründe"	4:28
7.	"Killing Capitalism With Christmas" (feat. Gerald Votava and GameJew)	2:56
8.	"Flowers" (feat. Matthias Kertal)	1:58
9.	"Farewell To Overhead (Which Was A Popular School Broadcasting Technique Back In The Old Days)"	5:00
10.	"Hello Lando"	1:09
11.	"Lidl-Girl"	5:32
12.	"Let's Network It Out (Flat Nashville Hierarchy Version)"	3:14
13.	"myfacespace.com" (feat. GameJew)	6:48
14.	"Im söbn Boot" (feat. Gegenstimmen)	3:18
15.	"Die oide Celtic Frost"	2:15
16.	"Die Moritat von Parati"	5:19
17.	"Tonki Gebauer: Song (Excerpt)"	9:14
Total length:		1:13:08

== Reception ==
The CD has been discussed and analyzed in music magazines and academic publications.
