= Jason Scott =

American historian and archivist (born 1970)

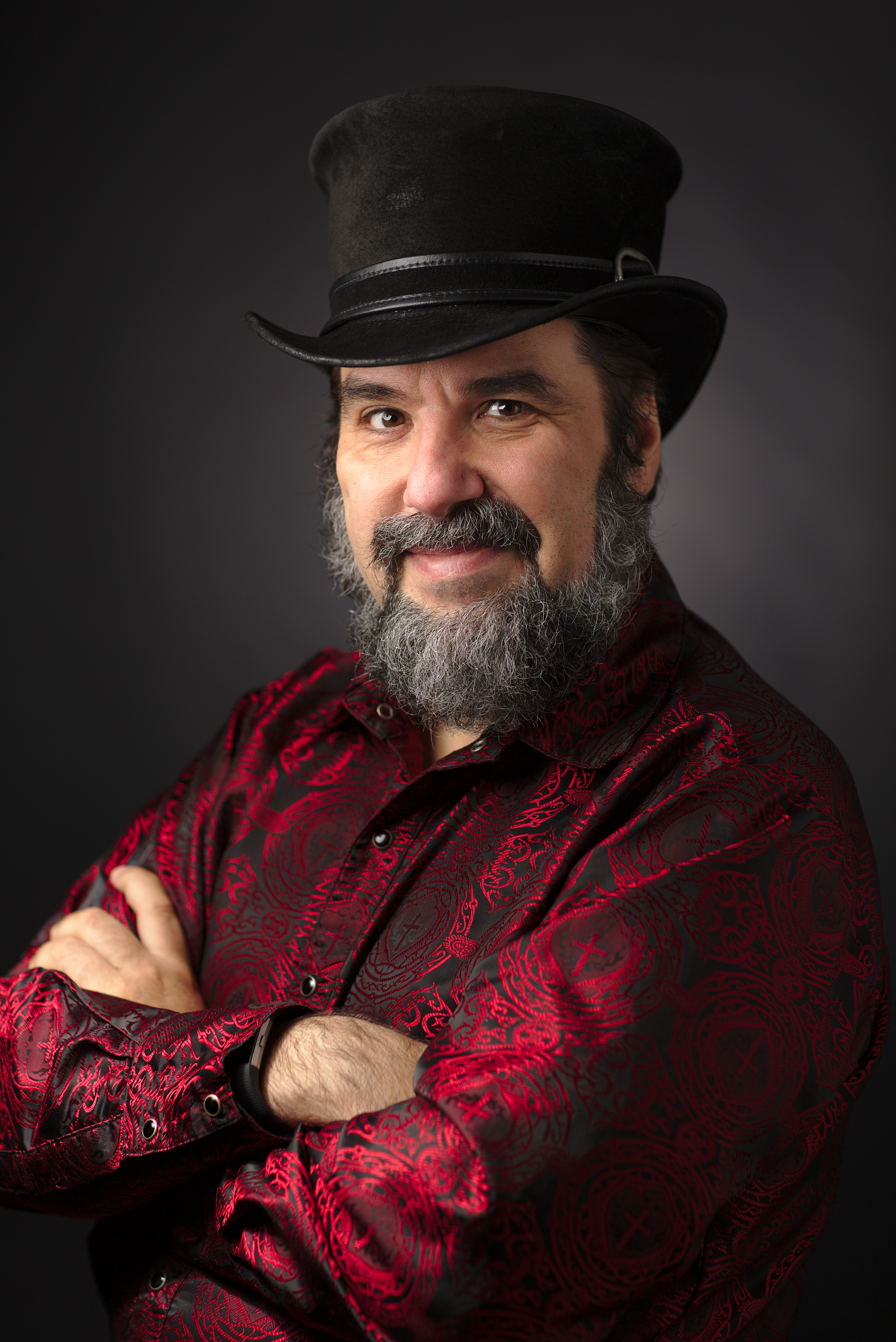
- Scott in 2017
- Born: Jason Scott Sadofsky; September 13, 1970 (age 56); Hopewell Junction, New York, U.S.
- Education: Emerson College
- Occupation: Archivist
- Known for: Archivist and historian of technology, performer, internet personality

Jason Scott Sadofsky (born September 13, 1970) is an American archivist, historian of technology, filmmaker, performer, and actor. Scott has been known by the online pseudonyms Sketch, SketchCow, Sketch The Cow, The Slipped Disk, and textfiles. He has been called "the figurehead of the digital archiving world".

Scott is the creator, owner and maintainer of textfiles.com, a web site which archives files from historic bulletin board systems. He is the creator of a 2005 documentary film about BBSes, BBS: The Documentary, and a 2010 documentary film about interactive fiction, GET LAMP.

Scott lives in New York state. He was the co-owner of the late Twitter celebrity cat Sockington. He works for the Internet Archive and has given numerous presentations at technology related conferences on the topics of digital history, software, and website preservation.

== Early life ==
Jason Scott Sadofsky graduated from Horace Greeley High School in Chappaqua, New York, and served on the staff of the school newspaper under the title "Humor Staff". While in high school he produced the humor magazine Esnesnon ("nonsense" backwards). He later graduated from Emerson College in 1992 with a film degree. While at Emerson, he worked for the school humor magazine, school newspaper, WERS 88.9 FM radio, and served as art director on several dramatic plays.

== Career ==
After graduating from Emerson, Scott lived in Harvard Square in Cambridge, Massachusetts, where he was employed as a temp worker while also drawing caricatures for pay on the streets of Cambridge.

In 1990, Scott co-created TinyTIM, a popular MUSH that he ran for ten years. In 1995, Jason joined the video game company Psygnosis as a technical support worker, before being hired by a video game startup, Focus Studios, as an art director. After Focus Studios' closure, Jason moved into UNIX administration, where he remained until 2009.

He has been a speaker at DEF CON, an annual hacker conference, the first time at the 7th conference in 1999, and has spoken there almost every year since then. Scott also spoke at PhreakNIC 6 and 9, Rubi Cons 4 and 5, the 5th H.O.P.E. conference in 2004, Notacons 1, 2 (as a backup), 3 and 4, Toorcon 7, and beta premiered his documentary at the 7th annual Vintage Computer Festival. Most of his talks focus on the capturing of digital history or consist of narratives of stories relevant to his experiences online.

In 2006, Scott announced that he was starting a documentary on video arcades, titled ARCADE. Although he did not complete the project, all of the footage he shot for ARCADE has been made available on the Internet Archive.

In 2007, he co-founded Blockparty, a North American demoparty. For their inaugural year, they paired up with Notacon which takes place annually in Cleveland, Ohio. This collaborative effort allowed the fledgling party to utilize the existing support structure of an established conference.

In January 2009, he formed "Archive Team," a group dedicated to preserving the historical record of websites that close down. Responding to the announcement by AOL of the closure of AOL Hometown, the team announced plans to save Podango and GeoCities.

In October 2009, he started raising funds for a year-long sabbatical from his job as a computer systems administrator, to pursue technology history and archival projects full-time. By November 2009, he had reached his funding goals, with the support of over 300 patrons.

In early 2011, he was involved in Yahoo! Video and Google Video archive projects.

Scott announced the creation of Archive Corps, a volunteer effort to preserve physical archives, in 2015.

Scott has been hosting his own podcast called Jason Scott Talks His Way Out of It since 2017.

Scott is the software curator at the Internet Archive. In April 2019, he uploaded all of the source code for Infocom's text-based adventure games and interactive fiction, including Zork and The Hitchhiker's Guide to the Galaxy, to GitHub.

=== Sockington ===
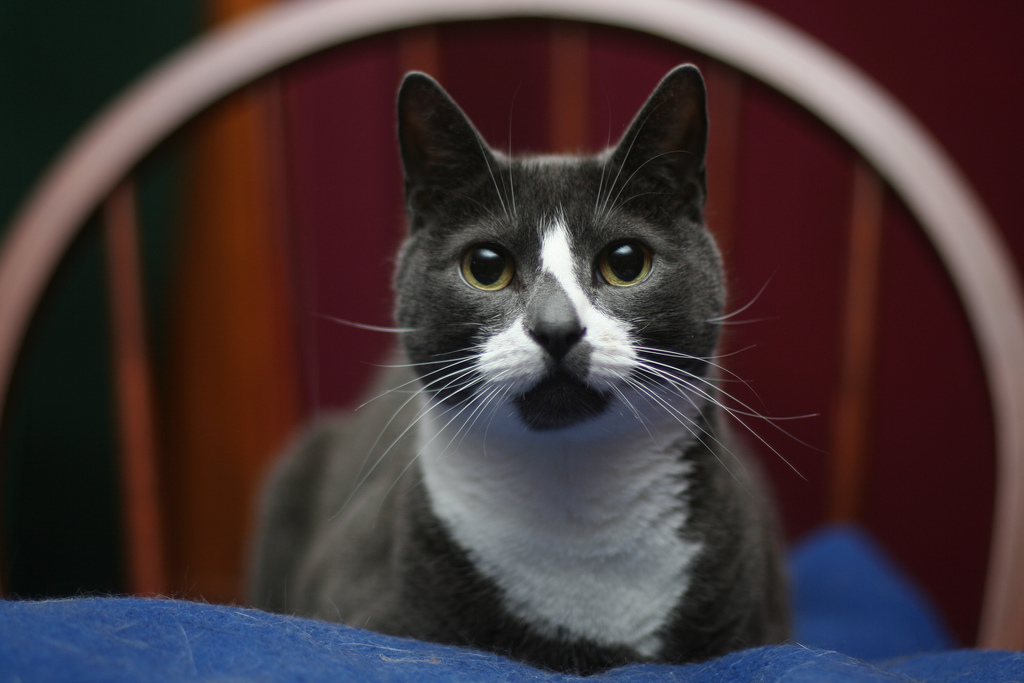
Scott's cat, Sockington

Sockington was a domestic cat who lived in Waltham, Massachusetts. He gained large-scale fame via the social networking site Twitter. Scott regularly posted from Sockington's Twitter account from late 2007. As of January 2018, Sockington's account has over 1.4 million followers, many of which are pet accounts themselves. Sockington died on July 18, 2022.

=== Acting ===
Scott is a frequent collaborator of Johannes Grenzfurthner and appeared as an actor in Soviet Unterzoegersdorf: Sector 2 (2009), Glossary of Broken Dreams (2018), and the science fiction comedy Je Suis Auto (2019).

== Personal life ==
Divorced, Scott was engaged as of 2017.

== Filmography ==
- BBS: The Documentary (2005) (director)
- GET LAMP (2010) (director)
- Going Cardboard (2012) (editor)
- DEFCON: The Documentary (2013) (director)
- Traceroute (2016) (interviewee)
- Glossary of Broken Dreams (2018) (actor)
- Class Action Park (2020) (interviewee)
- Musings of a Mechatronic Mistress (2023) (interviewee)
- Hacking at Leaves (2024) (interviewee)

== General references ==
- Jason Scott, The Defendant (July 2001). So You Got Your Lame Ass Sued: A Legal Narrative. DEF CON speaker. Retrieved 2004-11-19.
- Jason Sadofsky, The Tribune Articles, 1987–88
- Jason Scott, The Life and Times of Jason Scott
- DEF CON 13 (2005) speakers Archived June 30, 2005, at the Wayback Machine, including Jason Scott's "Why Tech Documentaries Are Impossible"
