= Traceroute (film) =

- Directed by: Johannes Grenzfurthner
- Written by: Johannes Grenzfurthner
- Produced by: Johannes Grenzfurthner, Andreas Reisenbauer, Heather Kelley, Guenther Friesinger
- Narrated by: Johannes Grenzfurthner
- Cinematography: Eddie Codel
- Production companies: monochrom, Reisenbauer Film
- Distributed by: monochrom, Reisenbauer Film
- Release date: April 28, 2016 (NYC Independent Film Festival)
- Running time: 120 minutes
- Countries: Austria, United States
- Languages: English, German

Traceroute is a 2016 Austrian-American documentary film directed by Johannes Grenzfurthner. The autobiographical documentary and road movie deals with the history, politics and impact of nerd culture. Grenzfurthner calls his film a "personal journey into the uncharted depths of nerd culture, a realm full of dangers, creatures and more or less precarious working conditions", an attempt to "chase the ghosts of nerddom's past, present and future." The film was co-produced by art group monochrom and Reisenbauer Film. It features music by Kasson Crooker, Hans Nieswandt, and many others.

== Concept ==
Artist and self-declared nerd Johannes Grenzfurthner is documenting his personal road trip from the West Coast to the East Coast of the United States, to introduce the audience to places and people that shaped and inspired his art and politics. Traceroute is a reflection on Grenzfurthner's own roots of nerddom, an "On the road style romp across the United States as he visits icons of the counterculture, the outré, and the generally questionable." Grenzfurthner summarizes the concept in an interview for Boing Boing: "It is a film on biographies and obsessions and spaces of possibility – in other words something between loving embrace and merciless vivisection. Maintaining a critical meta-outlook was just as important to me as abandoning myself to unfathomable stammerings of adoration. And that all works for one simple reason: because I take a step forward, introducing myself and confessing my guilt like in Alcoholics Anonymous, only to then take off and visit the best whiskey distilleries. In my case these destinations are not whiskey makers, but people and places and symbols of a very special pop culture." On Film Threat he adds: "It was important for me to take nerddom apart, not only analyzing it, but also excavating its potential for greatness."

The film incorporates art and illustrations by James Brothwell, Bonni Rambatan, Michael Marrak, Karin Frank, Ben Lawson, Michael Zeltner, Josh Ellingson and eSeL in a cinematic collage that draws inspiration from 1990s fanzine and punk aesthetics, BBS culture, ANSI art and fantastic art. UK Film Review's Hannah Sayer summarizes the artistic style of the film in her review: "There is a real sense that this is a collaborative exploration of creativity: of the old and the new, the past and the present, and the traditional and the digital. The use of photography and drawings interspersed between the interviews with various people associated with nerd culture shows an artistic approach to the material and these images act as reflective snapshots of moments in time, reinforcing the importance of looking back to the past as well as looking forward to the future of the digital age."

== Cast ==
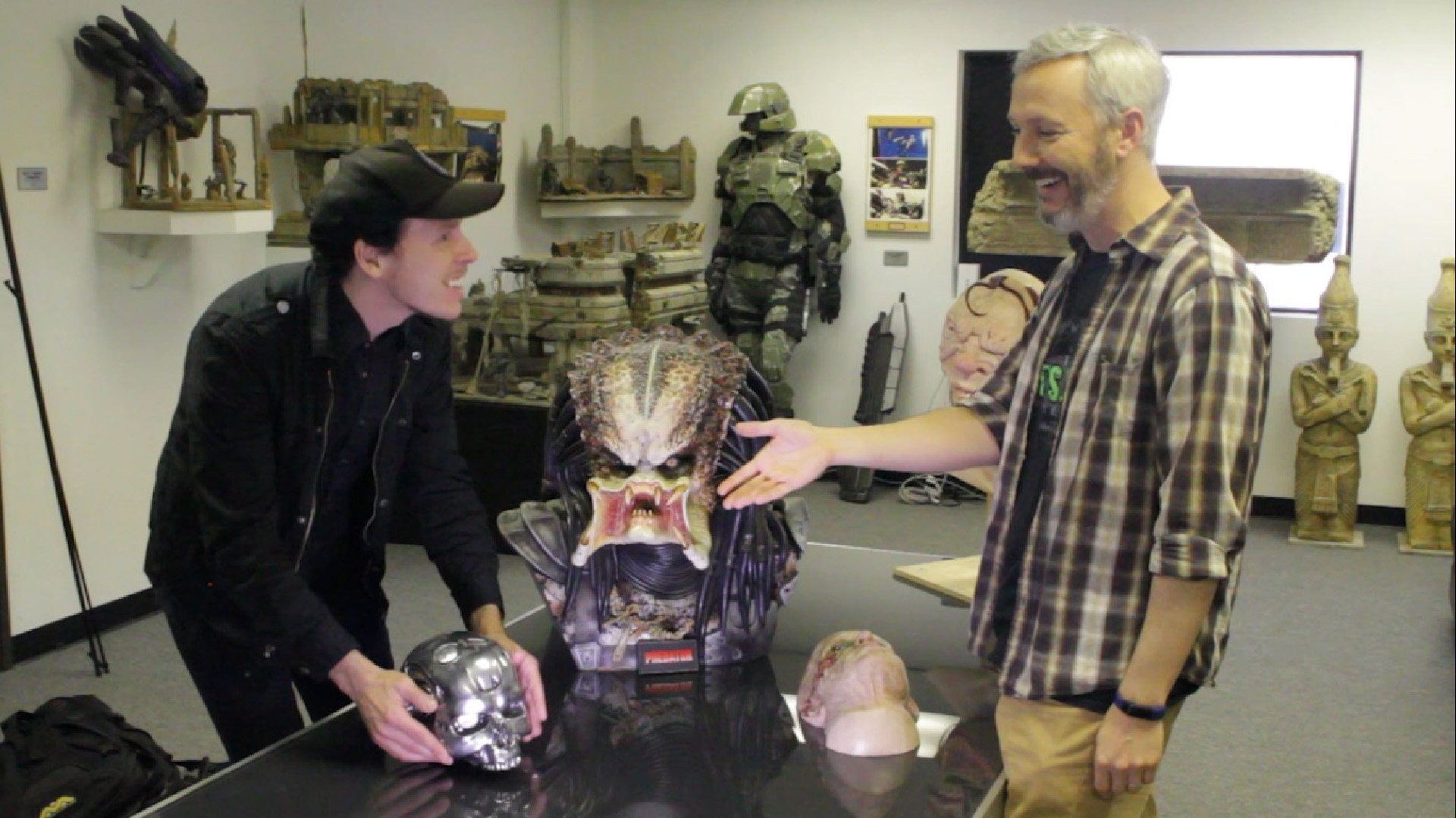
Traceroute: Johannes Grenzfurthner and Matt Winston talk about Stan Winston and special effects.

Traceroute features interviews with Matt Winston, Sandy Stone, Bruce Sterling, Jason Scott, Christina Agapakis, Trevor Paglen, Ryan Finnigan, Kit Stubbs, V. Vale, Sean Bonner, Allison Cameron, Josh Ellingson, Maggie Mayhem, Paolo Pedercini, Steve Tolin, Dan Wilcox, Jon Lebkowsky, Jan "Varka" Mulders (of Bad Dragon), Adam Flynn, Abie Hadjitarkhani, Kelly Poots, and some special guest appearances (e.g. National Park Service spokesperson Vickie Carson, hacker Nick Farr and cultural curator Scott Beale).

Metronaut writes: "Traceroute offers deep insights into the world of nerddom. A woman who creates cheese from bacteria on sweaty feet. A man who wants to construct a giant network of independent Geiger counters. Or a sex worker who identifies as a nerd. The multitude of topics and people shows how being a nerd is not restricted to programming and computers."

== Production ==
=== Writing ===
Grenzfurthner performed a stand-up show called Schicksalsjahre eines Nerds at Vienna's Rabenhof Theater in 2014. Parts of this show form the basis of Traceroute. The basic script, although many scenes and interviews were improvised, was written by Johannes Grenzfurthner. The film's main language is English but features archival footage in German.

=== Filming ===
Principal photography commenced on March 5, 2015, and ended March 27, 2015. The film utilized microfilmmaking and guerrilla filmmaking techniques in its production.

=== Sound design ===
Daniel Hasibar and Christian Staudacher created the sound design and audioscape underlying Grenzfurthner's narration.

== Music ==
The film features music by Peter Barnett, Kasson Crooker, Damien Di Fede, Matthew Huffaker, Brady Leo, Vera Lynn, Kevin MacLeod, Hans Nieswandt, Roger Sandega and Eric Skiff, among others.

== Distribution ==
The film's world premiere took place at NYC Independent Film Festival on April 28, 2016. The European premiere took place at DOK.fest Munich (Internationales Dokumentarfilmfestival München) on May 13, 2016. The film has been screened at various film festivals and conventions, including Hackers on Planet Earth 2016, Gen Con 2016, the European Media Arts Festival 2016 in Osnabrück, Dutch Design Week 2016, NRW-Forum 2016, Print Screen Festival 2016 in Tel Aviv, FrackFest 2016, Norwich Radical Film Festival, the Chaos Communication Congress 2016 and Guangzhou International Documentary Film Festival 2016.

The film had a theatrical release in Austria in 2016.

Traceroute was digitally released on March 21, 2017.

== Reception ==
=== Critical response ===
Reviews of the film have been positive. Bradley Gibson of Film Threat gives Traceroute 10/10 points and writes: "Traceroute is the most fun I've ever had watching a documentary. If you're a nerd (and you are) this is the road trip you've always wanted to take with your smartest, geekiest friend. You're not going to want to come home. It's Cosmos. It's DragonCon on wheels. It's your favorite sex fantasy. It's alcohol soaked nonviolent subversive protest mobile and WiFi linked. It's On The Road updated with tech, science, pseudoscience, sex, and fandom." Mental Floss' Chris Higgins writes about Traceroute: "As many nerds have noticed, there's a glut of nerd-positive documentaries out there, but they tend to be either too self-serious, or too focused on the trappings of fandom to actually say much. Traceroute manages to be a real film, with humor and true insight (sometimes called out for us—and delightfully nullified—with a blinking 'INSIGHT' faux-HTML tag onscreen), primarily because it focuses on Grenzfurthner's personal journey, and he doesn't take himself too seriously. Let's put that another way: The director uses himself and a handful of subjects to create his story, and that specificity—coupled with his playfulness—makes it work. At one point he licks the chrome head of a Terminator prop. Then he licks a zombie head prop. Then he licks the propmaster himself. It's delightful." Pop culture magazine Boing Boing calls Traceroute "a brilliantly careening biography of a highly enigmatic species. [...] Traceroute is radical individual empiricism, a narrative biographical puzzle and an experimental projection matrix. Despite continual stimulus satiation, it is wonderful fun: the film tickles the synapses with a perfectly mixed cocktail of collectively shared context and quirkiness."

Patrick Lichty of net culture magazine Furtherfield calls it "magical (...) After watching Traceroute, I was left with a real exhilaration and a deeply reflective feeling at once. (...) What Traceroute reveals is the tradition of alterity just beneath the surface of Western culture, and that it has a powerful effect on our mass consciousness, whether it is in plain sight or not." Felix Knoke of Engadget Germany writes: "For me it is the best nerd documentary I've seen so far. Simply for the fact that it doesn't take itself as deadly serious as the other ones. (...) Traceroute deserves high praise because it represents an old-school definition of nerd culture, one that is never compatible with fintech, unicorn and iGod." Pop culture critic Thomas Kaestle comments: "Traceroute is game, challenge, encyclopedia, and sentimental journey all in one. As a documentary it is most skillfully composed. And as a narration it is highly compatible. This film will, in passing, sweep proclaimed nerds off their feet. And it will touch the hearts of those who still need some explanation." Diamond in the Rough Films praises Grenzfurthner's hosting and storytelling: "This doc works in some very unconventional ways, not the least of which is our plucky protagonist. Grenzfurthner is an absolute charmer as our host and his narration is note-perfect (the accent is so cool in that Werner Herzog kind of way). It's really rare in a documentary about a not-that-famous person where you become almost instantly won-over and invested in their personal journey." Blogger and sci-fiction author Cory Doctorow states about Traceroute that "Johannes is a brilliant lunatic of surpassing and delightful weirdness." MicroFilmmaker Magazine writes: "The different people Grenzfurthner chatted with were genuinely interesting and the organic way he moved from place to place was intriguing. [...] You'll find that you've learned an awful lot about technology, nerdiness, and America."

Richard Propes (The Independent Critic) writes: "It's challenging. It's thought-provoking. It's remarkably honest. It's well researched. [...] If you're expecting nothing more than your usual nerd doc with its cosplay cuteness and asocial gamers, you're going to be not just disappointed but probably traumatized. Grenzfurthner is clearly full-on willing to challenge culture, stereotypes, accepted thoughts and just about everything else. There's a healthy dose of sexuality in Traceroute, which one might expect, yet Grenzfurthner also immerses the film in politics, activism and social shifts. [...] Refreshingly devoid of the pretentiousness so often found amongst truly intellectual films, Traceroute is simultaneously a pretty wonderful personal journey and an immensely satisfying cinematic experience."

=== Awards ===
The film won Best Documentary Feature at the 2016 Phuture Con Festival (Denver, USA/Sapporo, Japan), the Award of Merit for Documentary Feature at the 2016 Accolade Global Film Competition, the award for Best Documentary Feature Film at the 2016 Subversive Film Awards in Los Angeles, the Award of Merit at The Indie Fest Awards in several categories (Documentary Feature, History / Biographical, Tourism / Travel, Contemporary Issues / Awareness Raising) and the Honorable Mention award at The Indie Gathering International Film Festival 2016. It was nominated for the 2016 Austrian Documentary Award (ADA). The hackerspace Voidwarranties in Antwerp, Belgium, awarded Traceroute the title of "Nerd Movie Of The Year 2016". Traceroute is a competition finalist at the 2016 Filmmatic Filmmaker Awards. Diamond In The Rough Film Festival 2016 in Cupertino, California, awarded Traceroute Best Feature Documentary, Celludroid Film Festival 2016 in Cape Town. South Africa, awarded the film Best Documentary and FrackFest 2016 in Oklahoma City, Oklahoma, gave Traceroute the Best of the Fest award and the Best Doc of the Fest award. The film was also a semi-finalist for the Golden Kapok Award at Guangzhou International Documentary Film Festival 2016. Johannes Grenzfurthner's editing was nominated for "Best Editing" at the 2017 Filmplus Festival, Cologne, Germany.

== Sequel ==
In a 2016 interview with Film Threat's Chris Gore, Johannes Grenzfurthner debated the possibility of a sequel, a trip to destinations in Eastern Europe with the goal to drive from Vienna to Baikonur Cosmodrome. Grenzfurthner changed the concept and created Glossary of Broken Dreams (2018), which he considers a loose sequel or follow-up.
