= Glossary of Broken Dreams =

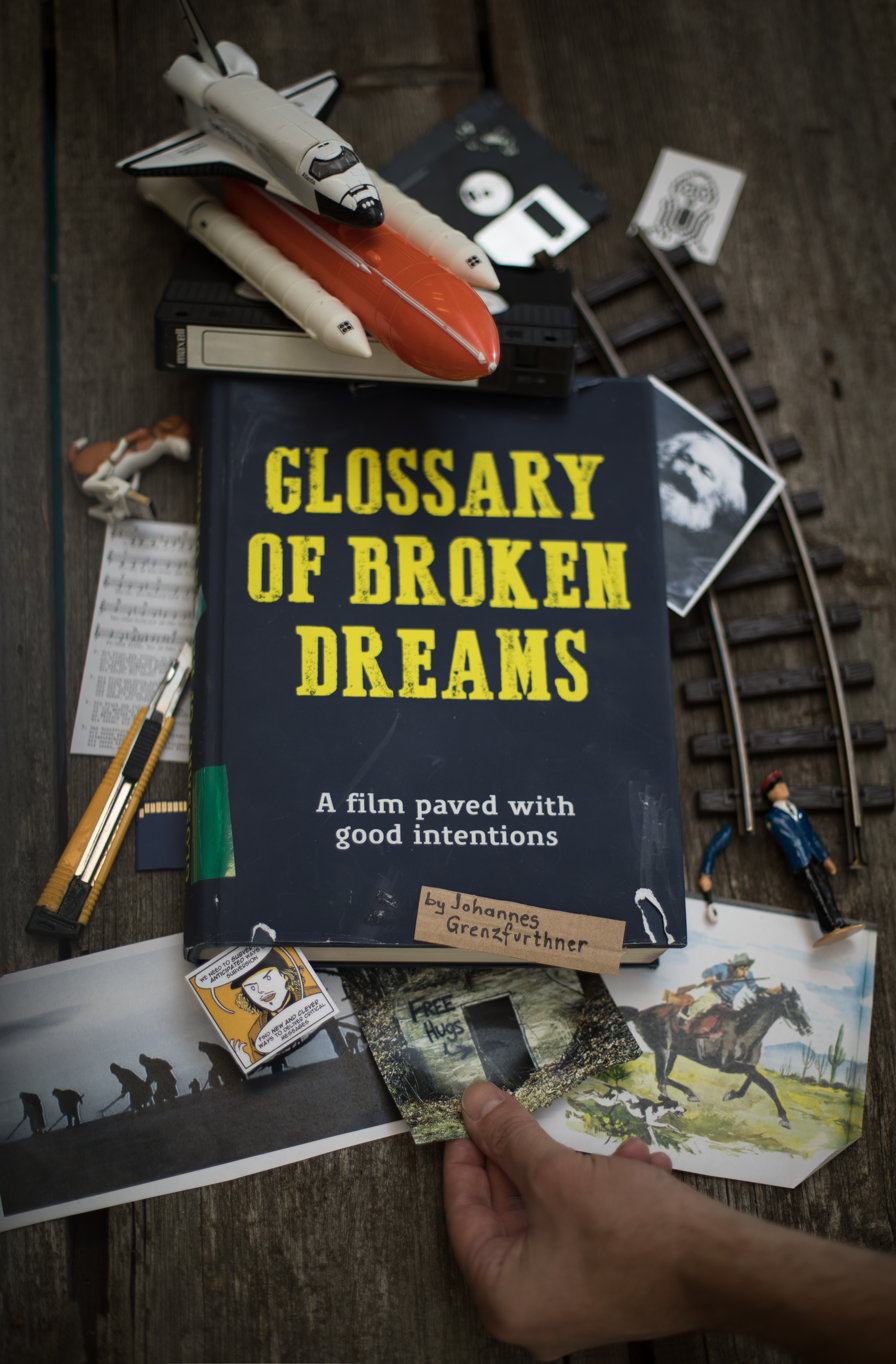
- "Glossary of Broken Dreams", theatrical release poster (2018).
- Directed by: Johannes Grenzfurthner
- Written by: Johannes Grenzfurthner, Ishan Raval
- Produced by: Johannes Grenzfurthner, Guenther Friesinger
- Narrated by: Johannes Grenzfurthner
- Cinematography: Sophia Cacciola, Michael J. Epstein, Johannes Grenzfurthner, Thomas Kranabetter, Tanja Mairhofer, Josef P. Wagner, Thomas Weilguny
- Music by: Michael Donaldson, Inti-Illimani, wobblersound, Kasson Crooker, Duscher&Gratzer, Bottervogel, Christoph Burstup Weiss
- Production company: monochrom
- Distributed by: monochrom
- Release date: March 16, 2018 (Diagonale Film Festival)
- Running time: 98 minutes
- Countries: Austria; United States
- Languages: English; German

Glossary of Broken Dreams is a 2018 Austrian/American documentary film directed by Johannes Grenzfurthner. The essayistic feature film tries to present an overview of political concepts such as freedom, privacy, identity, resistance, etc.

Grenzfurthner calls his project an "ideotaining cinematic revue" about political ideas he considers important. Grenzfurthner cites frustration about the current level of political debate as a primary influence for making the film. He couldn't tolerate "ignorant and topically abusive comments on the 'Internet' anymore." So he teamed up with writer and activist Ishan Raval to "explain, re-evaluate, and sometimes sacrifice political golden calves of discourse."

The film features performances by Amber Benson, Max Grodenchik, Jason Scott Sadofsky and others.

The film was produced by art group monochrom.

== Concept ==
Johannes Grenzfurthner, who defines himself as a 'lumpennerd' in the film's intro, functions as a storyteller and host who guides the viewer through the narrative. Glossary of Broken Dreams does not make use of classic documentary-style interviews and aesthetics. Instead, the film presents different political and philosophical concepts in the form of short films and essayistic chapters featuring fictional characters. These bizarre and exaggerated characters are performed by actors, voice performers and musicians (for example FM4's Hannes Duscher and Roland Gratzer). The film can be seen in the tradition of reflexive documentary films and performative documentary films.

In an interview with Film Threat, Grenzfurthner describes his project as follows:

It's a peculiar film for nerds of a peculiar set of interests, but at the same time it's talking about topics that are so goddamn important that more people should know about it. I guess that's why I made it. No idea if there is even a target audience for it, but one can try. There is a lot to process. And cat meme drunk masses will probably not even scratch the surface. But my idea was: better to challenge the audience than to dumb it down.

The film incorporates art and illustrations by Bonni Rambatan, Matt J. Frith, James Brothwell, Clemens Kindermann, Stevyn Prothero and Steve Reeder in a variety of different cinematic styles. The film thus works as a fast-paced collage, utilizing a singer-songwriter duo, puppet shows, LucasArts-style pixel animation, Japanese anime, live action sequences and stock footage.

Glossary of Broken Dreams can be considered a loose follow-up of Grenzfurthner's first documentary feature Traceroute, but expanding his critique of capitalist (nerd) culture.

The film was produced by Günther Friesinger and Johannes Grenzfurthner, with Michael McEnroe acting as an associate producer.

Austrian and German media personalities such as Stefanie Sargnagel, Gerald Votava, Peter Hörmanseder, Katharina Stemberger and Jolyne Schlien Schürmann make cameo appearances in the film.

=== Chapters ===
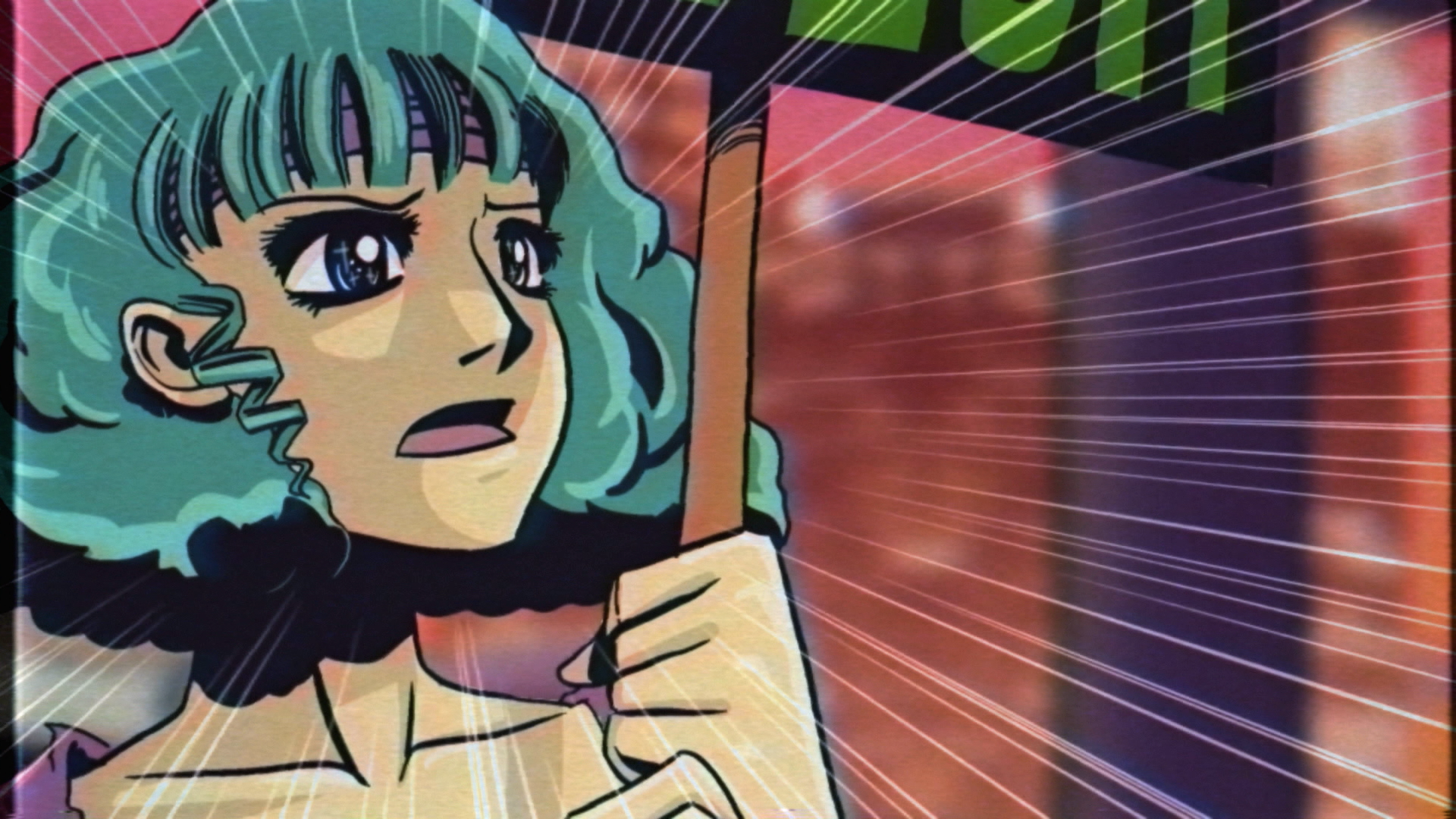
Movie still from chapter 'The Media' ("Glossary of Broken Dreams", 2018).

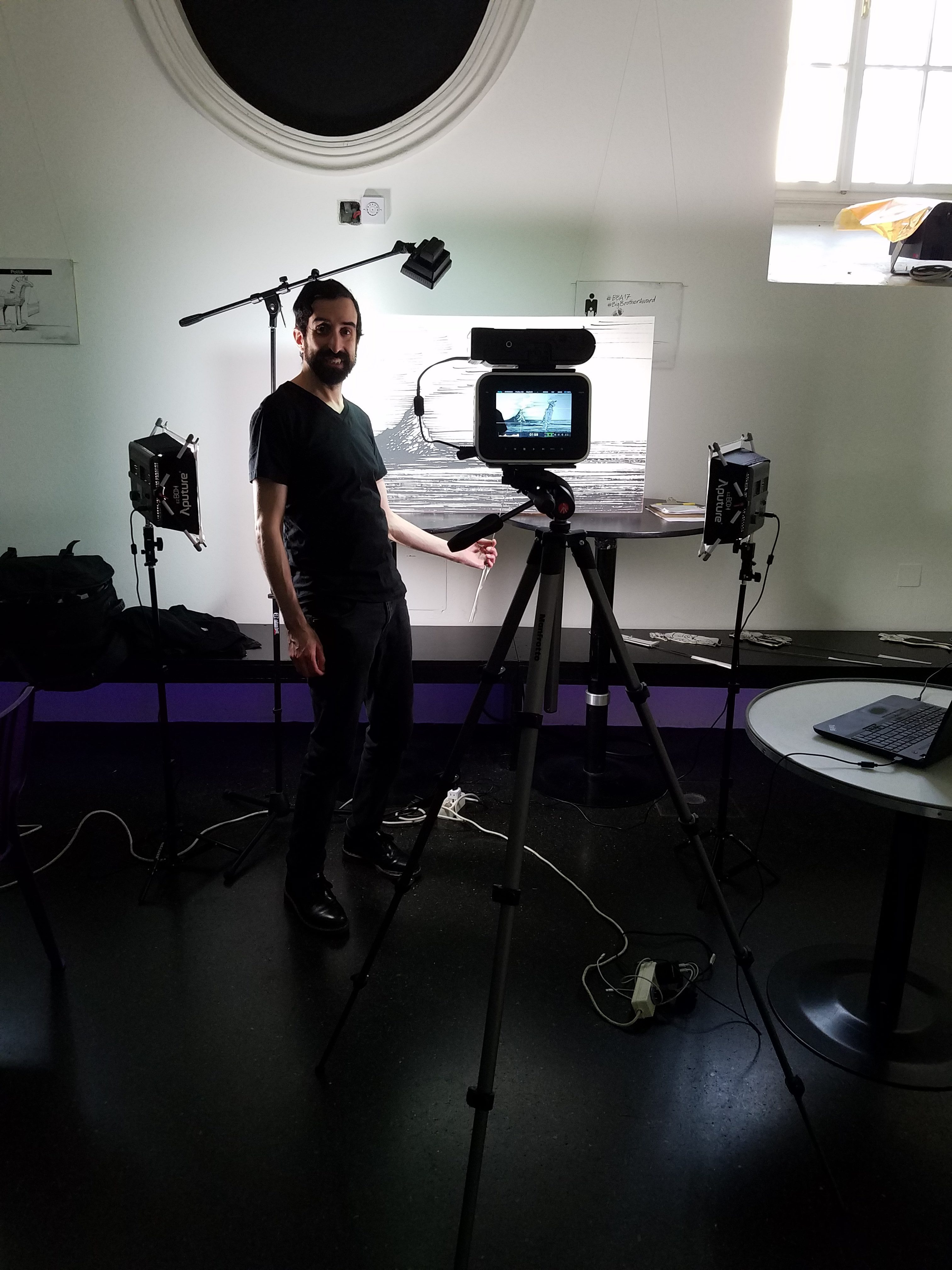
Michael J. Epstein on set of Johannes Grenzfurthner's film "Glossary of Broken Dreams" (November 2018).

Capitalism/Market/Freedom
With Stuart Freeman (as Brian Ewok) and Conny Lee (as Madame Juju)
An introduction to the basic ruleset of capitalist society and its historical formation.

Competition
With Harald Homolka List (as Hans Platzgaumer) and Bronwynn Mertz-Penzinger (as Platzgaumer's Cerebral Cortex)
An analysis of the pros and cons of competitive systems (like capitalism and biological evolution).

Accumulation
With Johannes Grenzfurthner (as Doktor Ullmaier) and Alexander E. Fennon (as bank clerk)
This section demonstrates accumulation of capital in an ironic way by squandering 50 euros in a money exchange office.

Resistance/Activism
With Johannes Grenzfurthner (as Frau Schlammpeitzinger) and Robert Stachel (as Waiter Walter Peckinpah)
A story about the ongoing shift in Western societies from a disciplinary society to a society of control and how this affects subversion in art, politics and activism.

The Media
With Amber Benson (as Pfefferkarree McCormick) and Michael J. Epstein (as DeForest Schbeibi)
An analysis of the function of media in liberal societies (including freedom of speech, fake news and other concepts)

Privacy/Data
With Achmed Abdel-Salam (as Modern Subject) and Jim Libby (as Information Gaze)
This section delves into the co-evolution of privacy as a social value and the bourgeois economy, and critiques the current emphasis on privacy as failing to address underlying dominations in society. It introduces the idea, explored later in the film ("The Left"), of how computation and information could be liberatory under different property relations.

Nature Vs Nurture
With David Fine (as Pansexual German Paratrooper)
This story of a chimpanzee debates social conditioning.

Politics/Identity
With Andrea Nitsche (as Dr. Bulletpoint von Sganarelle) and Michael Smulik (as Politics)
A critique of the preponderance of politics today, predicated on identity, in contrast to a universalist approach to politics.

Democracy/Social Democracy
With Jeff Ricketts (as President Ödem von Horvath), Max Grodénchik (as Biological Male) and Kudra Owens (as Biological Female
The section questions the viability of social democracy in a globalized and financialized post-Fordist economy.

The Left
With Martin Auer (as Professor Alain Xavior Schnürlsamt), Johannes Grenzfurthner (as Harnulf Rohrkrepierer), David Dempsey (as Sven Shitpornson), Anna Behne (as Lady Unsquaredance), Jason Scott Sadofsky (as Billy Bob Turingengine) and Franz Ablinger (as Sailor Dieselfink)
Looking at the Left's inability to think or move past twentieth-century tactics, affects and campaigns, this section questions, ultimately, whether the correct course of action today might just be to give up on the Left, and try something better, more attuned to the possibilities and needs of the times.

== Production ==
=== Process ===
I just thought it was time for something like a political spring cleaning of concepts. Because picking up the broom and taking a chance to get rid of stuff is the only way to prevent us all from becoming social liberal hoarders. One of my examples is the concept of privacy that, at the moment, everyone coddles like a puppy. Let me say this, as a good old Neo-leftist, I'm having problems with the conservative and deeply bourgeois can of worms that the privacy debate entails. I think it's time to change our thought patterns here. Instead of trying to find ways to defend our privacy come hell or high water, we should ask ourselves why privacy is such a major concern for us? Is what we're trying to achieve here just reformist symptom-control rather than a solution to the underlying problems?
— Johannes Grenzfurthner about his motivations to create the film

The basic script was written by Johannes Grenzfurthner and Ishan Raval, supported by language consultant Chris S. Sims.

Due to the fast production process, the different chapters were written while other parts were already being shot and edited. Final decisions about length and content were made in the editing room.

On the basis of [the theoretical texts], I went on to develop the characters and the plot of the movie and started filming with the actors. At the same time, I was cutting scenes that were finished and started to put the movie timeline together. Everything was happening simultaneously. Compiling, writing, filming, cutting. And sometimes not even in this order. It felt like creating a jigsaw puzzle and trying to solve it at the same time. But in a short time – the production took about 5 months – it was doable without losing track completely.

Principal photography commenced August 4, 2017, and ended November 14, 2017. The film was completed on January 2, 2018.

With a budget of US$15,000, the film can be considered microfilmmaking and guerrilla filmmaking. In an interview with futurezone, Grenzfurthner called the making of the film an ongoing process of "radical DIY". He worked with different teams of people on different chapters, for example LA-based filmmakers Sophia Cacciola and Michael J. Epstein, who were visiting Vienna for an art residency with monochrom at Museumsquartier.

The film's main language is English, but features various musical interludes by Duscher&Gratzer and other music groups, performed in German.

=== Sound design ===
Daniel Hasibar created the sound design and audioscape underlying Grenzfurthner's narration.

== Music ==
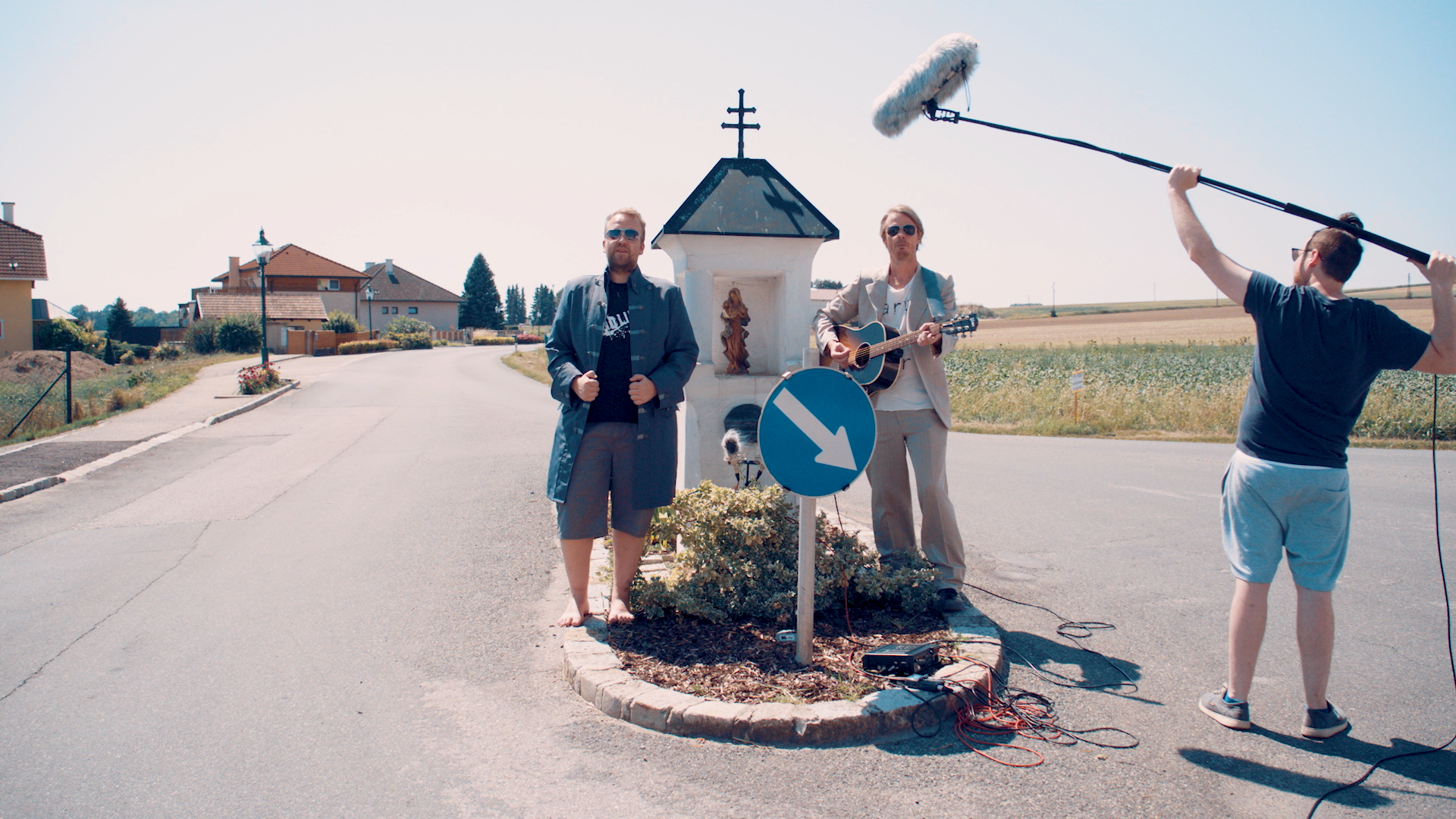
Roland Gratzer and Hannes Duscher, performing a song in "Glossary of Broken Dreams" (2018).

The film features music by Michael Donaldson, Inti-Illimani, wobblersound, Kasson Crooker, Duscher&Gratzer, Bottervogel, Christoph Burstup Weiss, among others.

== Distribution ==
The film's world premiere took place at Diagonale Film Festival in Graz, Austria on March 16, 2018. The festival called it a "popcultural wholesale assault". The North American premiere took place at Vermont International Film Festival on April 11, 2018.

Grenzfurthner has a proactive approach to peer-to-peer file sharing. In his interview with Boing Boing he mentions that he put donation info into the film, anticipating its appearance on torrent sites.

The film was released on January 31, 2019 on Vimeo on Demand and can be bought or rented.

== Reception ==
=== Critical response ===
Boing Boing says about the film: "Produced with a micro-budget, this monumental mosaic is taking the audience on a ride through an encyclopedia of overused, misconceived, and corrupted concepts and ideas. The fact that it concerns the favorite vocabulary of current discourses, the golden calves of contemporary controversy, makes for a considerably explosive force." Austrian pop culture magazine Skug calls the film "a swan song to the society of ignorance.".

The Independent Critic's Richard Propes states that "Glossary of Broken Dreams is a nerdgasm of creative consciousness meets good intentions and abundant doses of intellectually informed human compassion. It'll fuck with your mind. Then laugh." Film Threat's Bradley Gibson says that it's "aggressive, doesn't pull punches, and burns through ideas at machine-gun rate ... 97 head-spinning minutes of core dump rage and frustration that is also entertaining and witty."

Austrian magazine Profil calls it "a brilliant feat". Gaming and film website Press Play says that "sometimes it feels as if the entire content of Wikipedia would be rammed into your brain with a USB stick." ScreenCritix (UK) writes: "Grenzfurthner is our guide through a political minefield, giving us his notes like an angry chorus from the ancient Greek and Shakespearean plays ... an unmethodical survey of a gargantuan topic."

CelebBeat writes: "The movie delivered on many more levels than I expected possible. It has the potential to break into echo chambers and filter bubbles; it can empower people by providing them with a deeper understanding of the human condition." "It's really hard to deny the expert way this movie was pieced together. It's a mix and match party of epic proportions. Old school video game graphics. Puppets. Musicians, anime, the kitchen sink. There's no shortage of style but more importantly, somehow these things all co-exist in seemingly perfect harmony." RDTB says: "If Slavoj Zizek would create Kinder Surprise Eggs, this film would be in them." UK Film Review's Annie Vincent says about the film: "A highly intelligent and topical film, Glossary of Broken Dreams is an engaging epistemological documentary that will have you chuckling about, choking on, and considering the validity of, your political ideology." MicroFilmmaker Magazine likes the "uncompromising attitude" and "unique taste", but questions the experimental nature of the film and its accessibility: "No real-world interviews were conducted on camera, which surprised me since these are the bread and butter of many documentaries. ... Is it a narrative film? Is it a documentary? Is it both?"

Film Inquiry gave a negative review and called the film an "exhausting, maddening experience" while The 405's Ana Leorne states: "Glossary of Broken Dreams would be a proper commedia if it weren't so tragic — and yet it cleverly plays with both classifications, either juxtaposing or simply interchanging them, thus contributing to the ultimate proof of the non-existence of binaries."

In the September 2018 issue of Ray Kinomagazin, Oliver Stangl gives the film a positive review and calls it "a crazy survey of the present situation".

=== Awards ===
The film won the Award of Merit for Feature Film at the 2018 Accolade Global Film Competition and for Documentary Feature at the 2018 IndieFest. It won Best Experimental Film at the 2018 Subversive Cinema Awards, won Best Feature Documentary Foreign at the 2018 Indie Gathering Awards, won Best Hacker Film at the 2018 HOPE Conference, won the Award of Merit for Feature Documentary at the 2018 Impact Doc Awards, and won the main award (Best Feature Length Film) at the Austrian Film Festival Awards 2018.
