= Sockington =

Domestic cat internet celebrity

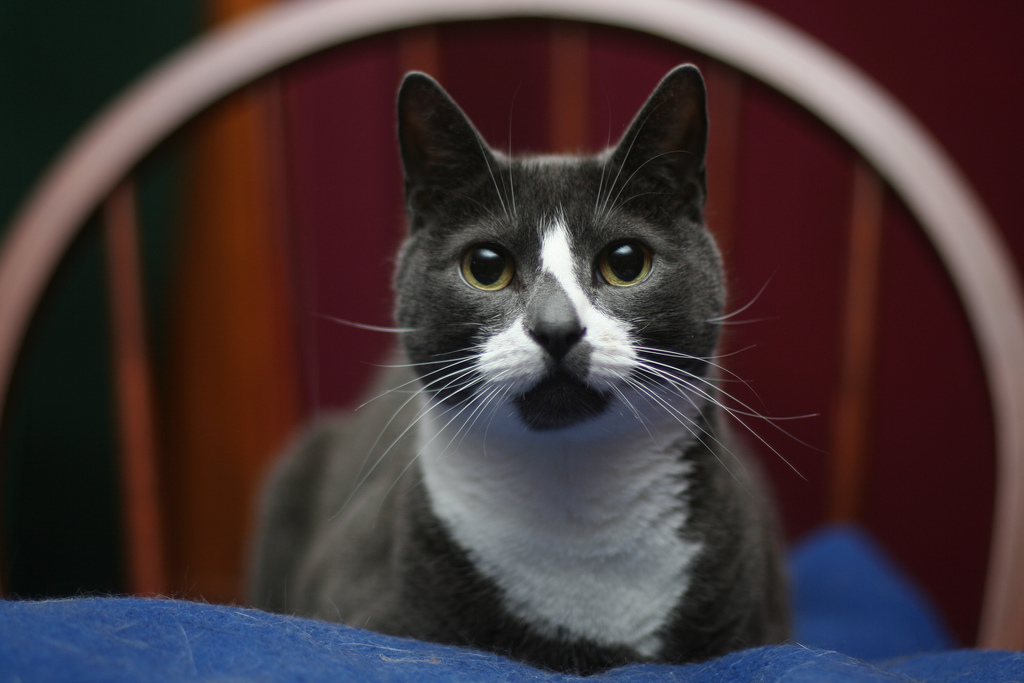
- Sockington in 2009
- Other names: Sockamillion, Socks
- Species: Felis catus
- Breed: Domestic short-haired
- Sex: Male
- Died: July 18, 2022
- Occupation: Pet
- Known for: Twitter account
- Owner: Jason Scott
- Residence: Waltham, Massachusetts
- Appearance: Grey and white

Sockington (also known as "Sockamillion" or "Socks") was a domestic cat who lived in Waltham, Massachusetts, United States. He gained large-scale fame via the social networking site Twitter; his co-owner, Jason Scott, an archivist and Internet historian, regularly posted from Sockington's Twitter account since late 2007. As of July 2018, Sockington's account had over 1.2 million followers, many of which were pet accounts themselves.

Sockington was a grey and white domestic shorthaired cat; he was found as a stray outside a Boston subway station in 2004.

In July 2014, Parade magazine called Sockington a "Pet Power Player" and named him #1 in their list of pet social media sensations.

Sockington died on July 18, 2022.

== Twitter fame ==
The posts, or "tweets", were written by Scott from the perspective of Sockington. Typical posts run along the lines of:

stalk stalk stalk AND WHAT HAVE WE HERE deadly pillow enemy BANZAIIIIIIIII CRASH oh no busted PILLOW ATTACKED FIRST run run run

The posts were written a few at a time using a shell script and slowly fed into Twitter at short intervals.

Between 2007 and January 2009, the Sockington account grew to 10,000 followers. In February 2009, the Sockington account was added to the "recommended feeds" list of Twitter, making it one of the accounts suggested to all new users who joined. This caused a rapid expansion of the account at the rate of between 500 and 5,000 new followers a day. By May 2009 the account had half a million followers, which led British newspaper The Independent to call him "Twitter's latest megastar". In July the number was over three-quarters of a million. In August 2009, that number surpassed 1 million. As of May 2010, Sockington had over 1.5 million watchers, making him the most popular nonhuman tweeter, being the 98th most popular Twitter feed.

Sockington had two feline companions whose Twitter voices were also provided by Jason Scott: the ginger Pennycat (aka Pennsylvania) whose posts tended to reflect ironically on Sockington and his fame, and the other, Tweetie, a rescue cat who looked enough like Sockington to be nicknamed his "Sockelganger" (a portmanteau of Sockington and doppelgänger). Tweetie's tale of rescue effectively brought attention to the plight of feral cats and provided an opportunity for fund-raising for The Animal Center in Newtown, Connecticut (United States), the shelter that saved him. "Food Lady", the woman responsible for the cats' maintenance and welfare... not to mention kibble, also has a Twitter presence.

== Reception ==
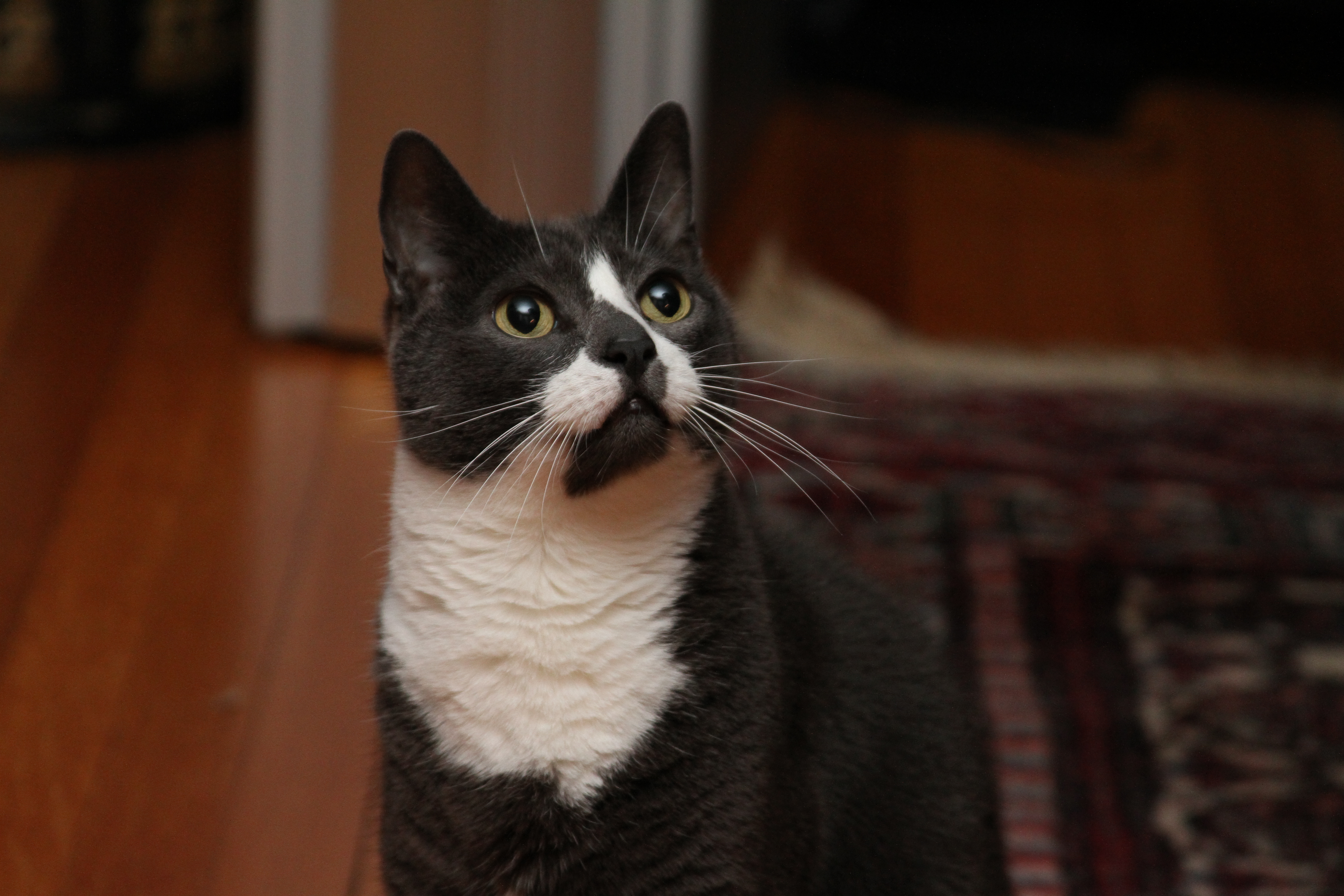
Sockington

The MSNBC news site characterized Sockington's posts to be a parody of Twitter's "online time-wasters", while Scott himself said the account shows up the low possibility of financial profit from Twitter: "Everybody wants this social media bubble. They want something where we're all chattering so much that we all get rich. This cat makes everybody look like fools because he's got hundreds of thousands of followers. And he doesn't tend to follow anyone but other animals." Mary Ullmer of The Grand Rapids Press called the tweets by Sockington "hilarious" and described the phenomenon as "Garfield goes 21st century".

Sockington's account was recommended to people joining Twitter in the "Suggested User List". Scott had offers to commercialize Sockington, and sold Sockington T-shirts. At one time, he said he may accept one or more offers to offset his personal debts. In a May 2009 interview, Scott emphasized the deliberate lightheartedness of the Sockington updates and pages. "People have come asking Socks to endorse products or speak about causes...what does a cat have to do with the war in Darfur?" On June 22, 2009, Scott created a "SocksArmy" account on Twitter, to allow for announcing causes and calls for charity. On October 25, 2009, Jason Scott announced Sockington would not be endorsing products or "selling out" (defined as being paid to change the nature of Sockington; he still indicated plans for a Sockington book and continued selling Sockington T-shirts).

== See also ==
- List of individual cats
