= Get Lamp =

2010 film by Jason Scott

- Title screen
- Directed by: Jason Scott
- Produced by: Jason Scott
- Release date: July 2010
- Country: United States
- Language: English

Get Lamp is a documentary about interactive fiction (a genre that includes text adventures) filmed by computer historian Jason Scott of textfiles.com. Scott conducted the interviews between February 2006 and February 2008, and the documentary was released in July 2010.

== Description ==
The documentary and its hours of episodes and bonus footage contain material from roughly 80 interviews of interactive fiction developers, designers, and players. Included in the bonus footage is a nearly 50-minute documentary about Infocom, the best-known commercial publisher of interactive fiction. The DVD release included photographs, essays, and a collectible coin.

Get Lamp is licensed under the Creative Commons Attribution-Sharealike-Noncommercial license.

Raw interview footage is hosted at the Internet Archive.

The name "Get Lamp" comes from the first inventory pickup in arguably the first-ever adventure game, Will Crowther's Colossal Cave Adventure (1975), more commonly known as simply Adventure. The lamp appears as a kind of Easter Egg in nearly every interview. The film starts off with a tour of part of the real-life Mammoth Cave system in Kentucky that Adventure was based on. The soundtrack includes Creative Commons-licensed work from Zoë Blade (who started out writing Amiga .MOD files) and Tony Longworth.

== Reception ==
Jeremy Reiner of Ars Technica called it "a gem of a film": "The documentary's peek into the culture of Infocom is one of the most fascinating stories I've seen in all of high technology." Gordon Haff of CNET said it "does a great job of capturing a gaming era which is ultimately hard to separate from the history of Infocom." In The Guardian, Will Freeman listed it among "Six of the Best Gaming Documentaries": "It is a low-fi doc prone to the sentimental, but takes the viewer on a journey through a world of gaming all too often forgotten now that Call of Duty and Angry Birds are household names."

== Gallery ==
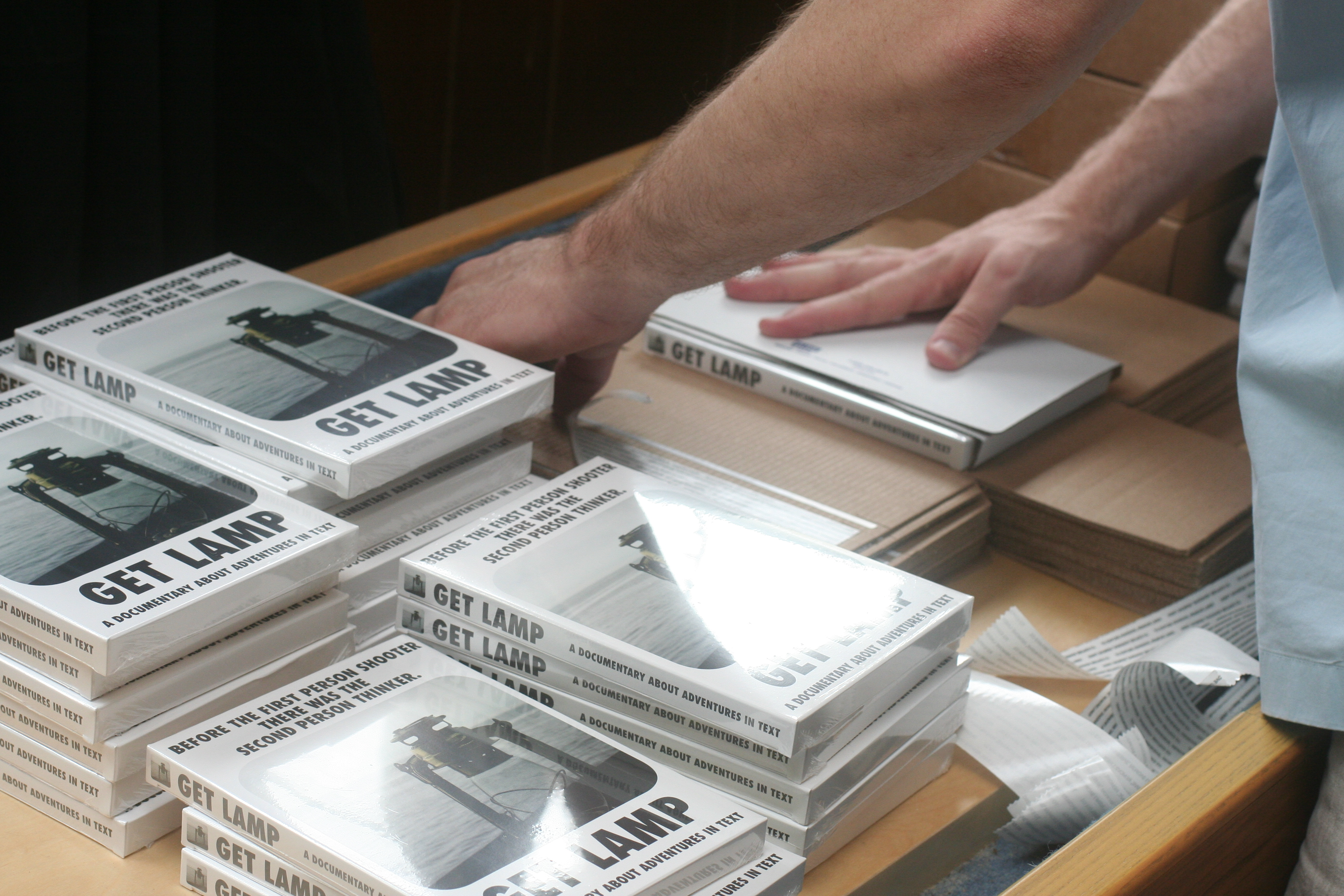
Get Lamp cases

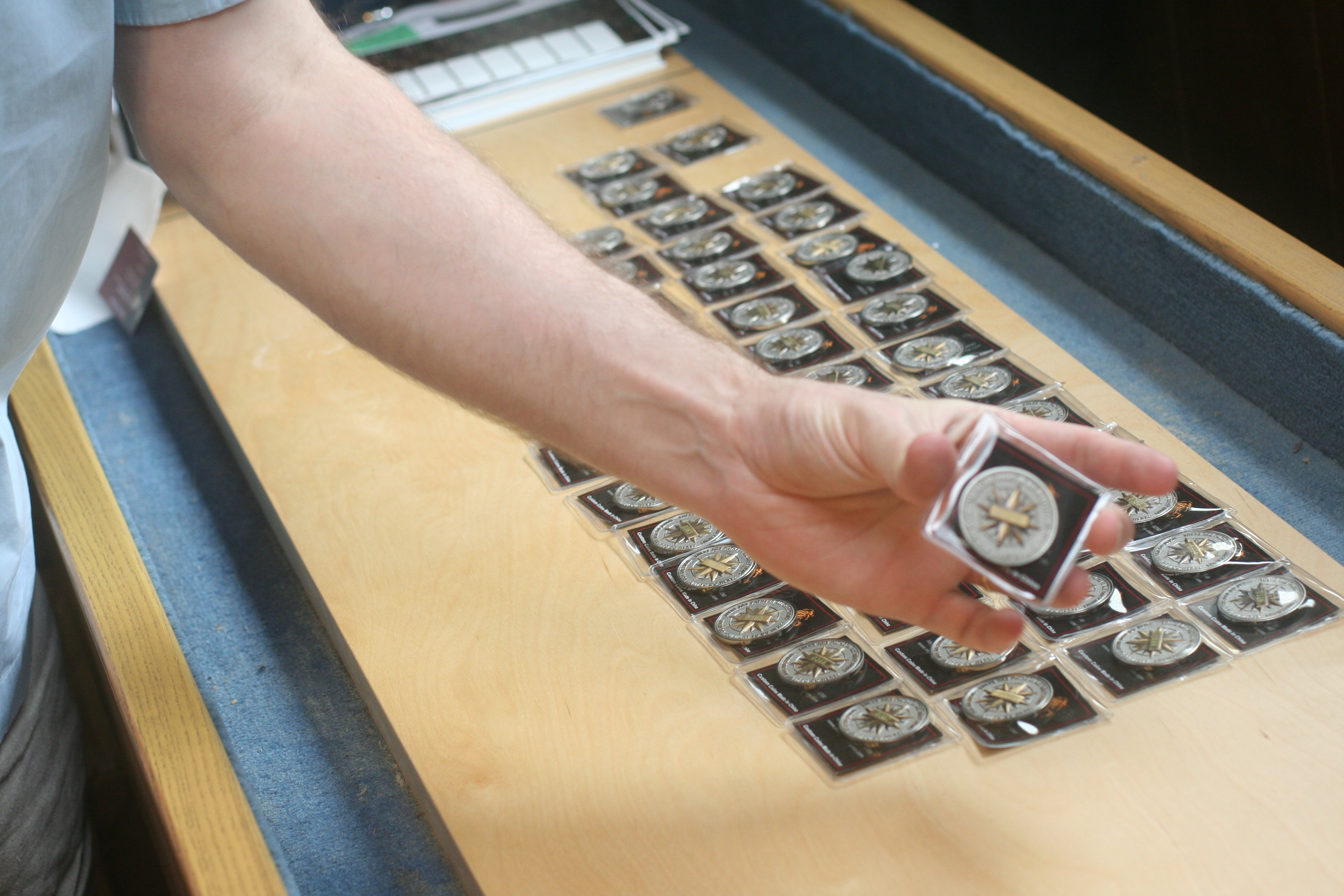
Get Lamp coins

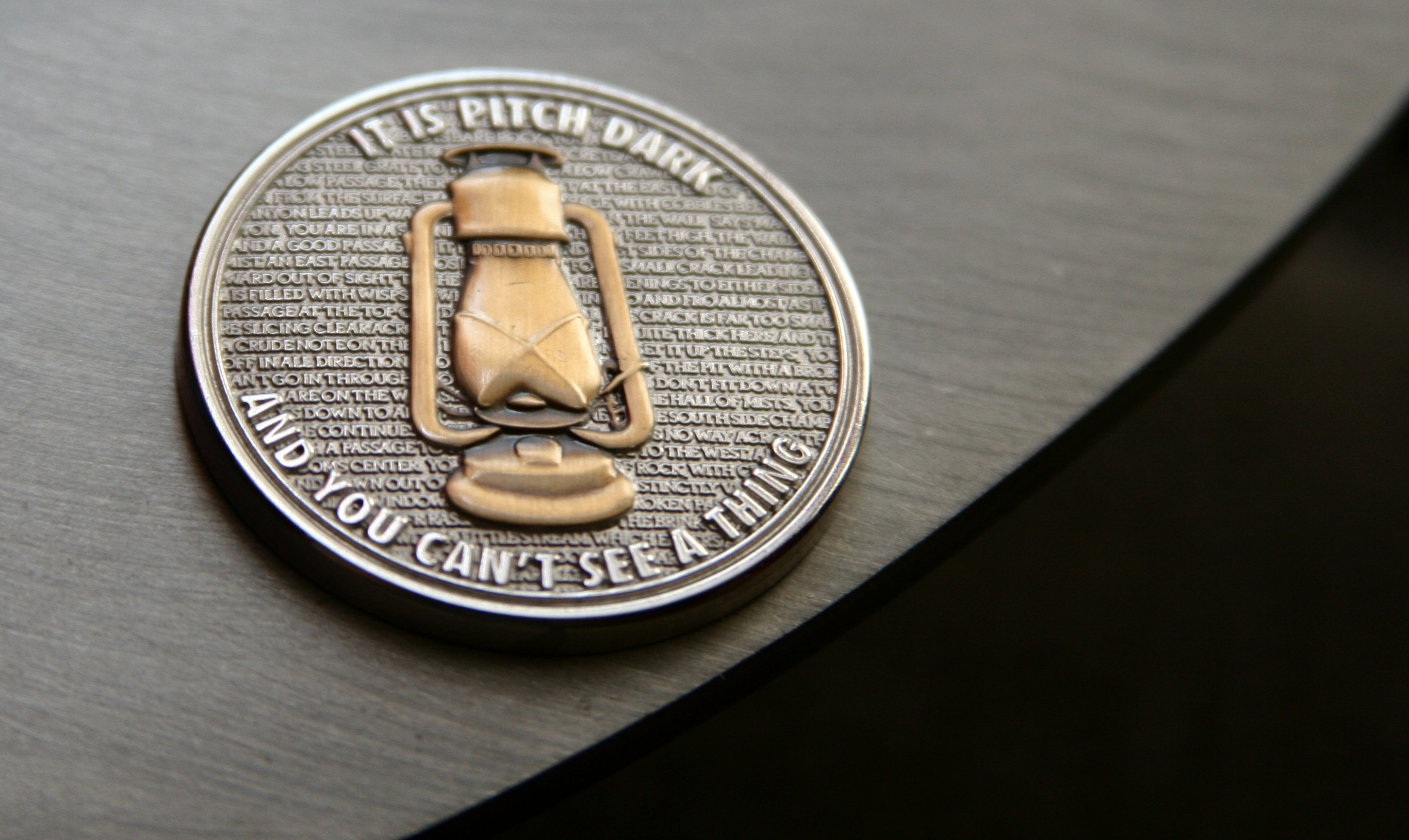
Near view of a Lamp coin

== See also ==
- Mary Ann Buckles
- Steve Meretzky
- Scott Adams (game designer)
