= Mary Ann Buckles =

Early american video game researcher

Mary Ann Buckles is widely credited as the first academic to research and speculate about the emotional and cultural impact of videogames.

Buckles' dissertation, "Interactive Fiction: The Computer Storygame ‘Adventure’", gained attention twenty years after Buckles presented it to the department of German literature at the University of California, San Diego. Espen Aarseth, a researcher based in Copenhagen, is credited with raising the profile of Buckles' dissertation, which Aarseth quotes frequently from in his own book, Cybertext: Perspectives on Ergodic Literature.

Buckles left academia after completing her dissertation in 1985, writing one article for Byte Magazine about interactive fiction as literature in 1987, which was based on her dissertation. In it, she discusses how interactive fiction games such as Adventure can have deeper meanings for players, partially because they are responsible for making the choices, and partially because unlike linear printed texts, the number of possible variations on the "story" are quite large.

Buckles received her Ph.D. from the University of California at San Diego. in 1985. Her thesis was titled “Interactive Fiction: The Computer Storygame Adventure”; she felt strongly that these games would change our relationship to computers. Her dissertation board had members dead set against such a frivolous subject; she fought them the whole way, and now her thesis is very often cited in academic works on video games. As of 2006, she works as a massage therapist in San Diego, California and was interviewed for the interactive fiction documentary, Get Lamp. She is married to her husband, Jack, a computational biologist.

== See also ==
- Get Lamp
