= Soviet Unterzoegersdorf =

Video game and fictional country

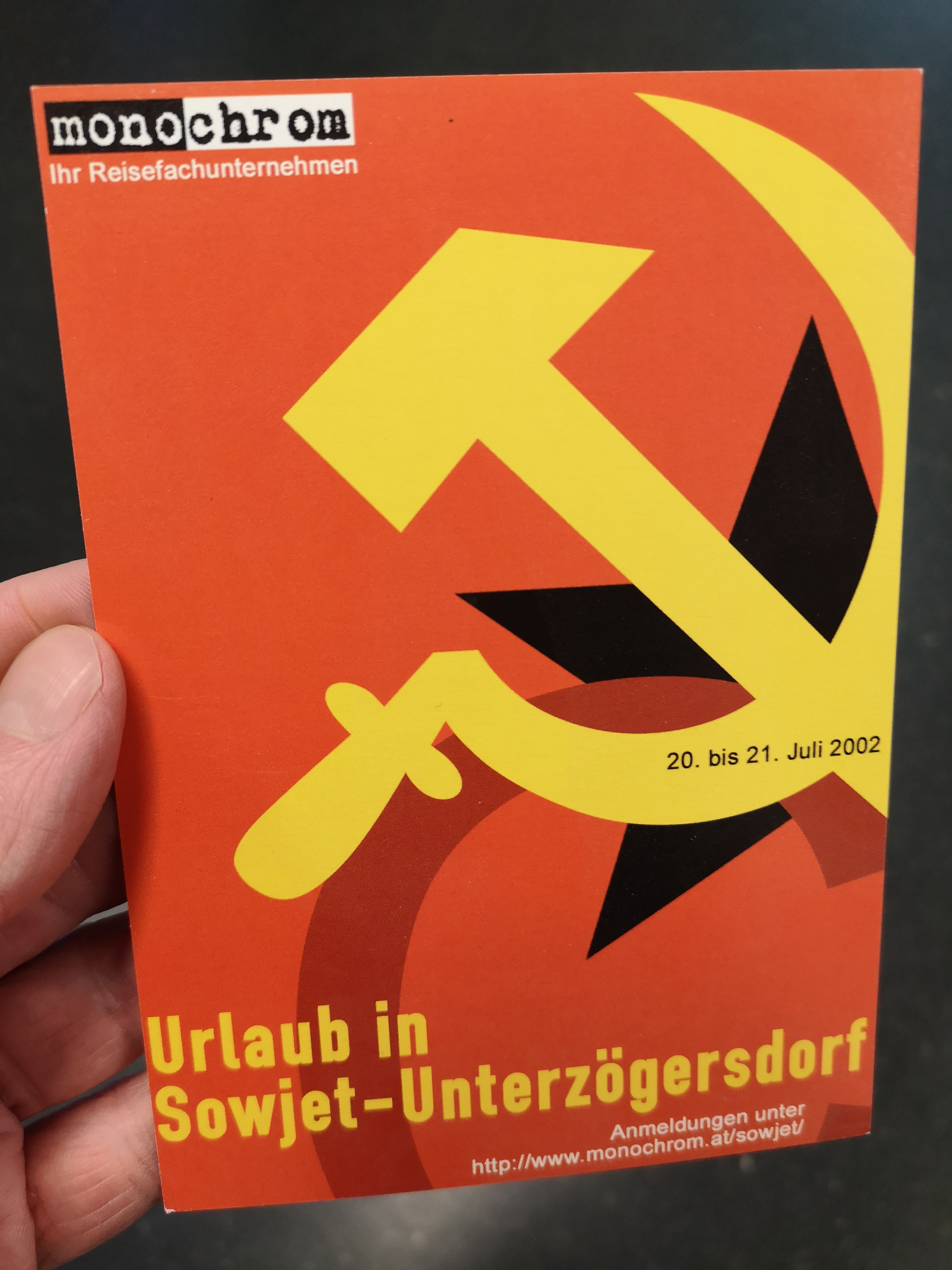
Flyer for "Vacation in Soviet Unterzoegersdorf" (a 2002 performance about the 55th anniversary of the Communist Party of Soviet Unterzoegersdorf)

Soviet Unterzoegersdorf (German: Sowjet-Unterzögersdorf) is a fictitious country created by the art/technology/theory group Monochrom. It is the "last existing appanage republic of the USSR", located inside the Republic of Austria.

== Background ==
Soviet Unterzoegersdorf is partially based on an existing village well known to Johannes Grenzfurthner, the creator of the concept. As a child and teenager, Grenzfurthner spent a lot of time at his grandparents' farm in the small village of Unterzögersdorf (a cadastral municipality of Stockerau). His grandparents' stories about Nazism, WWII and the Soviet occupation in Allied-occupied Austria (1945–1955) form the inspirational basis of the long-term project Soviet Unterzoegersdorf.

In the early 2000s, notorious Austrian art group Monochrom decided to have a little fun with the spirit of Ostalgie (nostalgia for the Soviet era), the cultural whiplash from the sudden collapse of the Soviet Union a decade earlier. Monochrom founder Johannes Grenzfurthner, having been born well after the USSR ceded East Austria in 1955, realized he knew nothing about the Soviet occupation of his hometown, the tiny rural hamlet of Unterzoegersdorf, aside from the hyperbolic, implausibly demonic stories his grandmother had told him when he was young. He was curious about that era, but the older generation was unwilling to talk. (Considering the shame of Anschluss followed by ten years of Soviet annexation, could anyone blame them? As Grenzfurthner himself put it, "We Austrians are known for two things: Classical music and mass murder.") Leave the past behind, they said. No one wants to remember Soviet Unterzoegersdorf.

Debates triggered by postmodern culture have directed Monochrom's attention towards questions of representation and relevance of "history" and stories. With Soviet Unterzoegersdorf, a fictitious and misplaced handling of the past and the present is being discussed and put to use. In this regard, the project is also taking part in the production as well as the criticism of cultural and collective memories.

== Projects ==
Monochrom transformed the basic theoretical concept into various projects (LARPs, computer games, short films, performances).

=== Short film (1999) ===
A short film ("Der Installateur (bis 14:28)") about a plumber trying to cross the border of Soviet Unterzoegersdorf to repair a nuclear warm-water boiler.

=== Public theatre performances (2001 and 2002) ===
In 2001, ten years after the end of the Soviet Union, Monochrom transformed the theoretical concept into an improvisational theatre/performance/LARP that lasted for a couple of days. They organized bus tours from Vienna to Unterzoegersdorf—a small Lower Austrian village that really exists—and acted the setting; beginning with the harsh EU Schengen border control.

In 2002 they staged the 55th anniversary of the Communist Party of Soviet Unterzoegersdorf (CPSUZOeD). Among other things Monochrom presented a computer called "Hyper Hegel" that was powered with burning wood and that would only run a low-tech version of Tetris. Later "Hyper Hegel" was presented as an art installation in exhibitions.

=== Computer game series (2005–) ===
Soviet Unterzoegersdorf
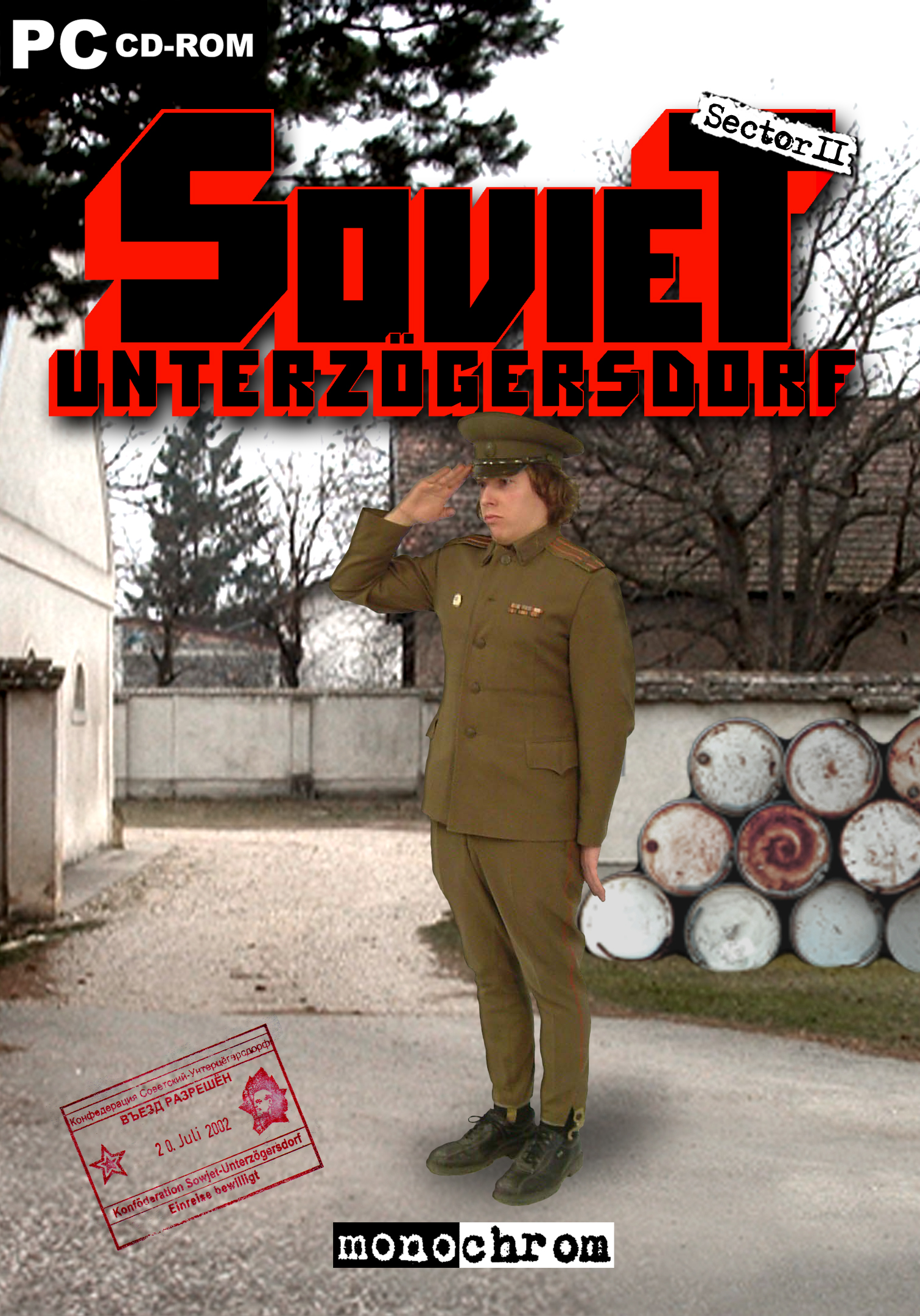
- Monochrom's "Soviet Unterzoegersdorf: Sector II" game cover (2009)
- Developer: Monochrom
- Engine: Adventure Game Studio (AGS)
- Platforms: Windows, Mac OS X, Linux
- Genre: Adventure

==== Soviet Unterzoegersdorf: Sector I ====
In 2005 Monochrom presented the first part of a computer game trilogy: "Soviet Unterzoegersdorf – The Adventure Game" (using AGS). To Monochrom it was clear that the adventure game would provide the perfect media platform to communicate the idea of Soviet Unterzoegersdorf.

The first part of the game was very popular and was well received in the media. The game magazine Edge chose the game as their 'internet game of the month' of November 2005. The back story of the adventure game series features the really existing Tumulus of Unterzoegersdorf.

==== Soviet Unterzoegersdorf: Sector II ====
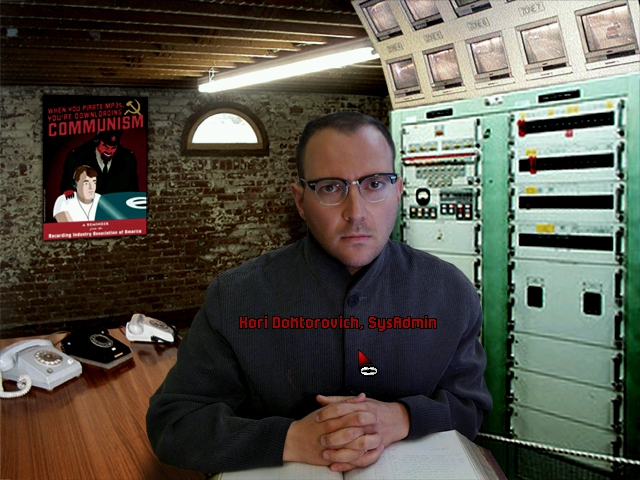
Cory Doctorow as character in Monochrom's adventure game "Soviet Unterzoegersdorf: Sector 2" (2009)

Soviet Unterzoegersdorf: Sector II was presented on December 28, 2008, at the 25th Chaos Communication Congress in Berlin. The game features special guest appearances of Cory Doctorow, Bruce Sterling, Jello Biafra, Jason Scott, Bre Pettis and MC Frontalot. The game was released in March 2009 in San Francisco.

=== Interventions (2008–) ===
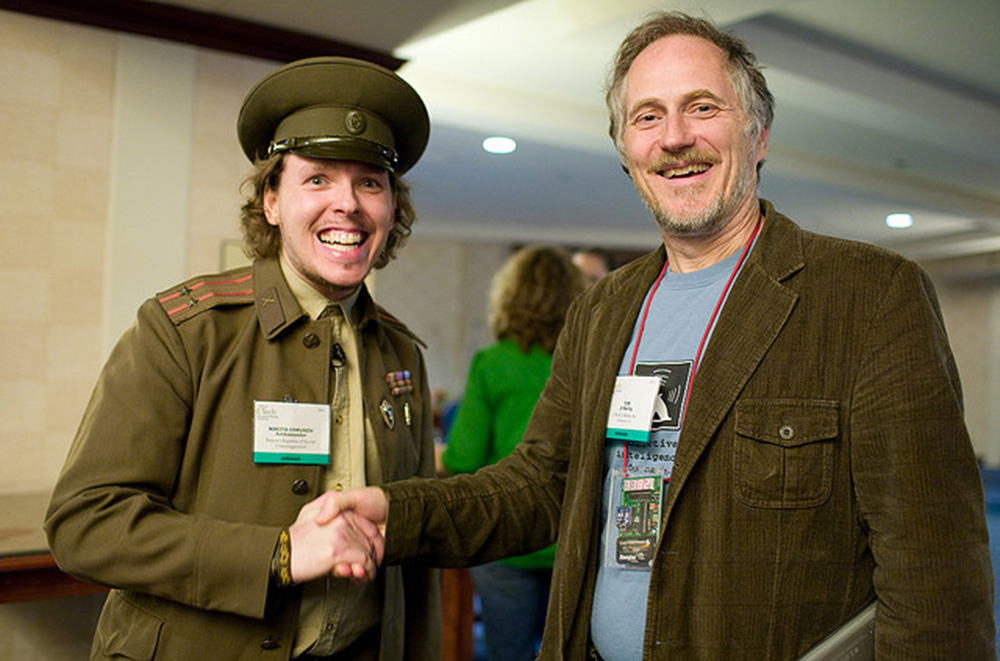
Johannes Grenzfurthner (as "His Excellency Ambassador of Soviet Unterzoegersdorf, Nikita Chrusov") and Tim O'Reilly at O'Reilly Emerging Technology Conference, 2008

In 2008, Monochrom staged a couple of public appearances of "His Excellency Ambassador of Soviet Unterzoegersdorf, Nikita Chrusov" in the United States. The "Ambassador" (played by Monochrom member Johannes Grenzfurthner) visited a corporate afterparty of Disney.com at the Marriott Hotel in San Diego (part of O'Reilly Emerging Technology Conference). He wanted to talk to executives about "the sugar-coated bullets" the corporation is firing at "his country" and other concepts of "cultural imperialism". The "Ambassador" got expelled from the party by Disney personnel.

On September 11, 2009, the "Soviet Unterzoegersdorf Intelligence Corps" released a press statement referring to a pretty detailed list of Austrian civilian and military air traffic frequencies and recordings of two embarrassing conversations on Austrian police radio.

=== Film ===
==== Sierra Zulu project (2011–) ====
Monochrom announced on September 12, 2011, that they are working on a feature-length film that is set in the universe of Soviet Unterzoegersdorf. They are collaborating with the Austrian film production company Golden Girls Filmproduktion. Johannes Grenzfurthner gave a presentation at TEDxVienna about the project.

On February 4, 2012, Monochrom and Golden Girls Filmproduktion premiered the 16-minute short film "Earthmoving". It is a prequel to the feature film Sierra Zulu and features actors Jeff Ricketts, Martin Auer, Lynsey Thurgar, Adrienne Ferguson and Alexander Fennon.

==== 73rd Communique of the CPSUZOeD (2020) ====
Johannes Grenzfurthner presented, as Nikita P. Chrusov, Soviet Unterzoegersdorf's official statement about the Severe acute respiratory syndrome coronavirus 2 pandemic. The short film was presented by Der Standard and at the B3 Biennial of the Moving Image in Frankfurt, Germany.

=== Side projects ===
Monochrom created a series of video spots for Boing Boing Video, dealing with a mysterious packages full of Cheetos. The series is set in the alternative universe of Soviet Unterzoegersdorf.
