= Solvent (film) =

2024 Austrian horror film

- Directed by: Johannes Grenzfurthner
- Written by: Johannes Grenzfurthner; Benjamin Roberts
- Produced by: Jasmin Hagendorfer; Julianne Gabert; Günther Friesinger; Johannes Grenzfurthner
- Starring: Jon Gries; Aleksandra Cwen; Johannes Grenzfurthner; Roland Gratzer
- Cinematography: Florian Hofer
- Edited by: Anton Paievski
- Music by: Pieter de Graaf
- Production company: monochrom OG
- Distributed by: Film Movement (United States and Canada)
- Release date: 26 September 2024 (Slash Filmfestival)
- Running time: 94 minutes
- Country: Austria
- Languages: English; German

Solvent is a 2024 Austrian found footage horror film directed by Johannes Grenzfurthner, who co-wrote the screenplay with Benjamin Roberts. It stars Jon Gries, Aleksandra Cwen, Grenzfurthner and Roland Gratzer.

== Plot ==
Solvent follows an American man searching for Nazi documents in an abandoned Austrian farmhouse, where he discovers a hidden cellar. The film deals with the legacy of Nazism and body horror.

=== Cast ===
- Jon Gries as Gunner S. Holbrook
- Aleksandra Cwen as Dr. Krystyna Szczepanska
- Johannes Grenzfurthner as Ernst Bartholdi
- Roland Gratzer as Fredi Weinhappl
- Jasmin Hagendorfer as Cornelia Dunzinger / Cousine Edith
- Ronald von den Sternen as Richie Fischvogt
- Peter Plos (physical performance) and Galen Howard (voice) as Kyle Edward Boll
- Bibiane Zimba as Leni
- Sky Elobar as Mike Haneke
- Otto Zucker (archival material) as Wolfgang Zinggl
- Jello Biafra appears in a cameo.

== Background ==
Monochrom's earlier project Nazi Petting Zoo and its 2024 film Solvent address Austria's Nazi past and the Holocaust. Grenzfurthner said that the idea for the film came partly from the silence in Austrian families about what their relatives had done during the war.

Solvent is the third part of a horror trilogy, after Masking Threshold (2021) and Razzennest (2022).

== Production ==
Grenzfurthner and Benjamin Roberts wrote the screenplay, with Florian Hofer serving as cinematographer, Anton Paievski as editor and Pieter de Graaf as composer. The film was produced by monochrom OG.

Most of the film was shot at the former farmhouse of Grenzfurthner's grandparents in Unterzögersdorf, Lower Austria. His grandfather, Otto Zucker, a local ÖVP councillor whom Grenzfurthner described as not actually a Nazi, appears in the film as a Nazi demon. In an interview with the Hannoversche Allgemeine Zeitung, Grenzfurthner said that Zucker had given him permission to use his photographs and farmhouse in future art projects and films after his death.

Gries recorded Holbrook's dialogue in a studio in Thailand, with Grenzfurthner directing him remotely via Zoom, rather than on the Austrian set.

The film uses wide-angle photography, special effects and lighting and editing techniques.

== Release ==
Solvent premiered at the Slash Filmfestival in Vienna on 26 September 2024. The North American premiere was at the Nightmares Film Festival. The film was shown at the Diagonale in Graz in March 2025. Uncut also covered the film in its retrospective on the 2024 festival.

Film Movement released the film on VOD and digital platforms in the United States and Canada on 10 October 2025. It was added to Shudder on 4 May 2026.

== Reception ==
Solvent has an 87% rating on Rotten Tomatoes, based on 15 reviews.

Rue Morgue's Shawn Macomber said the film convincingly portrays a descent into madness. Der Standard included Solvent in its 2024 year-end film selection.

Solvent won "The Film From Hell", the best-of-the-festival award at the 2024 Nightmares Film Festival.
