= Roboexotica =

Annual festival in Austria

- Status: active
- Genre: festival, exhibition
- Frequency: annually
- Location: Vienna
- Country: Austria
- Inaugurated: founded 1999
- Attendance: 1,500–3,000
- Organizer: monochrom, Shifz
- Website: roboexotica.com

Roboexotica (sometimes spelled: Roböxotica) is an annual festival and conference where scientists, researchers, computer experts and artists from all over the world build "cocktail robots" capable of mixing, serving or consuming cocktails. The conference covers the subjects of technological innovation, futurology and science fiction. Roboexotica is also an ironic attempt to criticize techno-triumphalism and to dissect technological hypes.
