= Johannes Grenzfurthner =

Austrian artist, writer, curator, and theatre and film director

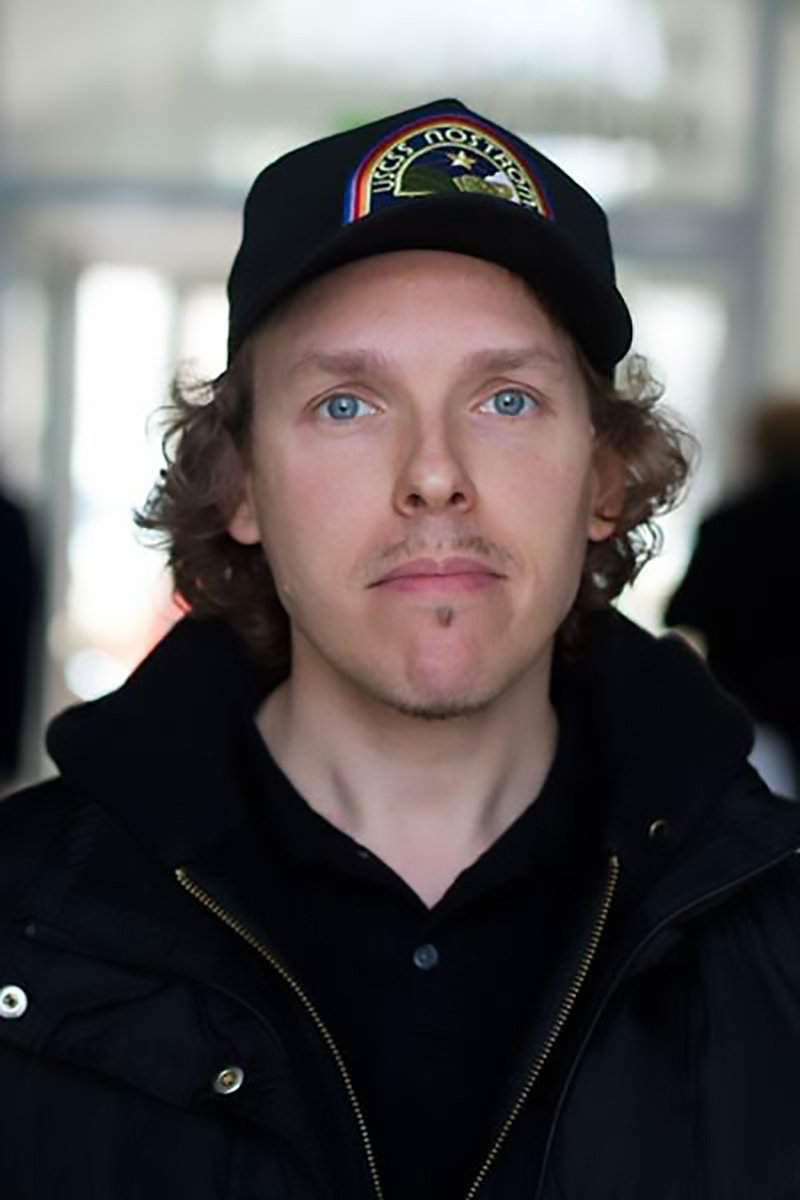
- Grenzfurthner at Museumsquartier, Vienna (2011)
- Born: 13 June 1975 (age 51); Vienna, Austria
- Occupations: Artist, filmmaker, writer, actor, curator, theatre director, performer, lecturer
- Website: grenzfurthner.com

Signature
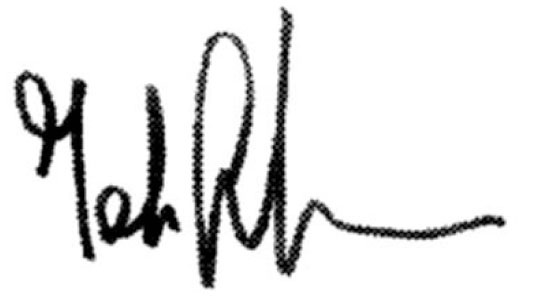

Johannes Grenzfurthner (Austrian German: [joˈhanɛs ˈɡrɛntsfʊrtnɐ]; born 1975 in Vienna) is an Austrian artist who is the founder, conceiver and artistic director of monochrom, an art and theory group and film production company.

== Career ==
In the early 1990s, Grenzfurthner was a member of several BBS message boards. Grenzfurther used his online connections to create monochrom, a zine or alternative magazine that dealt with art, technology and subversive cultures. His motivation was to react to the emerging conservativism in cyber-cultures of the early 1990s, and to combine his political background in the Austrian punk and antifascist movement with discussion of new technologies and the cultures they create. The publication featured interviews and essays by for example, Bruce Sterling, HR Giger, Eric Drexler, Terry Pratchett and Bob Black, using an experimental layout style developed by Grenzfurthner. In 1995 the group decided to cover new artistic practices and started experimenting with different media: computer games, robots, puppet theater, musical, short films, pranks.

The group is known for working with different media, art and entertainment formats. Grenzfurthner calls this "looking for the best weapon of mass distribution of an idea".

Grenzfurthner was head of the Arse Elektronika festival in San Francisco.and hosted Roboexotica, the international Festival for Cocktail-Robotics. He was head of Hedonistika, a festival for artistic food tech and robotic indulgement.

Grenzfurthner wrote and directed theatre plays and interventionist art.

=== Film ===
Grenzfurther is the CEO of film production company monochrom Propulsion Systems. He is member of the Austrian Director's Guild and the Association of Austrian Documentary Filmmakers.

He wrote and directed shorts and feature films. His first TV film was the independent fantasy-comedy Die Gstettensaga: The Rise of Echsenfried. (2014). Parts of his comedy show "Schicksalsjahre eines Nerds" form the basis of his documentary film Traceroute (2016). That was followed by Glossary of Broken Dreams (2018). His horror feature Masking Threshold premiered at Fantastic Fest in September 2021 and was released by Drafthouse Films.

His horror film Razzennest had its premiere at Fantastic Fest 2022. His documentary feature Hacking at Leaves had its premiere at Diagonale in 2024. His horror mystery feature Solvent had its premiere in September 2024.

=== Academia, writing, lecturing ===
Grenzfurthner lectures at art institutions, symposions and political events, teaches at universities and mentors students.

He has published books, essays and articles on politics, contemporary art, communication processes and philosophy including Mind and Matter: Comparative Approaches Towards Complexity, Do androids sleep with electric sheep?, Of Intercourse and Intracourse: Sexuality, Biomodification and the Techno-Social Sphere and Pr0nnovation?: Pornography and Technological Innovation.

2020 through 2021, he was editor-in-chief of the print and online magazine The Free Lunch.

Since April 2023, he has been contributing as a weekly columnist to the Austrian news magazine Profil.

== Personal life ==
Grenzfurthner lives and works in Vienna. As a child, he spent a lot of time at his grandparents' farm in the small village of Unterzögersdorf (a cadastral municipality of Stockerau). His grandparents' experienced Nazism in World War II and the Soviet occupation in allied-occupied Austria which influenced his long-term project Soviet Unterzoegersdorf.

== Selected filmography ==
- Hacking at Leaves (2024) – director, writer, producer, actor
- Razzennest (2022) – director, writer, producer
- Masking Threshold (2021) – director, writer, producer, actor
- Glossary of Broken Dreams (2018) – director, writer, producer, actor
- Clickbait (2018) – actor
- Traceroute (2016) – director, writer, producer, host
- Die Gstettensaga: The Rise of Echsenfriedl (2014) – director, writer, producer

== Selected theater ==
- Udo 77 (Rabenhof Theater, Vienna, 2004/2005) – director, actor, writer

== Music ==
- Carefully Selected Moments (album, Trost Records, 2008)
