= Georg Paul Thomann =

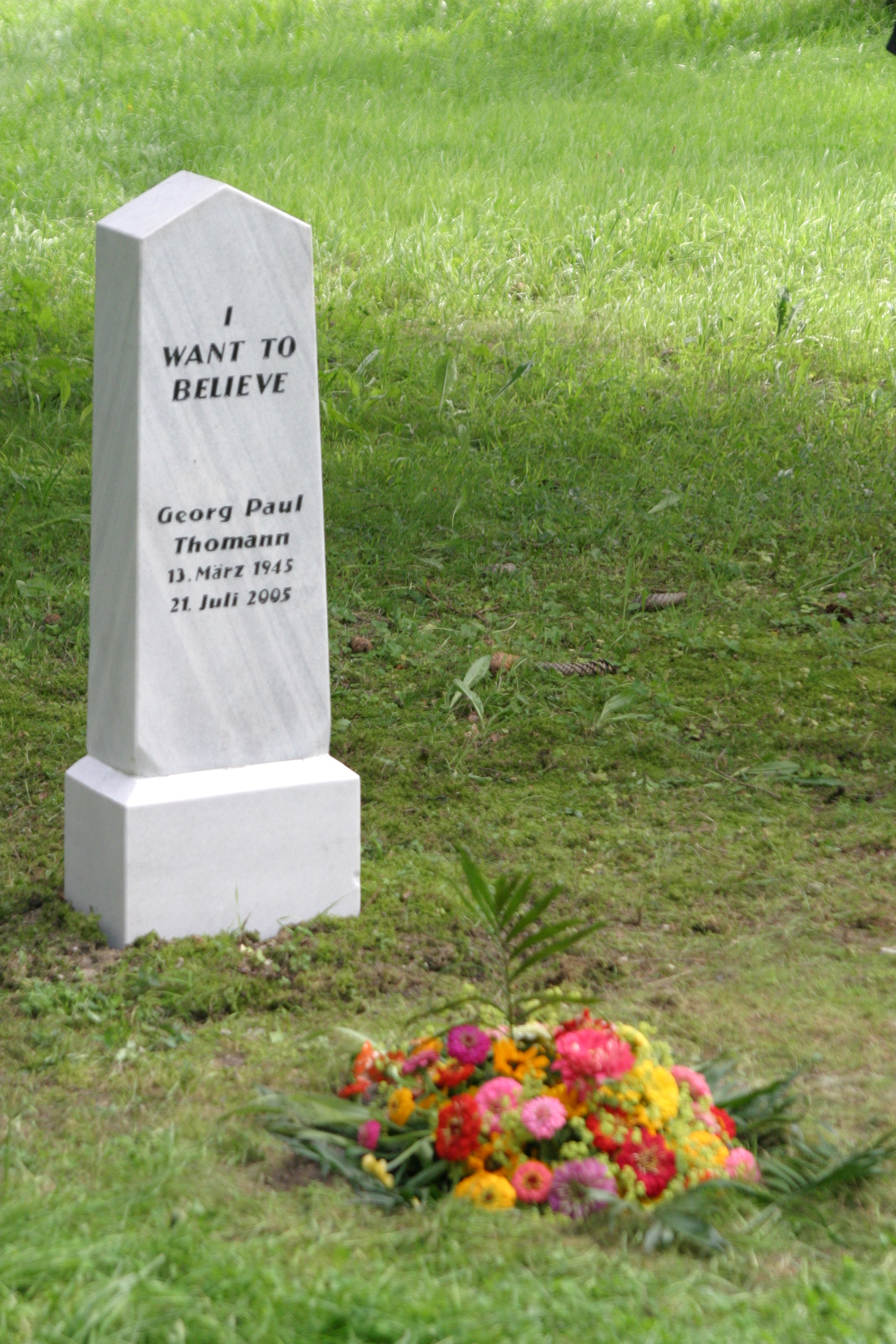
- Georg Paul Thomann's grave in Hall in Tirol, Austria (created by monochrom in 2005)
- Born: Georg Paul Thomann; March 13, 1945; Vorarlberg, Austria
- Died: July 21, 2005 (aged 60); Hall in Tirol, Austria
- Education: Academy of Fine Arts, Vienna
- Known for: Painting, Sculpture, Film, Music, Conceptual Art
- Movement: Viennese Actionism, Punk

Georg Paul Thomann (March 13, 1945 – July 21, 2005) was purported to be a renowned Austrian conceptual artist of the late 20th century. In reality, he was the fictitious creation of the Austrian art group monochrom who started working on his biography in the summer of 2000.

== São Paulo Art Biennial ==
The art group monochrom was chosen to represent the Republic of Austria at the São Paulo Art Biennial, São Paulo (Brazil) in 2002. However, the political climate in Austria, where-in the center-right People's Party had recently formed a coalition with Jörg Haider's radical-right Austrian Freedom Party, gave the left-wing art group concerns about acting as representatives of their nation. Monochrom dealt with the conundrum by sending the persona of Georg P. Thomann, an irascible, controversial (and completely fictitious) artist of longstanding fame and renown. Eva Grinstein remarks in Flash Art that through the implementation of this ironic mechanism – even the catalogue included the biography of the non-existent artist – the group solved with pure fiction the philosophical and bureaucratic dilemma attached to the system of representation presented to them by the Biennial.

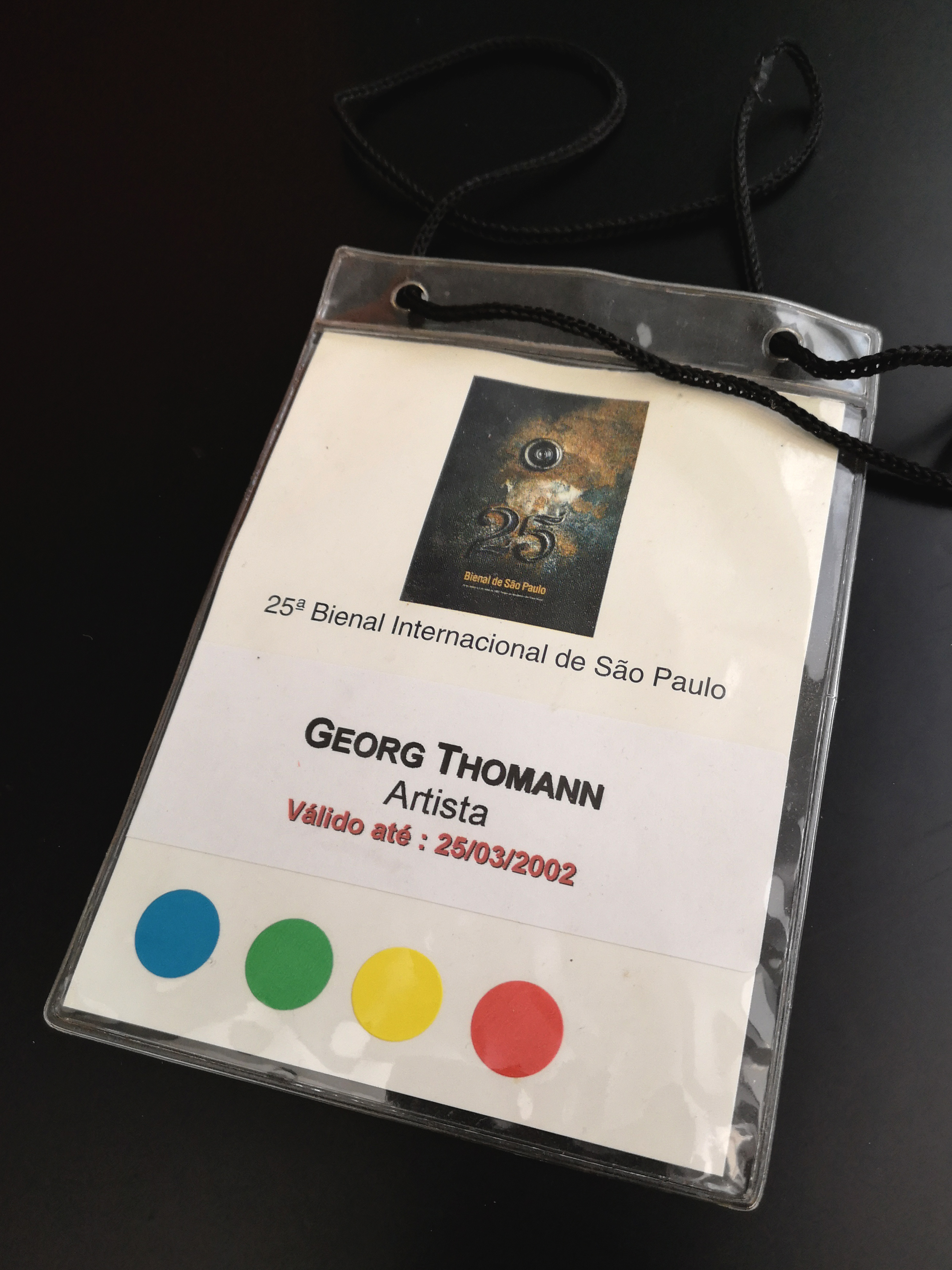
Georg Paul Thomann's badge at the 25th Sao Paulo Biennial art exhibition

A further development related to Georg Paul Thomann took place once the São Paulo Art Biennial was underway. The artist Chien-Chi Chang was invited as the representative of Taiwan, but the country's name was removed by the administration from his cube overnight and replaced by the label, "Museum of Fine Arts, Taipei". As the members of monochrom discovered, China had threatened to retreat from the Biennial (and create massive diplomatic problems) if the organizers of the Biennial were thought to be challenging the "One-China policy". Nico Israel wrote in Artforum that the chief curator of the Biennial, Alfons Hug, was seeking appeasement of China to avoid blowing up political minefields. Chang's open letter remained unanswered. Under the guise of Thomann, monochrom invited artists from several countries to show their solidarity with Chang by taking the adhesive letters from their countries' name tags and giving them to Chang so that he could remount "Taiwan" outside his room. Monochrom wanted to show that artists do not necessarily have to internalize the fragmentation and isolation imposed by the rat-race of art markets and exhibitions as society-controlling imperatives. Several Asian newspapers reported about the performance. One Taiwanese newspaper headlined: "Austrian artist Georg Paul Thomann saves 'Taiwan'".

Thomas Edlinger writes in his book "Der wunde Punkt" (2015) that monochrom's Taiwan intervention is an excellent example for new forms of institutional critique: "[It] shows an area of conflict between inclusion and exclusion, and one has to recognize that institutional critique is constantly changing and cannot know any fixed rules. Contextualization and site specificity have become key terms. Depending on the situation, it proceeds very differently and also wants very different things. Moreover, the change from criticism to affirmation is always possible and hardly predictable."

== Thomann's death ==
In 2005 monochrom published a press release that "Austrian artist and writer Prof. Georg Paul Thomann died in a tragic accident at the tender age of 60." Many Austrian newspapers, still not aware of the fake, printed Thomann's obituary.

On July 29, 2005 the group staged his funeral in Hall in Tirol. They created Georg Paul Thomann's tombstone and added an engraved URL of the Thomann project page. Thomann's tombstone was originally placed in the town's park, but it got removed in the same year by order of the head of a nearby psychiatric clinic. Patients of clinic had started to put down wreaths and flowers on Thomann's grave and frequently large numbers of patients were praying for Thomann. As a first reaction, the director of the hospital had the headstone covered with drapery, but later on ordered its complete removal. This happened without the consent of monochrom or the city government of Hall in Tirol, which had given its full approval of the public sculpture. It was unclear what had happened to the tombstone. First, it was discovered on a roundabout near a DIY store in town, but it got removed from there as well. After several years of trying to track it down, the tombstone was discovered in the fruit cellar of a local farmer. It was brought to Vienna where it was shown as part of monochrom's 20th anniversary exhibition at MUSA.
The tombstone is currently part of the art collection of the city of Vienna.

== Reception and legacy ==
The project is often cited as an important art project of the 2000s and one of the most prominent art pranks of the decade.

Georg Paul Thomann is featured in RE/Search's "Pranks 2" book (2006).

Various authors and artists use Thomann as a collective pseudonym in their work or placed works in publications and galleries. Peter Kramer reviewed Thomann's fictitious short film "Gutes Erb(g)ut/Schlechtes Erbgut" in the film magazine Ray (2/2002). German author Johannes Ullmaier cites Thomann's fictional book "Die Konflikt-Masche" (1999) in his book Von Acid nach Adlon. Stefanie Udema also refers to the book in her essay "Christian Kracht and the Development of Pop Literature". Artist Ryan Gander used a 16 mm film allegedly created by Georg Paul Thomann in his installation The Best Club (2011). Colombian screenwriter, producer, and director Luis Ospina also sometimes used the pseudonym Georg Paul Thomann.

Artist Hadas Emma Kedar created a short documentary film called "The Thomann In(ter)vention". It was released in March 2018.
