= Monochrom =

Austrian art collective and publisher

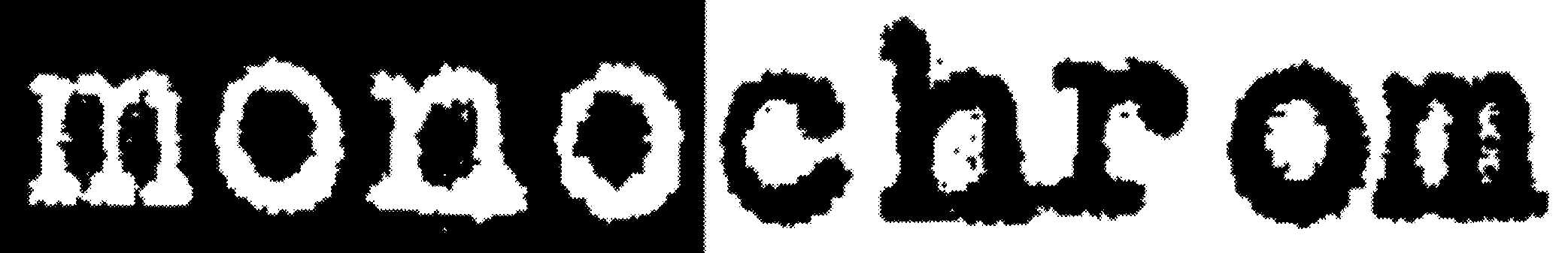
- Formation: 1993; 33 years ago
- Founder: Johannes Grenzfurthner and Franz Ablinger
- Type: Artist collective
- Headquarters: MuseumsQuartier, Vienna, Austria
- Members: Johannes Grenzfurthner; Franz Ablinger; Harald List; Evelyn Fürlinger; Frank Apunkt Schneider; Günther Friesinger; Daniel Fabry; Anika Kronberger; Roland Gratzer
- Website: www.monochrom.at

Monochrom (stylised as monochrom) is an Austrian art collective and publisher based in Vienna. Founded in 1993 by Johannes Grenzfurthner and Franz Ablinger, it began as a fanzine concerned with cyberculture, science, art and politics. The group later expanded into performance, media art, computer games, theatre, festivals and film. Since 2018, monochrom OG has been registered in Austria as a film-production company.

The collective uses the term "context hacking" for an approach that applies ideas associated with hacking to social and cultural systems. Its work commonly combines political criticism, satire, fiction and technology, with the medium chosen according to the subject of a project.

== History ==
In the early 1990s, Grenzfurthner used FidoNet and other bulletin board systems to follow cyberpunk and international underground culture. He later said that he wanted to create a German-language fanzine that brought together technology, art and left-wing politics, partly in response to the liberal politics he associated with American cyberculture magazines such as Mondo 2000. He circulated a request for contributors through FidoNet, to which Ablinger responded.

The first issue of Monochrom appeared in 1993. The magazine was published irregularly and combined writing on art, technology, science, philosophy and popular culture with an experimental collage-based design. Grenzfurthner and Ablinger initially produced the publication as a small print fanzine and distributed material through FidoNet.

Around 1995, the group began working outside the magazine format. Its early experiments included short films, robots, computer games, puppet theatre and public actions. In 1998, its internet-controlled robot Der Exot was included in the Junge Szene exhibition at the Vienna Secession. The group subsequently added conferences, musicals, theatre productions and longer-form film work to its activities.

In 2013, the MUSA museum in Vienna presented the twentieth-anniversary retrospective Die waren früher auch mal besser: monochrom (1993–2013). The exhibition documented the group’s work in publishing, net culture, visual art, performance, theatre, games and film.

== Artistic approach ==
Monochrom describes its working method as "context hacking". The term treats cultural practices, institutions and social relationships as systems whose conventions can be examined and altered. The group has used this approach in fictional biographies, public interventions, participatory performances, conferences and media projects.

A related principle is the selection of a medium according to the story or argument being developed. In a 2013 interview, Grenzfurthner and Günther Friesinger listed musicals, computer games, performances, online videos and films as possible forms rather than treating any one medium as central to the group’s work. Accounts of monochrom’s work have accordingly described it as moving between political criticism, cyberculture, comedy and storytelling.

== Projects ==
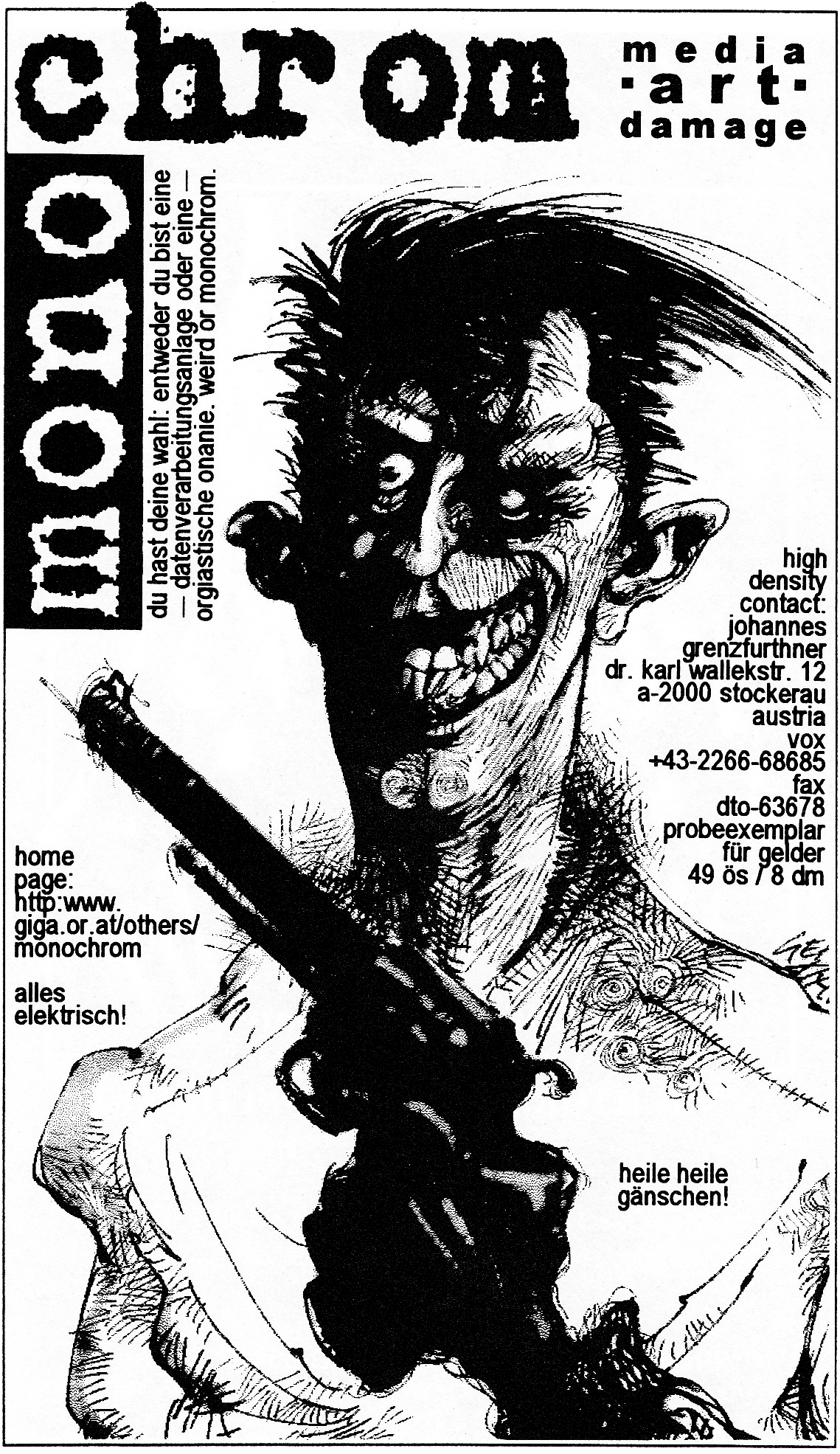
Flyer for Monochrom's publication and community activity, 1996. Drawing by Gerhard Junker, flyer design by Michael Marrak.

Monochrom has operated as a transdisciplinary platform rather than working in a single medium. Over the course of its existence, the group has created hundreds of projects combining satire, political critique, fiction, research and participatory formats. These have included publications, performances, robots, computer games, festivals, theatre and film.

An early networked work was Der Exot (1997), a mobile robot fitted with a camera and controlled through a web interface. Since several users could attempt to direct it at the same time, they had to coordinate their commands through an accompanying chat room.

Other participatory works have involved staged transactions and physical experiences. In Wir kaufen Seelen (1998), passers-by near St. Stephen’s Cathedral were offered 50 Austrian schillings to sign over their souls. For Eignblunzn, members of the group ate blood sausage made using their own blood. Since 2005, Buried Alive has allowed volunteers to spend approximately fifteen minutes in a coffin buried underground; by 2018, more than 500 people had taken part in Europe and North America.

Monochrom has also worked with fictional identities and invented political settings. For the 2002 São Paulo Art Biennial, it created Georg Paul Thomann, a fictitious Austrian artist with an invented biography and body of work, and presented him as Austria’s representative at the biennial. Soviet Unterzoegersdorf depicts a fictional Soviet enclave in the Austrian Weinviertel and has been developed through performances, theatre, film and computer games.

The group has used art fairs and commercial systems as settings for interventions. At Art Basel Miami Beach in 2005, Arad-II began with Günther Friesinger posing as a curator and distributing business cards. Grenzfurthner returned the following day in protective clothing and announced that the cards had been contaminated by a dangerous virus. In 2006, monochrom entered the sun-breasts-hammer emblem of the Lord Jim Lodge in the Coca-Cola Light Art Edition competition. The design was selected and appeared on 50,000 bottles.

Recurring projects include Roboexotica, a Vienna festival for robots that prepare, serve or consume cocktails, and Arse Elektronika, a conference and festival about sexuality and technology. Roboexotica was founded in 1999 and is organised with the group Shifz. Arse Elektronika was first held in San Francisco in 2007 and has included lectures, discussions, performances, films and technological artworks. An edition titled Sexponential was presented at the Ars Electronica Festival in 2023.

Taken together, the projects have led commentators to describe monochrom as an evolving laboratory for context hacking, experimental storytelling and critical cultural production.

=== monochrom film ===
Film and video have formed part of monochrom's work since the 1990s, with film production becoming a larger part of its activities during the 2010s. Monochrom OG was entered in the Austrian company register in 2018, with film production as its stated line of business.

The company produces feature films, documentaries and short films by members of the collective and other filmmakers. Its productions include films directed by Johannes Grenzfurthner, Matthias Ramon Jaklitsch, Ronald Pfisterer, Jasmin Hagendorfer, Marie-Christin Rissinger, Thyr Björnson and Sushant Chaudhary.

Many of monochrom's genre- and nerd-culture-related productions have appeared under the label "monochrom propulsion system", a reference to The Adventures of Buckaroo Banzai Across the 8th Dimension.

== Community ==
Since 2002, monochrom has maintained its principal office and studio at Q21 in Vienna’s MuseumsQuartier. Through the quartier21 Artist-in-Residence programme, the group invited visiting artists including Angela Dorrer, Jacob Appelbaum, David Fine, Bre Pettis, Audrey Penven, Kyle Machulis, Anouk Wipprecht, Jane Tingley and Phillip Stearns.

Monochrom has described itself as both an artist collective and a community, and as a social incubator for critical and subversive cultural work. Its community activities have included support for the Radius Festival and Play:Vienna, as well as cooperation with the Vienna hackerspace Metalab. For several years, monochrom ran the mobile workshop project Hackbus with FM4 presenter David "Daddy D" Dempsey. From 2007, the group also contributed to Boing Boing Video as its European correspondent.

During his 2007 residency with monochrom, Pettis researched the open-source RepRap 3D-printer project at Metalab. His initial plan was to build a robot capable of printing shot glasses for Roboexotica. Pettis later co-founded MakerBot Industries, and shot glasses continued to feature in demonstrations of the company’s printers.

== Filmography ==
- To Live and Survive (2025) – directed by Matthias Jaklitsch
- Solvent (2024) – directed by Johannes Grenzfurthner
- Hacking at Leaves (2024) – directed by Johannes Grenzfurthner
- Razzennest (2022) – directed by Johannes Grenzfurthner
- Transform! (2022) – directed by Marie-Christin Rissinger
- Masking Threshold (2021) – directed by Johannes Grenzfurthner
- Avenues (2021) – directed by Sushant Chaudhary
- Glossary of Broken Dreams (2018) – directed by Johannes Grenzfurthner
- Traceroute (2016) – directed by Johannes Grenzfurthner
- Die Gstettensaga: The Rise of Echsenfriedl (2014) – directed by Johannes Grenzfurthner
- Kiki and Bubu: Rated R Us (2011) – directed by Johannes Grenzfurthner

== Exhibitions and festivals ==
- Arad-II, Art Basel Miami Beach / US (2005)
- Die waren früher auch mal besser: monochrom (1993-2013) / Austria (2013)
- Junge Szene 98. Vereinigung Bildender Künstler, Wiener Secession, Vienna / Austria (1998)
- Roboexotica (Festival for Cocktail Robotics, Vienna, 1999–)
- Robotronika. Public Netbase t0 Media~Space!, Institut für neue Kulturtechnologien, Vienna / Austria (1998)
- Seriell Produziertes. Diagonale (Austrian Film Festival), Graz / Austria (2000)
- techno(sexual) bodies / videotage / Hong Kong / China (2010)
- The Influencers, Center for Contemporary Culture / Barcelona / Spain (2008)
- Unterspiel, Contemporary Art Gallery, Vancouver / Canada (2005)
- world-information.org. Museum of Contemporary Art, Brussels / Belgium (2000) and Belgrad / Serbia (2003)
