= Microfilmmaking =

Microfilmmaking is the production of ultra-low budget movies. These films generally are made by impassioned filmmakers operating outside the Hollywood mainstream. While a "low budget" Hollywood film can cost millions of dollars, 80% to 90% of all independent films are made on budgets of $30,000 or less.

Without the backing of a major movie studio, microfilmmakers have to be resourceful in raising even their modest budgets. They often hold regular jobs and fund their film projects out of their own pockets. Many begin the filmmaking process by approaching friends and family for donations of money or services.

Microfilmmakers are often the first to adopt new technologies and techniques, economic necessity leading to creative invention. The lack of money leads them to try new ways of doing things, or invent new techniques. Microfilmmakers were among the first to shoot movies on video.

== History ==
Beginning with the home video revolution in the 1980s, Hollywood and mainstream media companies have undergone a radical transformation. The sheer number of platforms for entertainment product has grown and changed, and continues to evolve driven by the Internet, DVDs, high-definition video technology, video on demand, digital video recorders, mobile devices, and more. The rapid evolution has wreaked havoc with the traditional Hollywood model and has opened the door for new talent.

As recording technology advanced, cameras became less expensive, more accessible, and easier to operate, leading to more widespread adoption among American households. This development reflected a shift in filmmaking that Francis Ford Coppola commented on, stating, “The great hope is that...some little fat girl in Ohio is going to be the new Mozart and make a beautiful film.”

The popularity of YouTube and user-generated video further fueled “do-it-yourself” video production, and the micro-budget film was born. Producers and directors began making full-length feature films on budgets as low as several thousand dollars, usually borrowed from friends and family.

== Financing ==
Stacey Parks, author of The Insider's Guide to Independent Film Distribution, talks about using a wide variety of tools to help micro-filmmakers finance their projects. There are four main ways: private equity, crowd funding, tax incentives, and sponsorship.

== Market impact ==
The success of the micro-budget film Paranormal Activity in fall 2009 has given a stamp of legitimacy to micro-filmmaking. Given the contraction of advertising revenues in television, the severe decline in DVD sales of major motion pictures (which generally results in approximately 50% of a film's revenues), the reduced markets for Hollywood products internationally and the skyrocketing production costs of some mainstream films, translates into a reduction in movies made.
