= Razzennest =

2022 Austrian horror film

- Directed by: Johannes Grenzfurthner
- Written by: Johannes Grenzfurthner
- Produced by: Jasmin Hagendorfer, Guenther Friesinger, Julianne Gabert, Johannes Grenzfurthner
- Cinematography: Aman Pooni
- Music by: Alec Empire
- Production company: monochrom
- Release date: 29 September 2022 (Fantastic Fest)
- Running time: 81 minutes
- Country: Austria
- Language: English

Razzennest is a 2022 Austrian supernatural, satirical horror film written and directed by Johannes Grenzfurthner. The film was produced by art group monochrom.

Horror and sound play a notable role in the film. Grenzfurthner says that Razzennest forms a trilogy with Masking Threshold (2021) and Solvent (2024).

== Plot ==
South African filmmaker and enfant terrible Manus Oosthuizen meets with film critic Babette Cruickshank in a Los Angeles sound studio. With key members of Manus's crew joining, they record an audio commentary track for his new "elegiac feature documentary Razzennest" that cryptically deals with the legacy of the Thirty Years' War. Strange incidents occur during the recording session; one by one, the film crew members are possessed by the ghosts of soldiers and peasants from 1645, and history repeats itself.

== Cast ==
- Sophie Kathleen Kozeluh as Babette Cruickshank
- Michael Smulik as Manus Oosthuizen
- Anne Weiner as Ellen Zampaglione
- Roland Gratzer as Hetti Friesenbichler
- Jim Libby as Pat Kirkpatrick
- Bob Rose as Bob
- Joe Dante as Joe Dante, narrator

== Themes ==
Razzennest combines elements of satire, tragicomedy, drama, horror, and ghost story, but can also be considered a film about filmmaking and a self-reflexive film. Grenzfurthner cites Nikolaus Geyrhalter's 2016 documentary film Homo Sapiens as an aesthetic template for the kind of arthouse film that he wanted to satirize or "emulate."

Although Grenzfurthner calls Razzennest "bizarre", he remarks that he thinks that it is more accessible than his previous film Masking Threshold.

== Production ==
=== Filming ===
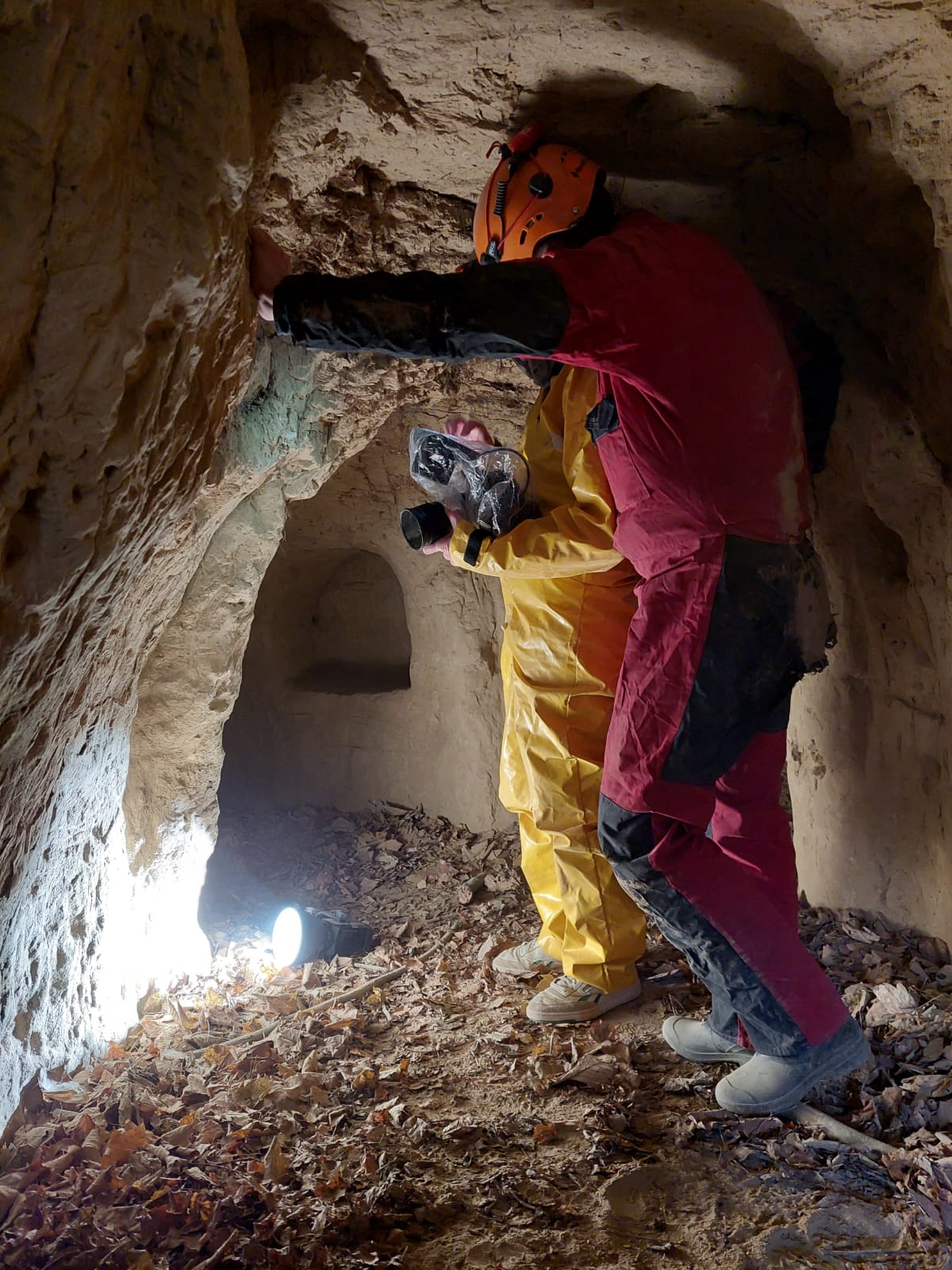
Razzennest film shoot inside one of the Schwedenhöhlen (Rohrwald)

Principal photography started on 2 March 2022, entirely in the Rohrwald region, with most of the shots in the villages Oberrohrbach (Leobendorf), Niederhollabrunn, Niederfellabrunn, and Leitzersdorf. Grenzfurthner states that the film "provided an exciting chance to portray a fascinating landscape, the Rohrwald, which is only a few kilometers from where I grew up."

As the plot focuses on the so-called Schwedenhöhlen (Swedish Caves), earthen stables that were carved into the loess in the 16th and 17th centuries, the film was shot at these very locations, bringing their historical significance to life.

=== Post-production ===
Grenzfurthner edited the film himself and mentioned in interviews that he wanted to be as precise as possible with the style and pace of the fictitious director/editor Oosthuizen.

=== Music ===
The soundtrack was created by German experimental electronic musician Alec Empire. Critic Richard Propes writes about the soundtrack: "Alec Empire's original score for the film is an immersive creepster that complements the visuals without dominating them. Empire never tells us what to think or feel, a refreshing approach consistent with Grenzfurthner's own artistry."

== Release ==
Razzennest had its world premiere on 29 September 2022 at Fantastic Fest as part of the Burnt Ends showcase. Festival curator Annick Mahnert calls it "an audio commentary feature film filled with surprises and inside jokes." The European premiere took place at the B3 Biennial of the Moving Image in Frankfurt. Festivals such as Nightmares Film Festival, A Night of Horror International Film Festival, South African Horrorfest, Cucalorus Film Festival, Feratum Film Festival (Mexico), and BizarroLand Film Festival have screened the film. The Austrian premiere was at Diagonale 2023 in Graz.

It was released on the US streaming service Fandor on 2 May 2023.

== Reception ==
Critical response has been positive. Daily Dead calls Razzennest "genuinely thought-provoking, scary, a bit satirical and bitingly funny." iHorror writes that the film is "an entirely new kind of horror film." Daily Grindhouse's Katelyn Nelson states that the film is "a novel approach to the forced confrontation with history we occasionally seem to need. Not in our faces enough to be decried as obvious or too on-the-nose, but impactful enough to make us think and remember. Is it worse to watch the horrors of war unfold before our eyes, or to hear them reinhabited in the present?" Melissa Hannon of Horror Geek Life states that "the sharp satirical dialogue rarely misses a beat." Timothy Glaraton of Horror Obsessive writes: "The highest form of praise I can give to Razzennest—and the highest form of praise I'll personally give to any film—is that it is truly unlike anything I've ever seen—not simply at Fantastic Fest, but anywhere." Louisa Moore of Screen Zealots says: "From the vivid and violent descriptions to the bloodcurdling screams, Razzennest is the stuff of nightmares." Screen Anarchy's Kyle Logan writes: "It not only effectively brings a horrific audio drama into cinema without losing any of the power of its images or its audio-only narrative, but also succeeds in exploring the themes of the far more self-consciously artful film-within-a-film. There are moments throughout that are not only scary, but also evoke a real sense of pathos for those who lived through the horrors of a 400-year-old war. That the film also manages to be hilarious at several points only adds to how special it is."

=== Awards ===
- Best Director for Johannes Grenzfurthner for Razzennest at Nightmares Film Festival 2022
- Best Screenplay for Johannes Grenzfurthner for Razzennest at South African Horrorfest 2022
- Best Editing for Johannes Grenzfurthner for Razzennest at South African Horrorfest 2022
- Special Jury Mention for Razzennest at Film Maudit 2.0 (Los Angeles) 2023
- Antonio Margheriti Award for Razzennest at the TOHorror Fantastic Film Fest (Turin, Italy) 2023

== See also ==
- Art horror
- Supernatural horror film
