= Rohrwald =

Forest in Lower Austria

Coordinates: 48°25′N 16°19′E

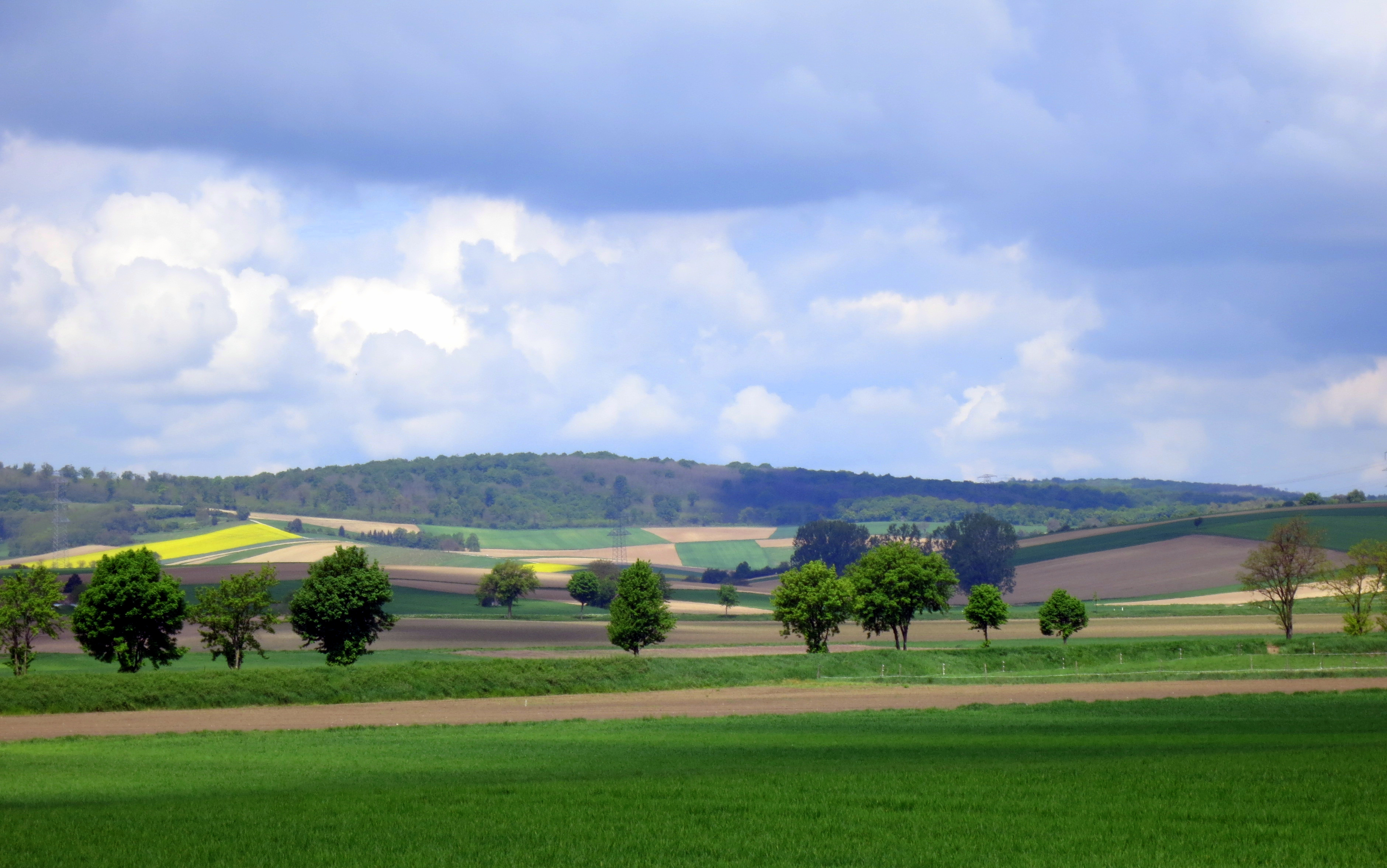

Geography
- Location: Korneuburg, Austria

The Rohrwald is a forest complex in the Weinviertel area of Lower Austria. With a total area of approx. 24 sq km (9 sq mi), it represents the third largest closed forest complex in the district of Korneuburg after the Tulln Basin-Danube floodplains and the Ernstbrunn Forest.

The Rohrwald extends over the municipalities Harmannsdorf, Leobendorf, Leitzersdorf and Niederhollabrunn, whereby the largest part lies in the cadastral municipality Rückersdorf.

The Rohrwald is located on a foothill of the flysch zone at the edge of the Korneuburg Basin and is therefore crossed by several streams, which is rather untypical for the Weinviertel. In the Weinviertel, which is poorly forested and intensively used for agricultural purposes, the Rohrwald has a high ecological value and an essential function as a local recreation area.

== Geology ==
Geologically, the western peaks of the Rohrwald - the Waschberg and the Michelberg (Haselbach) - which are no longer forested and thus provide a good panoramic view, belong to the Waschberg zone or Weinviertel cliff zone. It connects the Alps with the Carpathians via the Leiser Mountains, Falkenstein and the Moravian Karst north of Mikulov. The Weinviertel cliff zone and thus also parts of the Rohrwald belong to the Natura 2000 and FFH (Special Area of Conservation) protected areas Weinviertler Klippenzone. The area's bedrock is schistose-clay, clay-marl, and Greifenstein sandstone, all more or less overlain by loess. Old and new quarries show limestone in which remains of prehistoric animals can be found.

The highest mountains of the Rohrwald are: Michelberg (409 m), Waschberg (388 m), Steinberg (375 m), Karnabrunner Kirchberg (358 m), Höchberg (347 m), Höhlberg (323 m).

== Sights ==
Burg Kreuzenstein (Kreuzenstein castle) is a much-loved tourist destination and museum. It is located on a rising above Rohrwald, directly above Leobendorf, and between the towns of Korneuburg and Stockerau. The elevation is 266 m (AA), the height above the Danube about 100 metres (330 ft).

The so-called Schwedenhöhlen (Swedish Caves) are earthen stables cut into the loess in the 16th and 17th centuries. Among other things, they served as a shelter and hiding place for the inhabitants of the surrounding villages during the Thirty Years' War. During the Napoleonic Wars in 1809, the Swedish Caves, together with the "Alte Festung", a destroyed refuge castle, were places of refuge for the population. In the last weeks of the war in 1945, numerous women and children were still hiding in the earthen caves from the Soviet troops.

A common place of excursions is the "Goldenes Bründl" (Golden Spring), a spring near Oberrohrbach. There is a legend about the water source, according to which king Rudolf I of Germany on the way to the Battle on the Marchfeld against the Přemyslid king Ottokar II of Bohemia found a golden cup in the spring, which he, in turn, exchanged with a mermaid for a golden ring and luck for himself and his descendant. Today the spring is covered by a brick cottage with a tent roof. The water is used by the nearby inn of the same name.

== Art ==
Johannes Grenzfurthner's horror film Razzennest was shot entirely in the Rohrwald region. The Schwedenhöhlen are a central element of the plot.

== Images ==
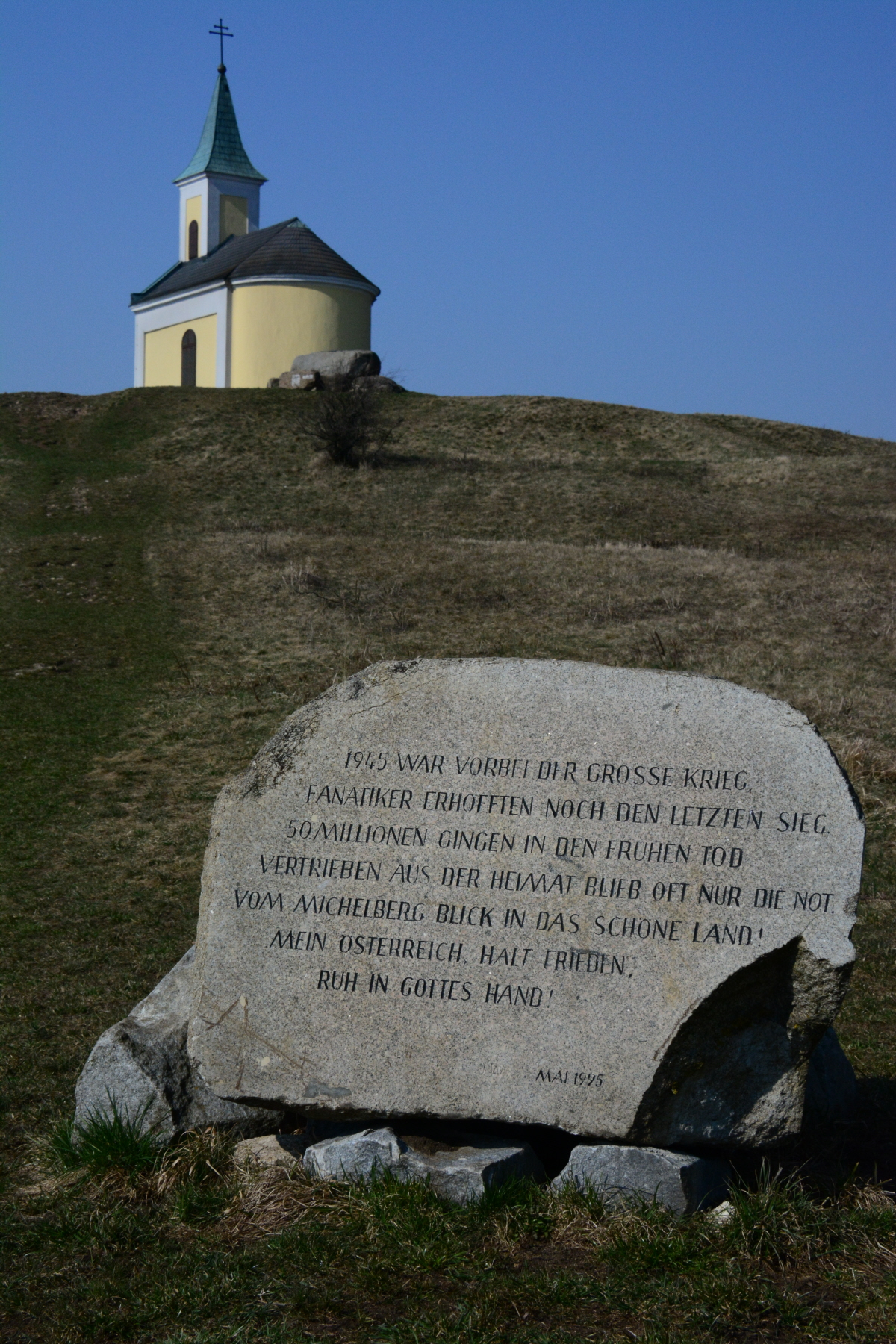
Chapel on the Michelsberg

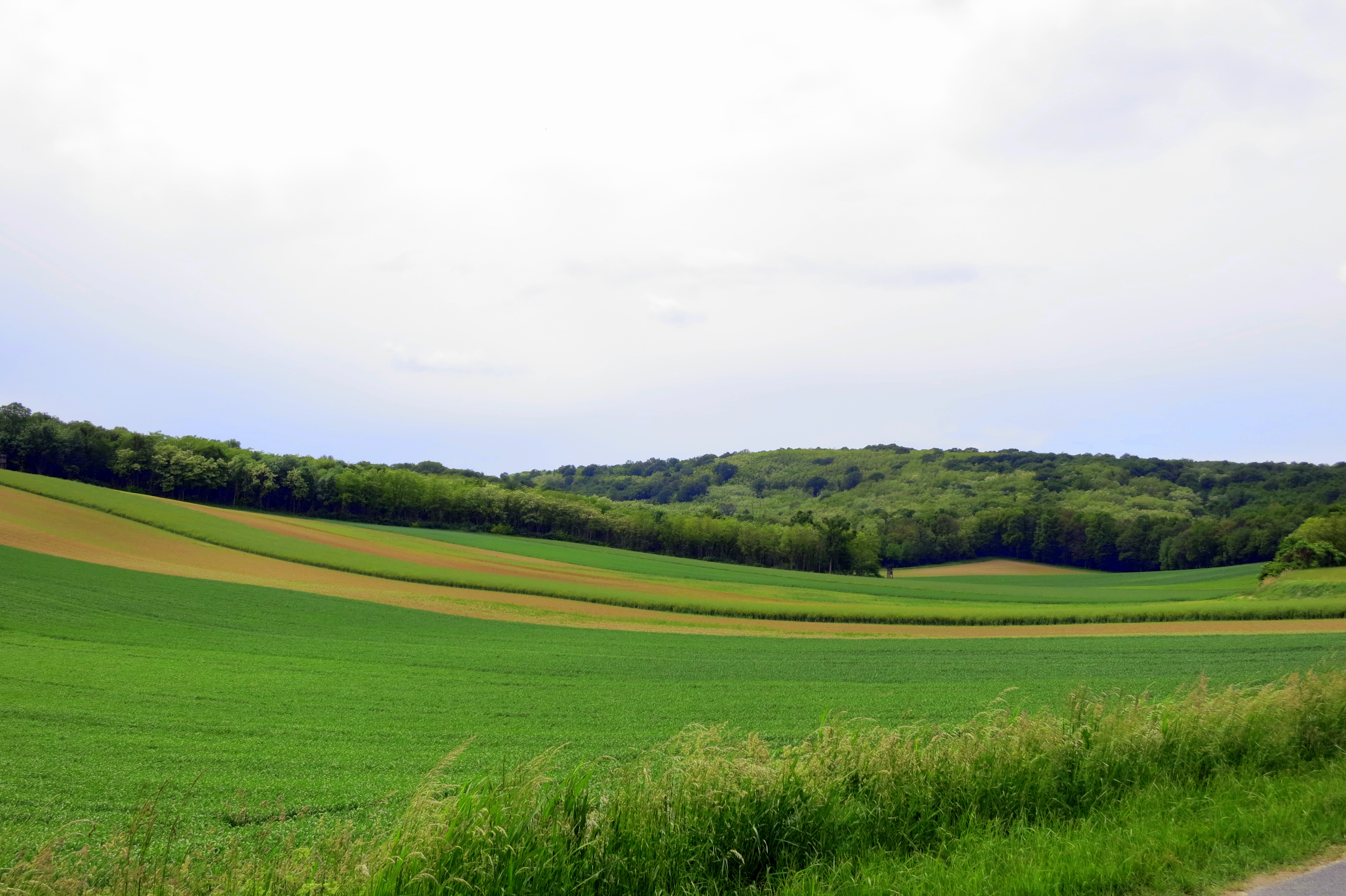
Rohrwald – Rückersdorf

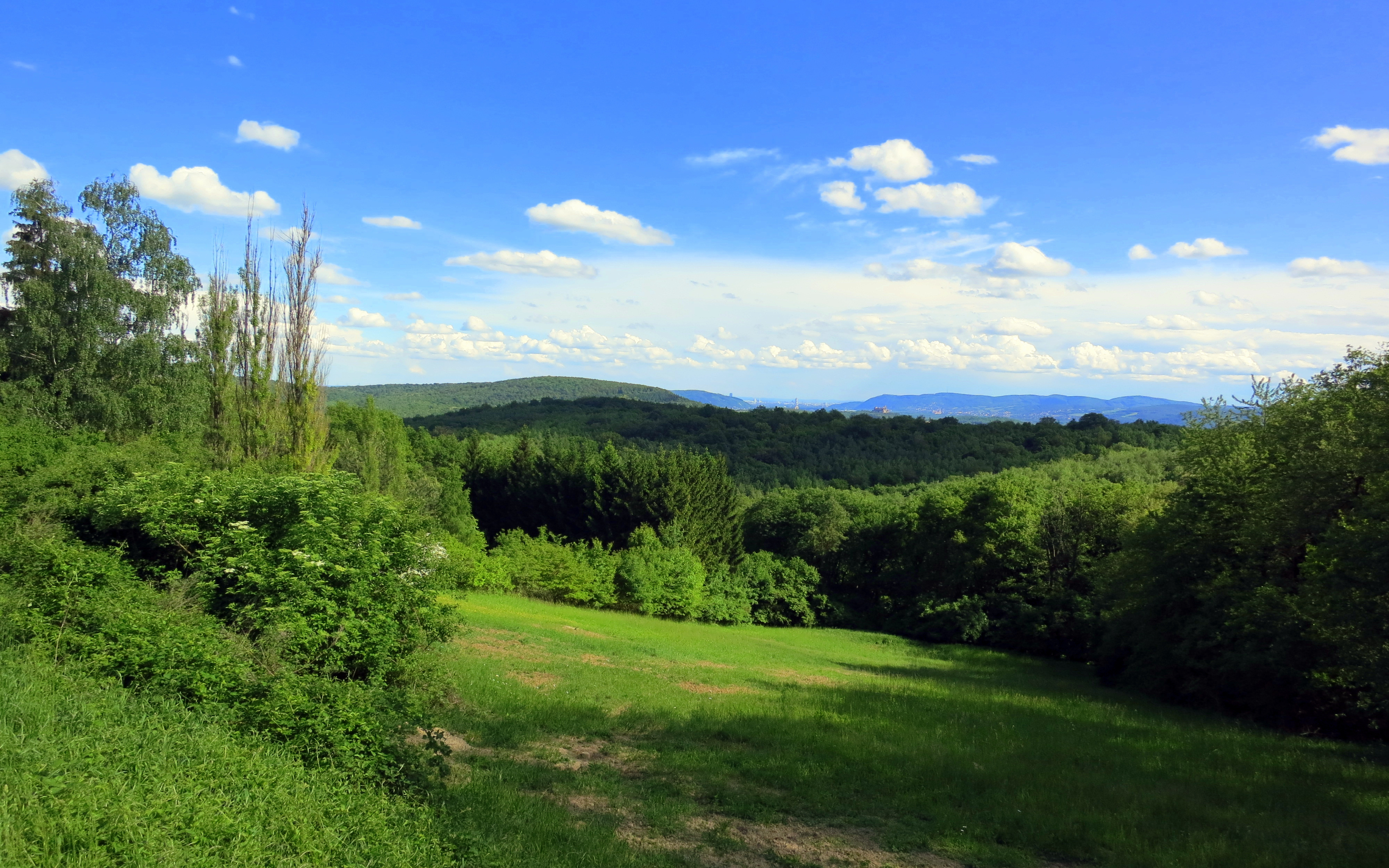
View towards Wiener Pforte

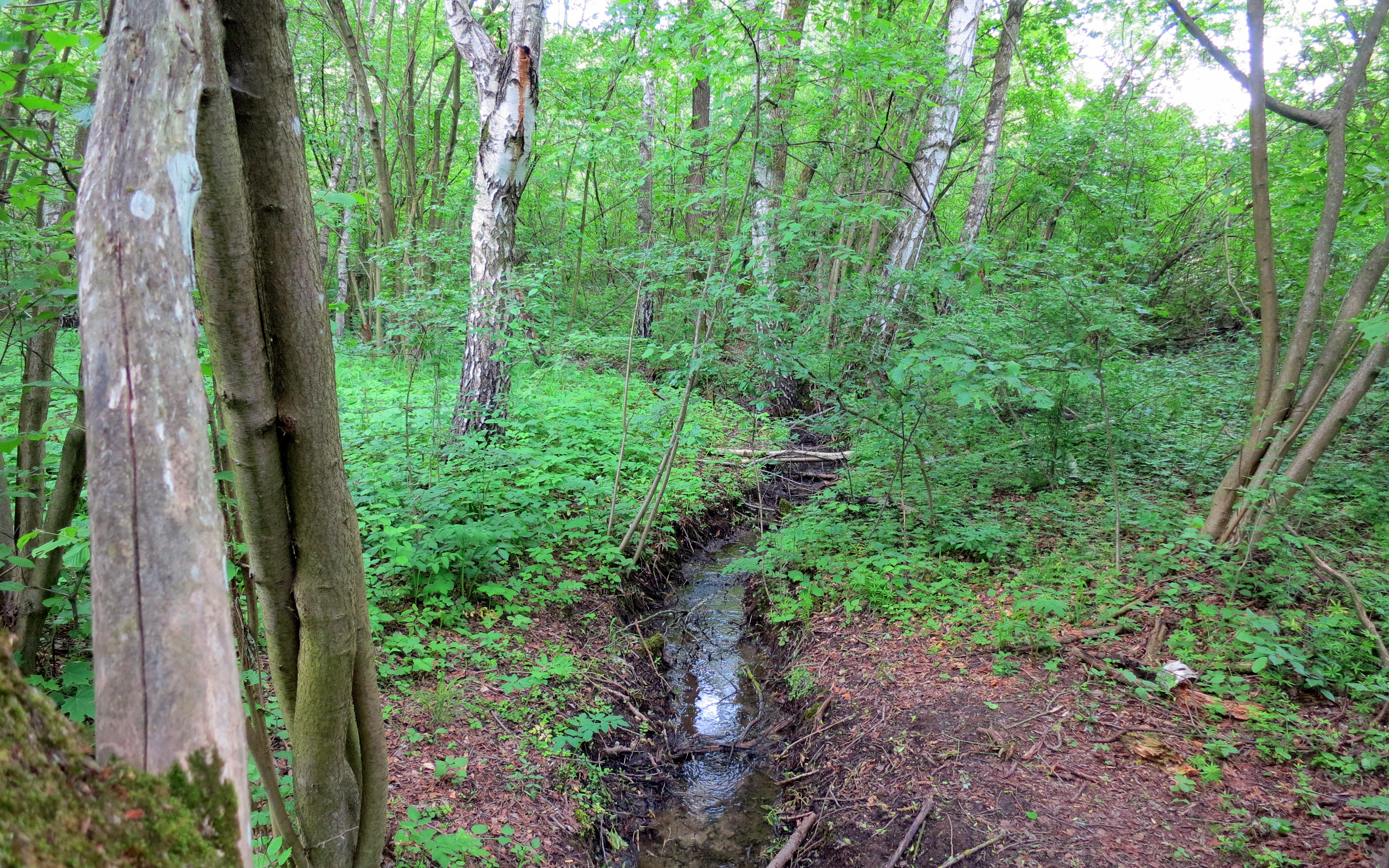
Wiesenbach, Rohrwald

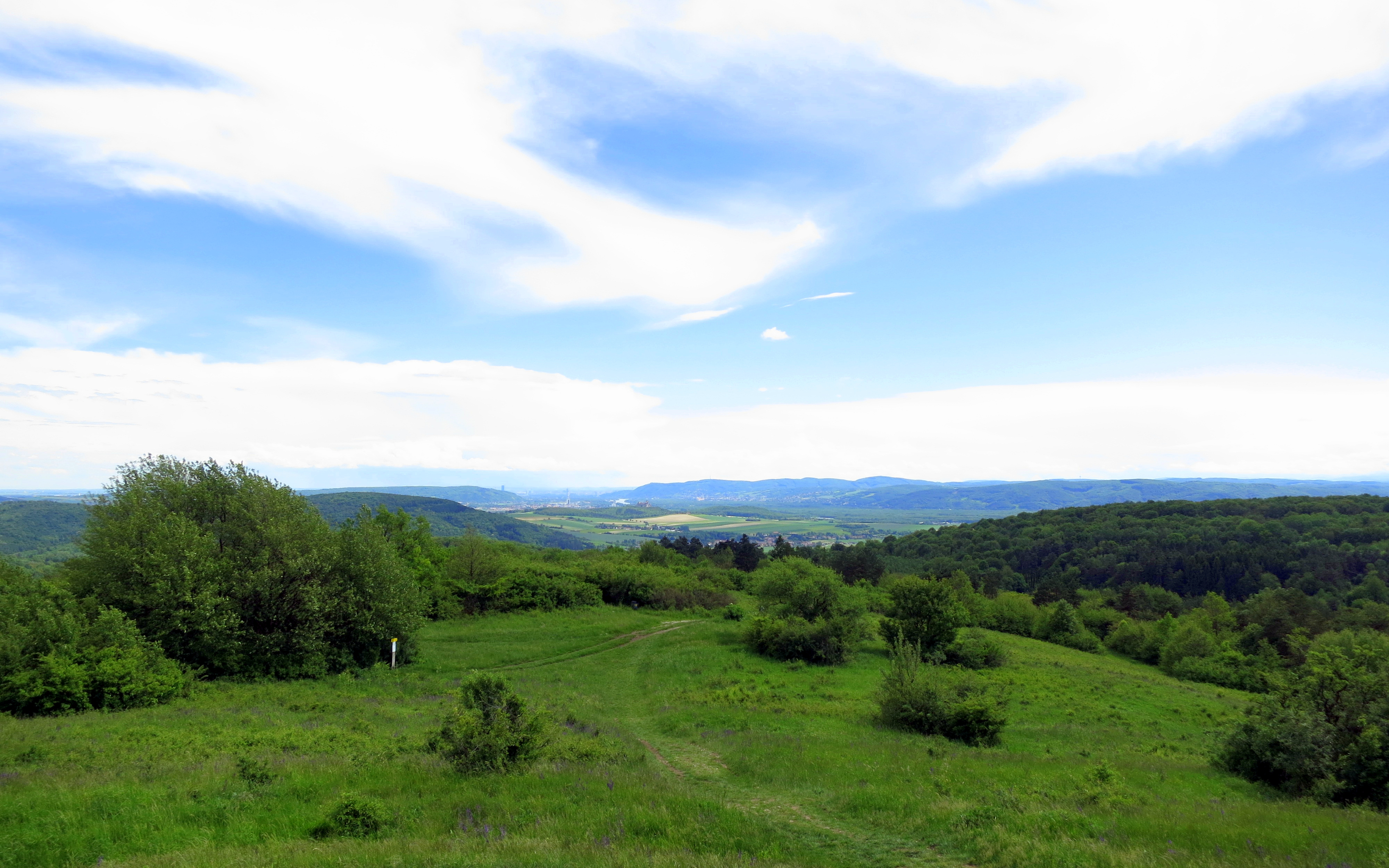
View Michelberg towards Burg Kreuzenstein

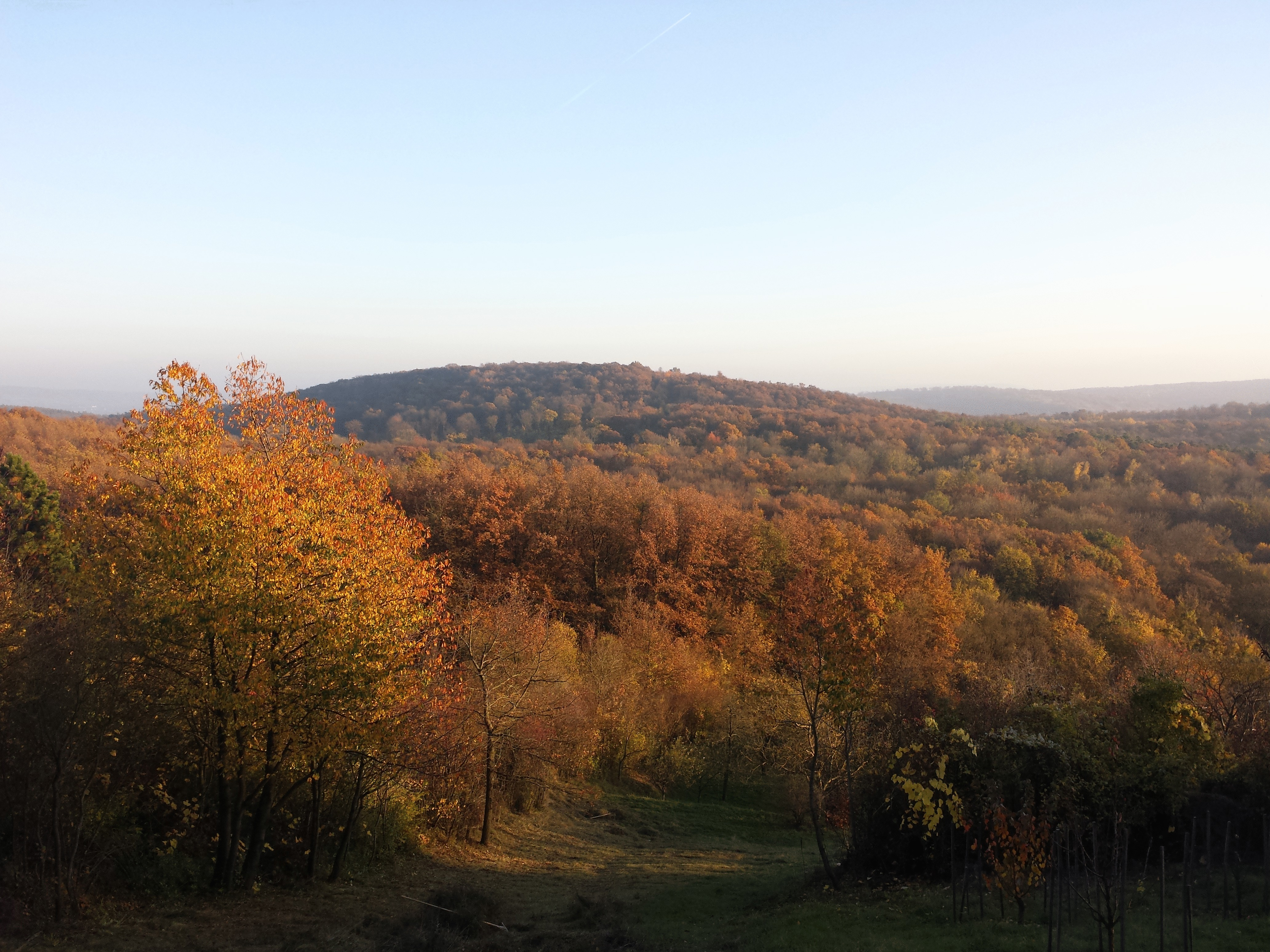
View from Alter Hollenstein

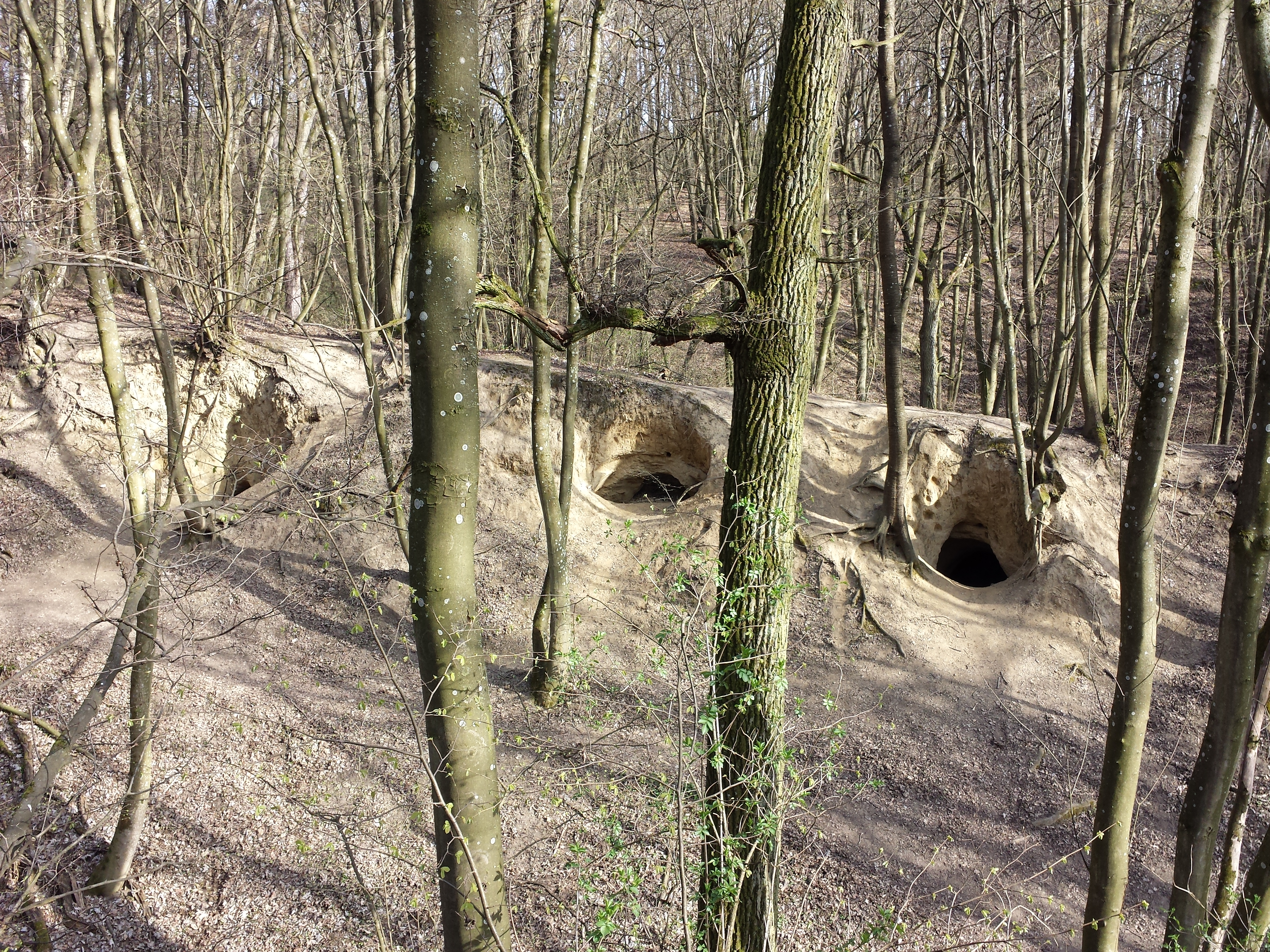
Schwedenhöhlen (Swedish Caves)

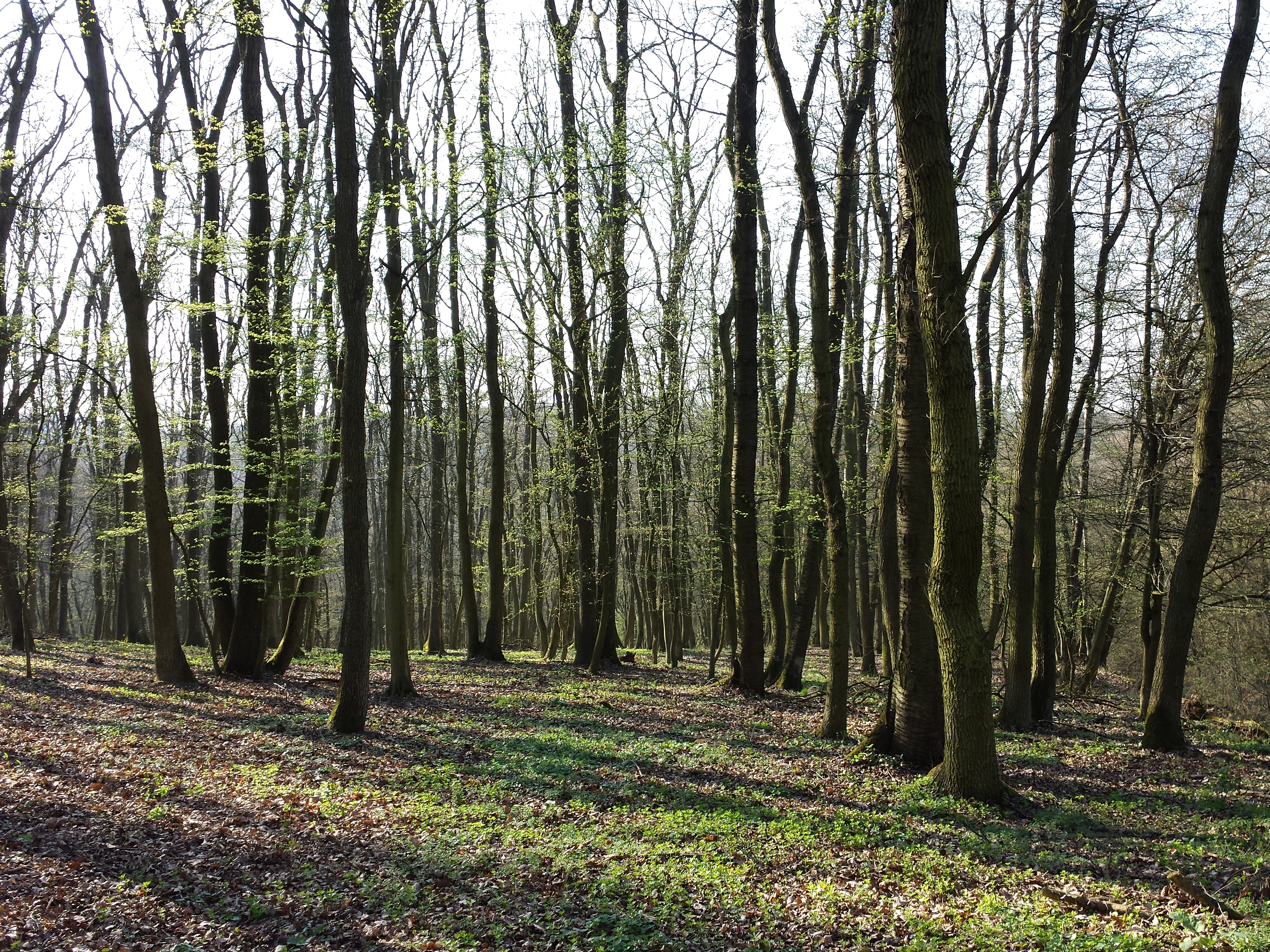
Oak-hornbeam forest in early spring

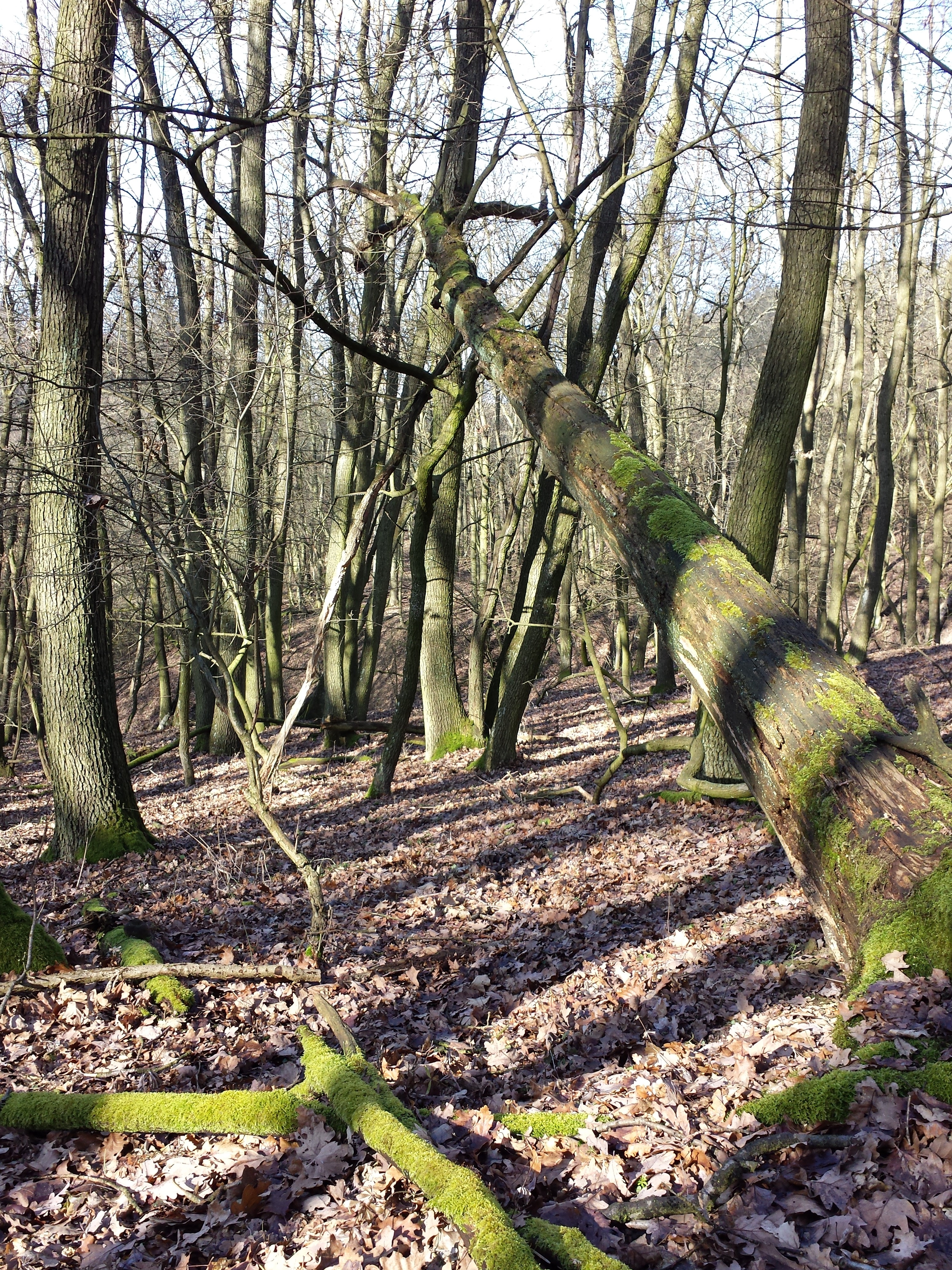
Forest with a high proportion of coarse woody debris

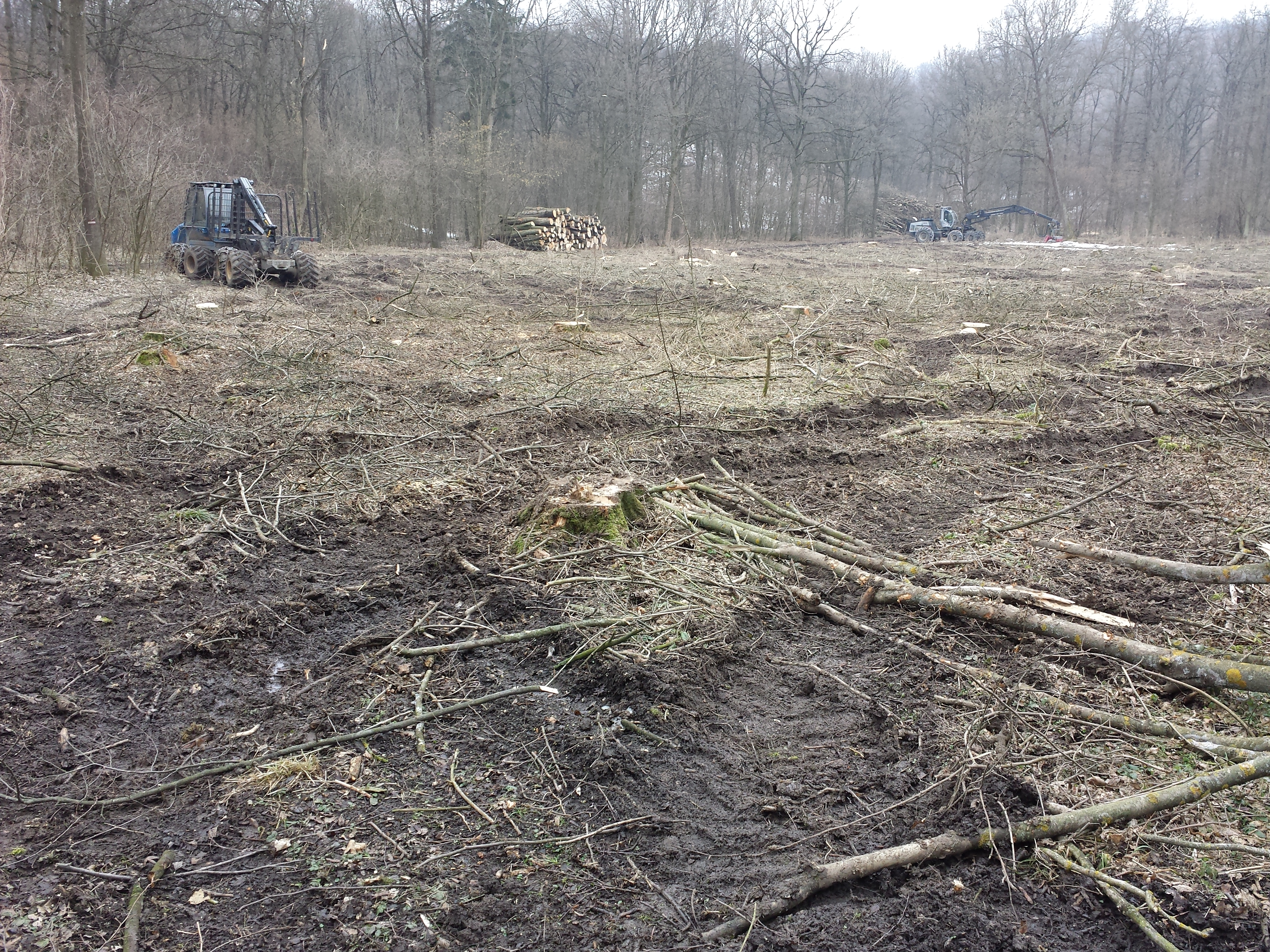
Deforestation with heavy machinery

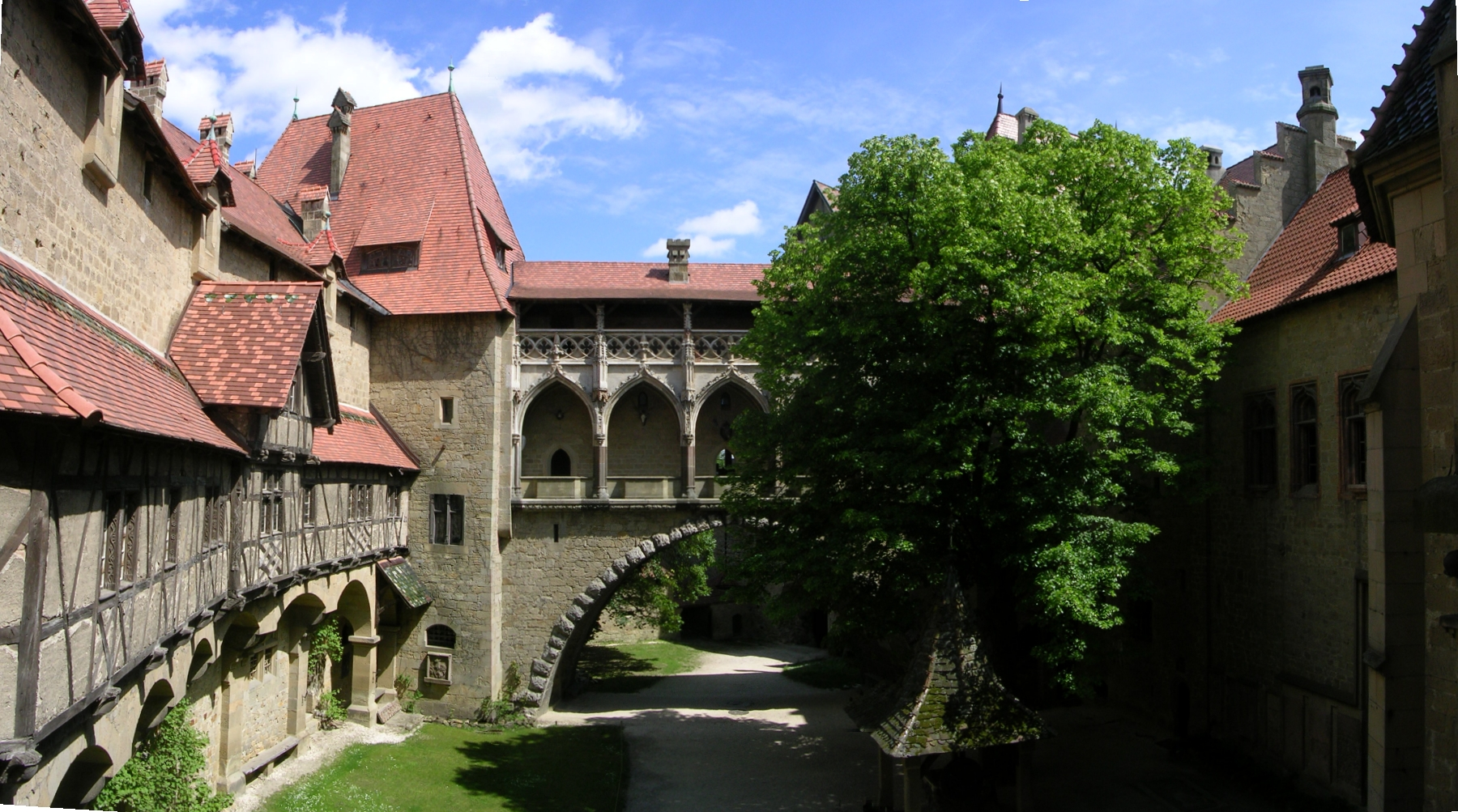
Castle Kreuzenstein
