= Masking Threshold (film) =

- Directed by: Johannes Grenzfurthner
- Written by: Johannes Grenzfurthner; Samantha Lienhard
- Produced by: Guenther Friesinger; Jasmin Hagendorfer; Julianne Gabert; Johannes Grenzfurthner
- Starring: Ethan Haslam
- Cinematography: Florian Hofer
- Music by: Tina "Tina 303" Gruensteidl; Mathias Augdoppler
- Production company: monochrom
- Distributed by: Drafthouse Films (United States)
- Release dates: September 2021 (Fantastic Fest); 30 September 2022 (United States)
- Running time: 94 minutes
- Country: Austria
- Language: English

Masking Threshold is a 2021 English-language Austrian horror film directed by Johannes Grenzfurthner, and produced by art group monochrom.

Sound plays an essential role in the film. Grenzfurthner says that Masking Threshold forms a trilogy with Razzennest and Solvent.

== Premise ==
An IT worker tries to cure his harrowing hearing impairment by conducting a series of experiments in his makeshift home lab.

== Cast ==
- Ethan Haslam as the protagonist (voice)
- Johannes Grenzfurthner as the protagonist (corporeal)
- Katharina Rose as Dana

All other cast members are but images on the protagonist's cellphone or on photographs and printouts.

== Production ==
The film was shot in the fall of 2019 on a microbudget of 25,000 euros in Grenzfurthner’s apartment in Vienna.

== Release ==
Masking Threshold premiered at Fantastic Fest 2021 in Austin, Texas.

Other festivals, including Molins Horror (2021), A Night of Horror (2021), Nightmares (2021), Feratum (2021), South African Horrorfest (2021), Cucalorus, Saskatoon, Slick 'n' Wrong, Shockfest, Sicilia Queer Film Fest Masking Threshold, Film Maudit 2.0, Central Florida, Unnamed Footage in San Francisco, Offscreen in Brussels, Diagonale 2022 in Graz, Panic Fest 2022, and Fantaspoa 2022 screened the film.

== Reception ==
=== Critical response ===
Critical response has been positive. The film holds a 100% approval rating on the review aggregator website Rotten Tomatoes, with a weighted average of 8.2/10. Jen Yamato of the Los Angeles Times writes: "Utilizing macro photography and ASMR-esque sound design, the immersive, experimental horror Masking Threshold pulls you down a rabbit hole where Reddit theorizing meets Lovecraftian fixation, paranoia bubbling over into a disturbing sensory experience." Erik Piepenburg of The New York Times says: "2022 was a stellar year for experimental horror. I'm adding Johannes Grenzfurthner's brazen and deeply disturbing film to the year's best formbusters."

=== Awards ===
- Best Feature Film at the British Horror Film Festival 2021

== See also ==
- Art horror
- Horror-of-personality
- Social thriller
- Cosmicism
