= Burg Kreuzenstein =

Castle near Leobendorf in Lower Austria, Austria

- Leobendorf, Lower Austria, Austria
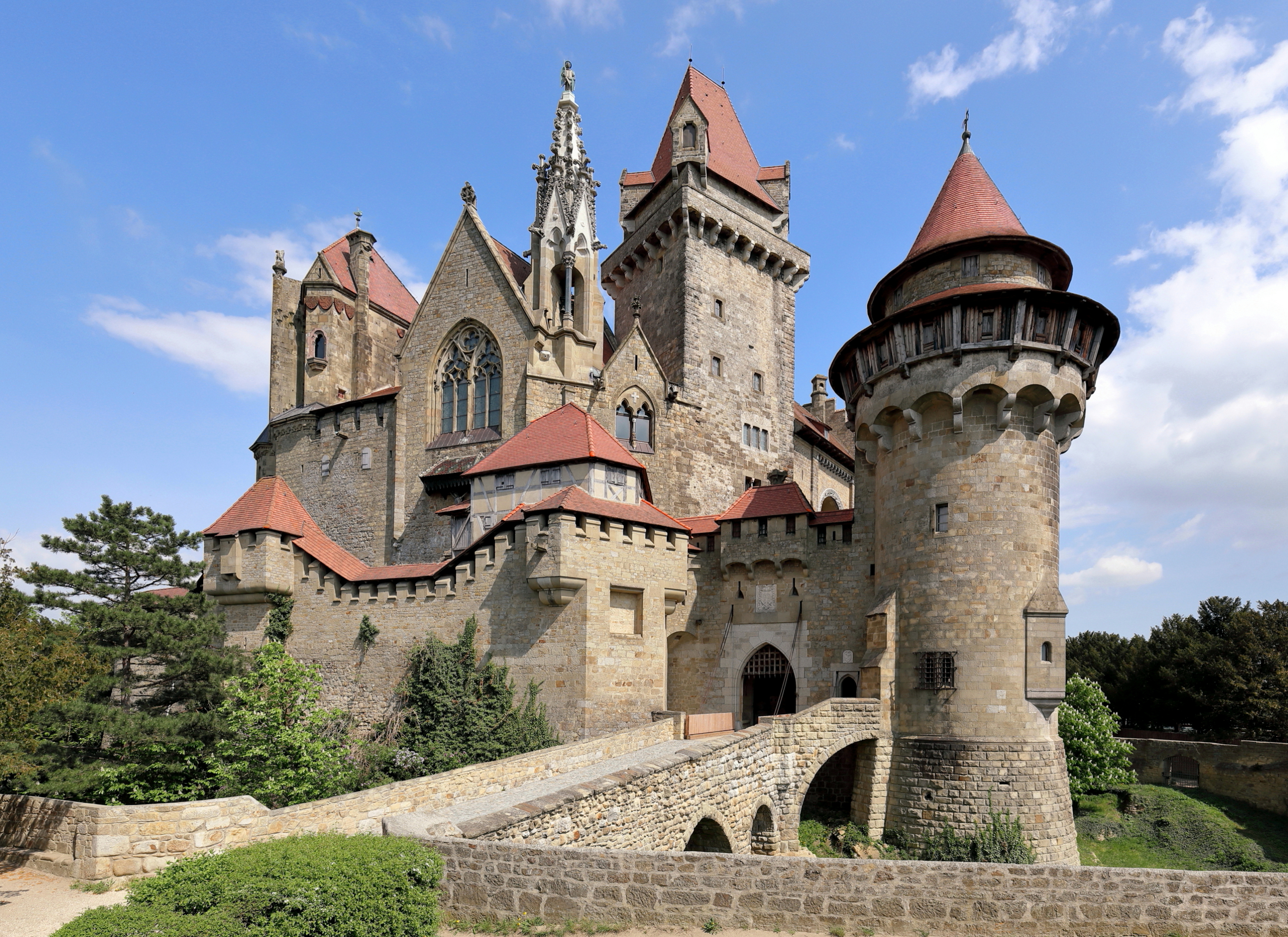

Site information
- Type: Castle

Location
- Coordinates: 48°22′45″N 16°18′32″E

Site history
- Built: 12th century

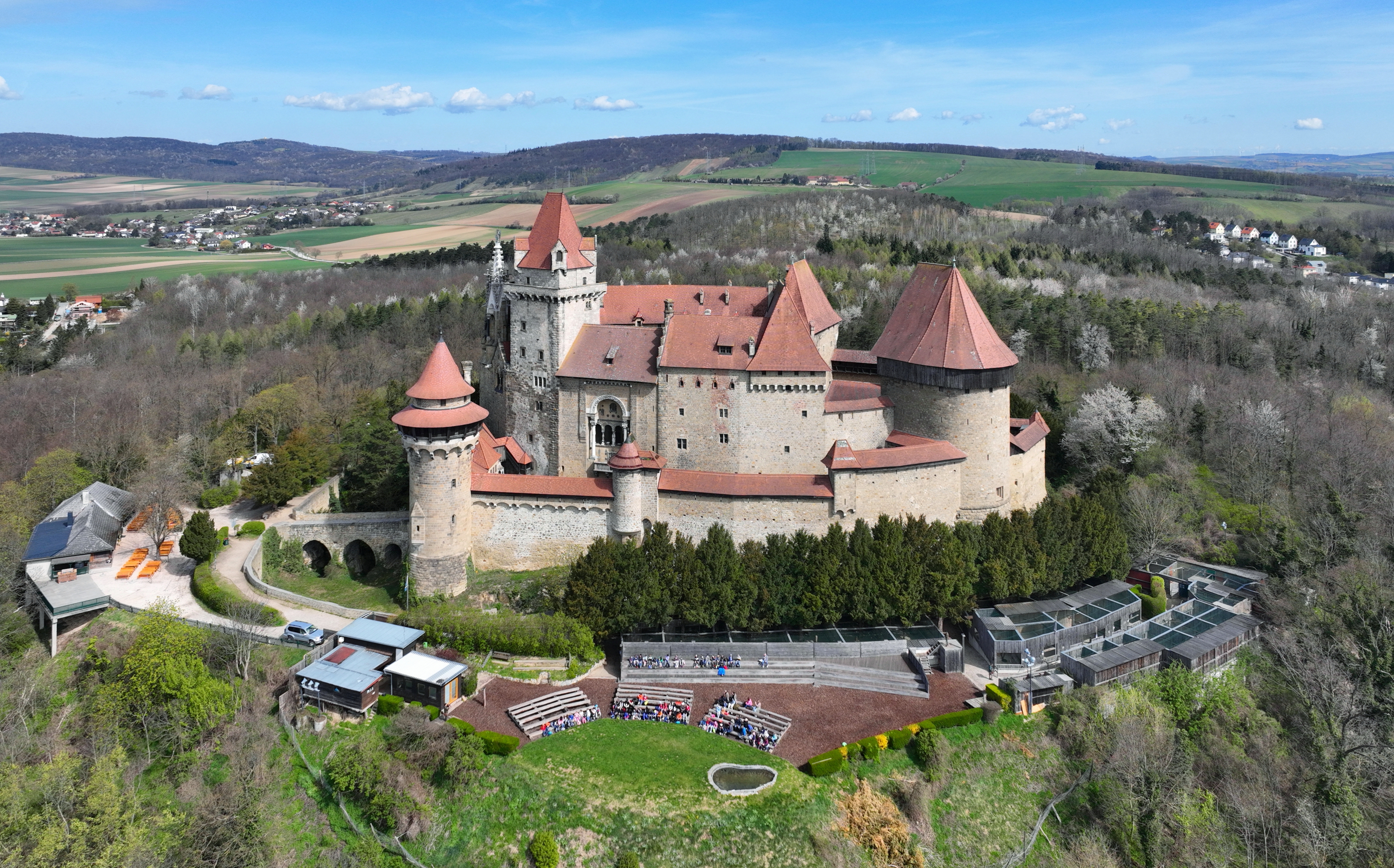
Aerial view from the south

Burg Kreuzenstein is a castle near Leobendorf in Lower Austria, Austria. Burg Kreuzenstein is 265 metres (869 ft) above sea level. It was constructed on the remains of a medieval castle that had fallen into disrepair and was then demolished during the Thirty Years' War. Intended to be a family vault for the Wilczek family, it was rebuilt in the 19th century by Count Nepomuk Wilczek with money from the family's large Silesian coal mines. Kreuzenstein is interesting in that it was constructed out of sections of medieval structures purchased by the family from all over Europe to form an authentic-looking castle. Thus, the castle can be considered both a 'neo-' and 'original' medieval structure. The castle is sometimes used as a location for films, for example in Baron Blood, directed by Mario Bava in 1972.

This castle is sometimes confused with the medieval castle Burg Liechtenstein, where the movie The Three Musketeers was filmed in 1993. Both castles used the same architect for restoration in the 19th century.

== Location ==
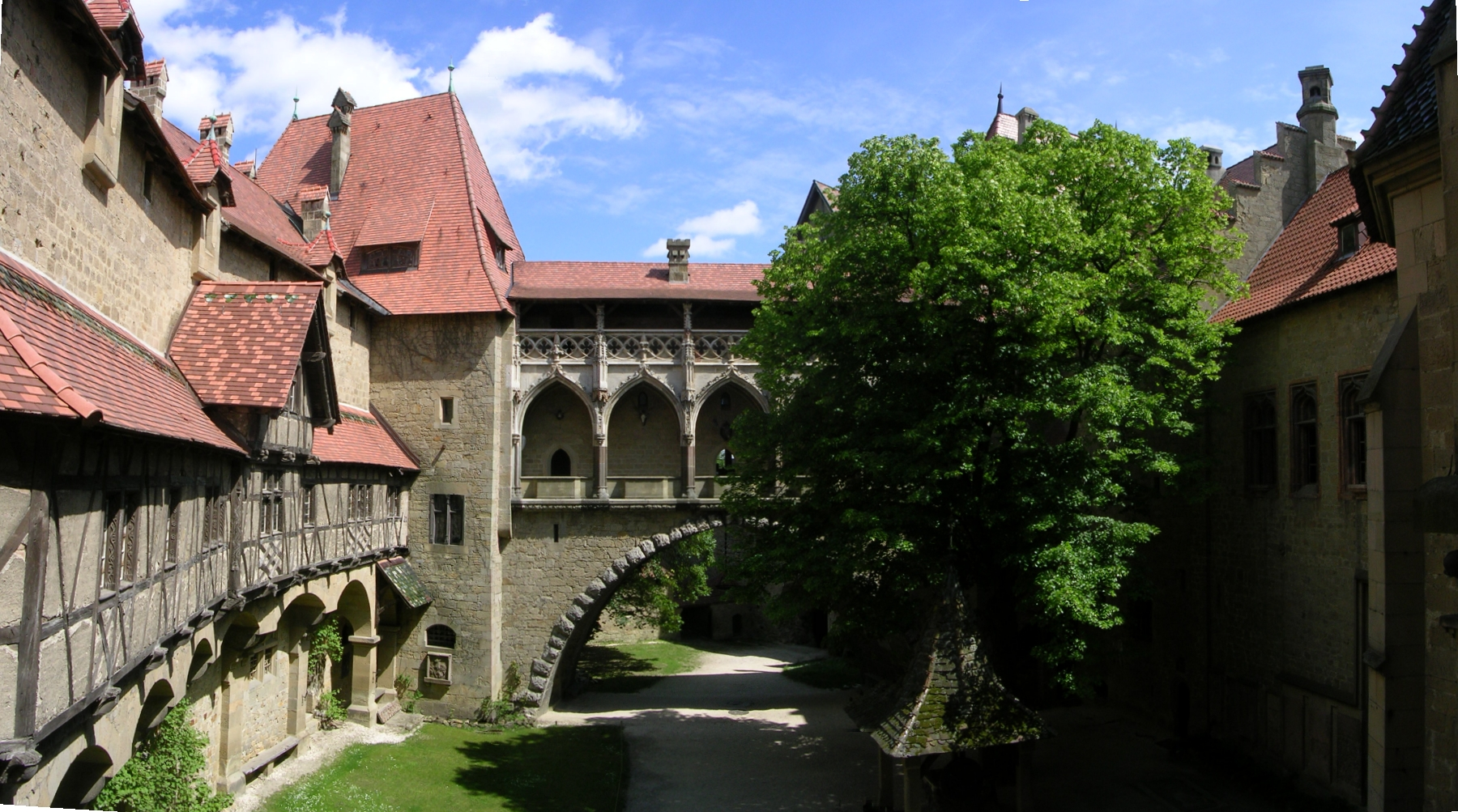
Inside

The castle is located just north of Vienna and the Danube on a rising above Rohrwald, directly above Leobendorf and between the towns of Korneuburg and Stockerau. The elevation is 266 m (AA), the height above the Danube about 100 metres (330 ft).

Close to Burg Kreuzenstein is a water gap in the Danube called Wiener Pforte ("Viennese Portal"), so that it allows a wide view of the current course of the river and the Korneuburger Becken ("Korneuburger sedimentary basin") upstream . Approximately opposite to Burg Kreuzenstein, on the south bank of the Danube, lies Burg Greifenstein castle.

== History ==
=== Medieval castle of the Habsburgs ===
The origins of Burg Kreuzenstein, like most castles in Lower Austria, date back to the 12th century. Originally built by the Counts of Formbach (now Vornbach, Bavaria), the castle passed into the possession of the Counts of Wasserburg through marriage. Through Ottokar II of Bohemia, the castle came into the possession of the Habsburgs, in 1278.

In July 1527, the Anabaptist preacher Balthasar Hubmaier was arrested under the pretext of causing riots in Mikulov, Moravia and transferred to Burg Kreuzenstein. He was interrogated there but refused to renounce his beliefs and was burned at the stake in Vienna.

Until the Thirty Years War, the castle had never been conquered but then it fell into the hands of the Swedish Field Marshal Lennart Torstensson, who, on his departure in 1645, blew up three parts of the building (some sources say four).

=== Reconstruction under the Counts of Wilczek ===
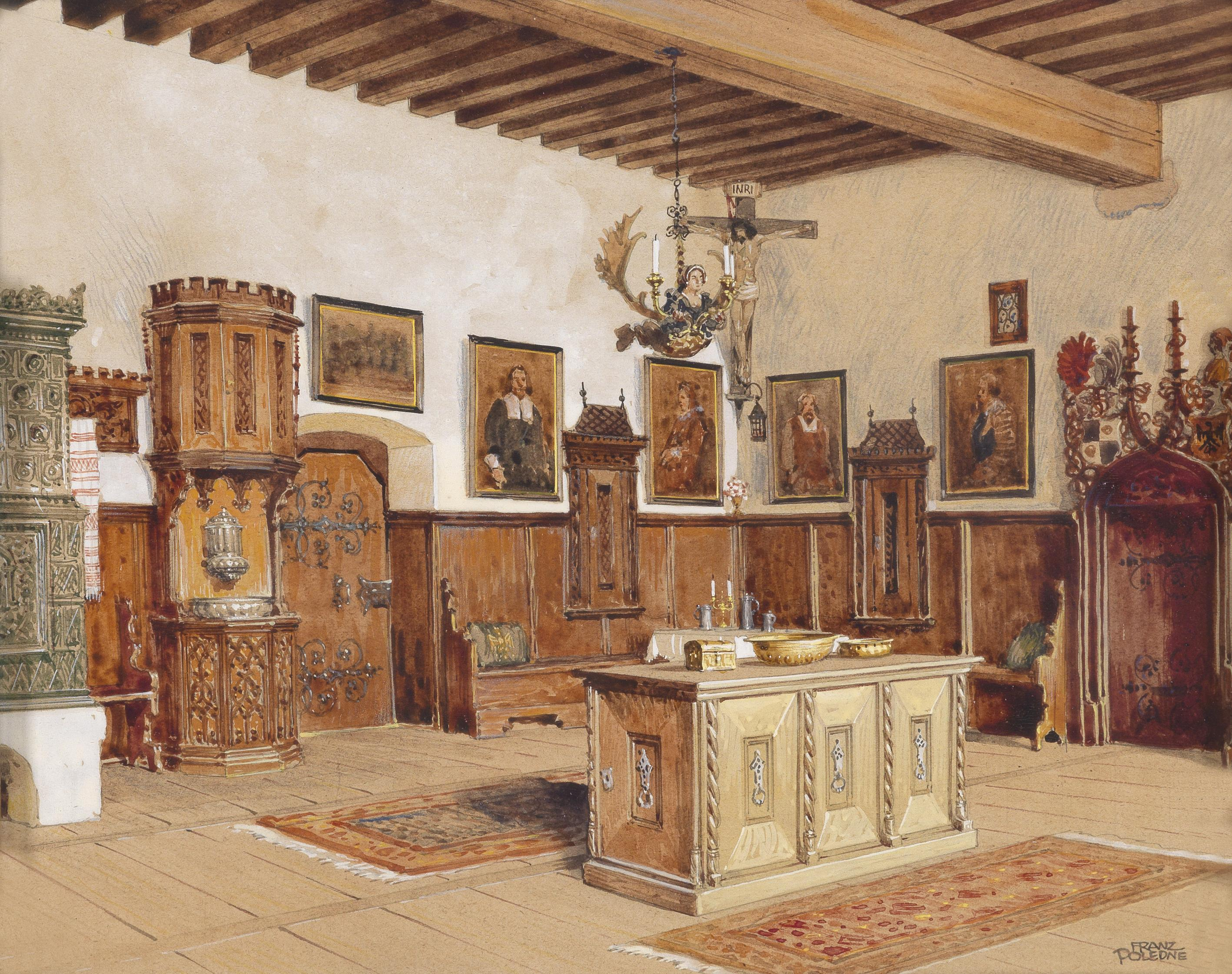
Interior of Burg Kreuzenstein by Austrian artist Franz Poledne (1873 - 1932)

In the 18th century, the castle came into the possession of the Counts of Wilczek who had amassed a large fortune through their coal mines in Silesia. In 1874, Count Johann Nepomuk Wilczek, best known as a polar explorer, began reconstruction of the castle but in a style entirely different from the original Romanesque-Gothic architecture. The existing ruins were incorporated into the new castle, in particular, parts of the outer wall, the east tower and parts of the chapel. The practised eye can easily distinguish between the surviving medieval masonry and the 19th century additions.

The reconstruction was overseen by architect Carl Gangolf Kayser, court architect of Maximilian I of Mexico, until his death in 1895. The building was then taken over by Ritter Humbert Walcher of Molthein and the artist Egon Rheinberger.

A family vault was built under the castle and Johann Wilczek is interred there. As well as building the castle from the original masonry and on the original site, Wilczek gathered building components from all over Europe. Additionally, the castle was equipped with a large collection of medieval furnishings and historical artefacts, including one of the oldest surviving medieval catapults, purchased from Hohensalzburg Castle.

The reconstruction work lasted for 30 years and Kaiser Wilhelm II was present at the reopening on 6 June 1906. A fire caused by a lightning strike in 1915, burned part of the archives and library wing.

== Burg Kreuzenstein today ==
Though now in the collection of the Austrian National Library, the conflict between the German Wehrmacht and the Red Army in 1945 resulted in the theft of several manuscripts, and some rooms of the castle were extensively damaged during the war (World War II).

Today the castle is a much-loved tourist destination and museum in the surrounding countryside of Vienna. At one time, a classical concert known as the Burgserenade was held in the great hall of the castle, at the end of June each year. This has been discontinued. Through the year from April to October, a falconry show, known as Adlerwarte Kreuzenstein is held on the estate. The recently renovated Burgtaverne Kreuzenstein is a restaurant, furnished to provide the atmosphere of a medieval tavern.

In 2013, Kreuzenstein Castle became the titular home of the Lazarus Union Knighthood of Honour.

Currently, the owner of the castle (and holder of the title) is Johan-Christian Count Wilczek.

== See also ==
- List of castles in Austria
