= South African Horrorfest =

- Location: Cape Town, South Africa
- Founded: 2005
- Language: International
- Website: horrorfest.info

The South African Horrorfest is a film festival for horror and genre films in Cape Town, South Africa. It hosts celebrities, artists, filmmakers, screenwriters, and press from the horror genre.

It is the longest running and only event of its kind in South Africa and the African continent. Moviemaker lists it as one of the "world's 50 best genre festivals 2021". The festival features new, classic and rare movies, pre-release screenings, dark literature, live silent film soundtrack performance, Halloween dress-up, give-aways and more.

== History ==
The South African Horrorfest was founded in 2005 by Paul Blom and Sonja Ruppersberg.

The festival is held annually around Halloween at the Labia Theatre Cape Town and is a permanent fixture in the arts calendar of Cape Town.

== Program ==
Since 2005, the South African Horrorfest has featured almost all Africa premieres of relevant horror features and documentaries. Examples are:

- Bad Candy
- Blood Sucking Bastards
- Clapboard Jungle
- Crabs!
- Deathcember
- Doctor Sleep
- Escape from Tomorrow
- Frankenstein's Army
- Frankenweenie
- Fulci For Fake
- Glass Coffin
- Halloween Kills
- Haunters: The Art Of The Scare
- Insidious 2
- Le Scaphandrier
- Lifechanger
- Lights Out
- Lost Soul: The Doomed Journey of Richard Stanley's Island of Dr. Moreau
- Machete
- Masking Threshold
- Nightworld
- Ouija: Origin of Evil
- Pandorum
- Razzennest
- Sky Sharks
- Slenderman
- Slumber Party Massacre (2021)
- Some Kind Of Hate
- Soulmate
- Southbound
- Strigoi
- Thanatomorphose
- The Heretics (2017)
- The History of Metal and Horror
- The Human Centipede (First Sequence)
- The Parker Sessions
- The Pizzagate Massacre
- The Possession
- The Theatre Bizarre
- Zombieland

== Awards ==
=== 2021 ===
Feature Film

Best Poster Art: The History Of Metal And Horror

Best Make-Up FX: Slumber Party Massacre – Clinton Smith & Cosmesis Studio

Production Design: Slumber Party Massacre – Robert Cardoso

Best Soundtrack: Vicious Fun – Steph Copeland

Best Documentary: Woodlands Dark & Days Bewitched – The History Of Folk Horror

Best Cinematography: Masking Threshold – Florian Hofer

Best Editing: Masking Threshold – Johannes Grenzfurthner & Florian Hofer

Best Female Lead: Yumiko Shako – in Hall

Best Male Lead: Evan Marsh – in Vicious Fun

Best Supporting Actor: Ari Millen – in Vicious Fun

Best Actress: Lee Eddy – in Pizzagate Massacre

Best Ensemble Cast: Keeping Company

Best Screenplay: Masking Threshold – Johannes Grenzfurthner & Samantha Lienhard

Best Director: Cody Callahan – for Vicious Fun

Best Feature Film: Vicious Fun

Halloween Spirit Award: Halloween Kills

Indie Spirit Award: Jason Rising

The Gorefest Award: Cyst

Best Horror Comedy: Keeping Company

Best Anthology Film Acknowledgment: Apps

Hall Of Fame Inductees:
Jamie Lee Curtis, Mick Garris

Short Film

Best Poster Art: Experiment

Best Make-Up FX: ZTV Sympathy For The Devil

Best Visual FX: #Nofilter

Best Production Design: Labyrinth

Cinematography: Lips & Tips

Best Male Lead: Hugo Nicolau – for Familiar

Best Female Lead: Kate Dickie – in Lilias Adie

Best Screenplay: #Nofilter – Nathan Crooker

Best Director: Elize Du Toit – for Lilias Adie

Best Short Film: Lips & Tips

Best South African Short: #Meowtoo – Ryan Kruger

Best Comedy Short: Pick Up Artist

Gorefest Award: Visitors

Best Music Based Short: Mensvreters' Boef Lewe Made Me Do It

Best Animated Short: Le Cri

Best 1 Minute Short: Monster Encounters

== See also ==
- List of fantastic and horror film festivals
