= Burg Greifenstein =

Castle in Lower Austria

- Lower Austria, Austria
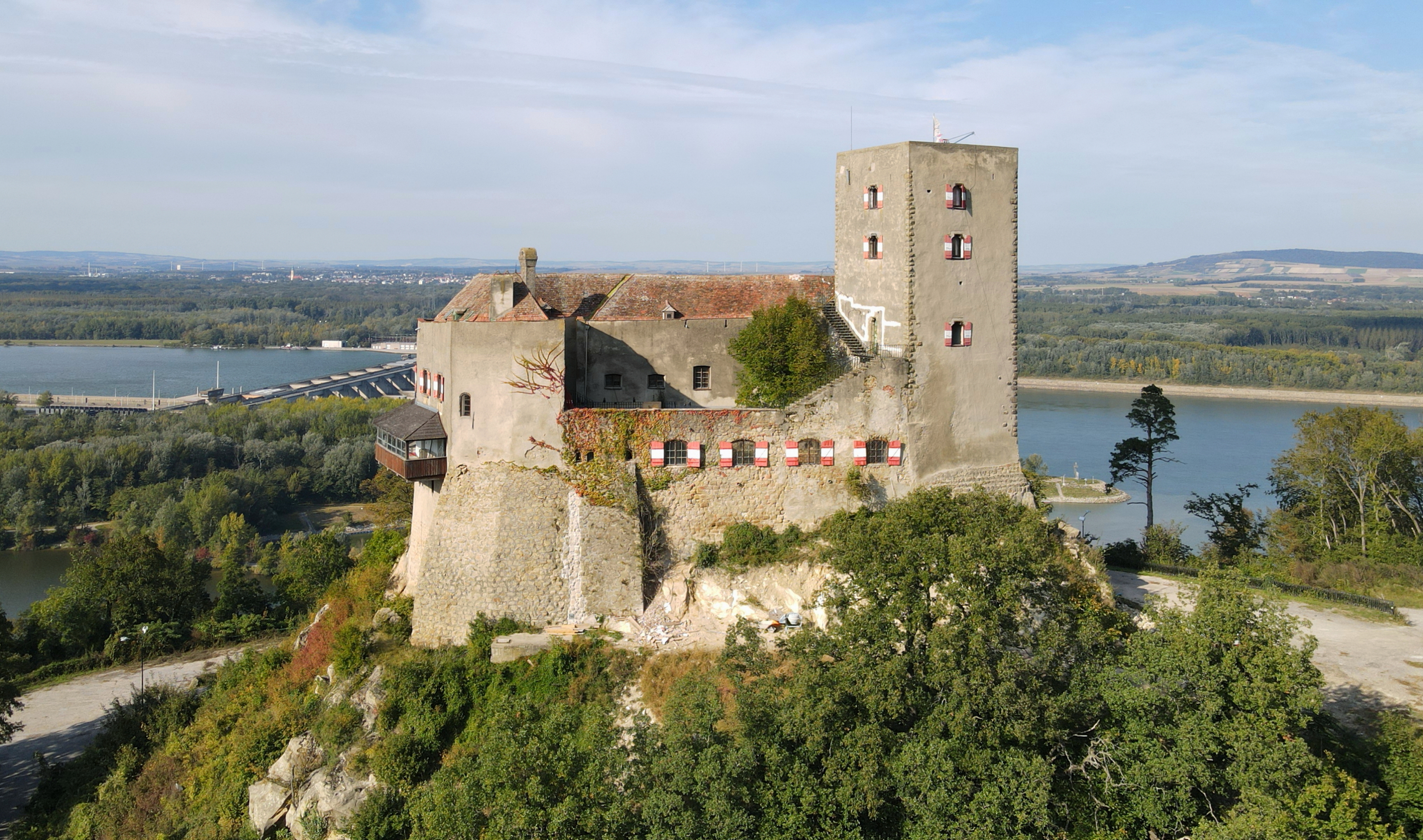
- Southeast view of Greifenstein Castle

Site information
- Type: Höhenburg (Hill Castle)
- Owner: Private
- Open to the public: No
- Condition: Inaccessible

Location
- Coordinates: 48°20′58″N 16°15′16″E

Site history
- Built: Around 1000-1050 AD
- Built by: Unknown
- In use: 11th Century-1918

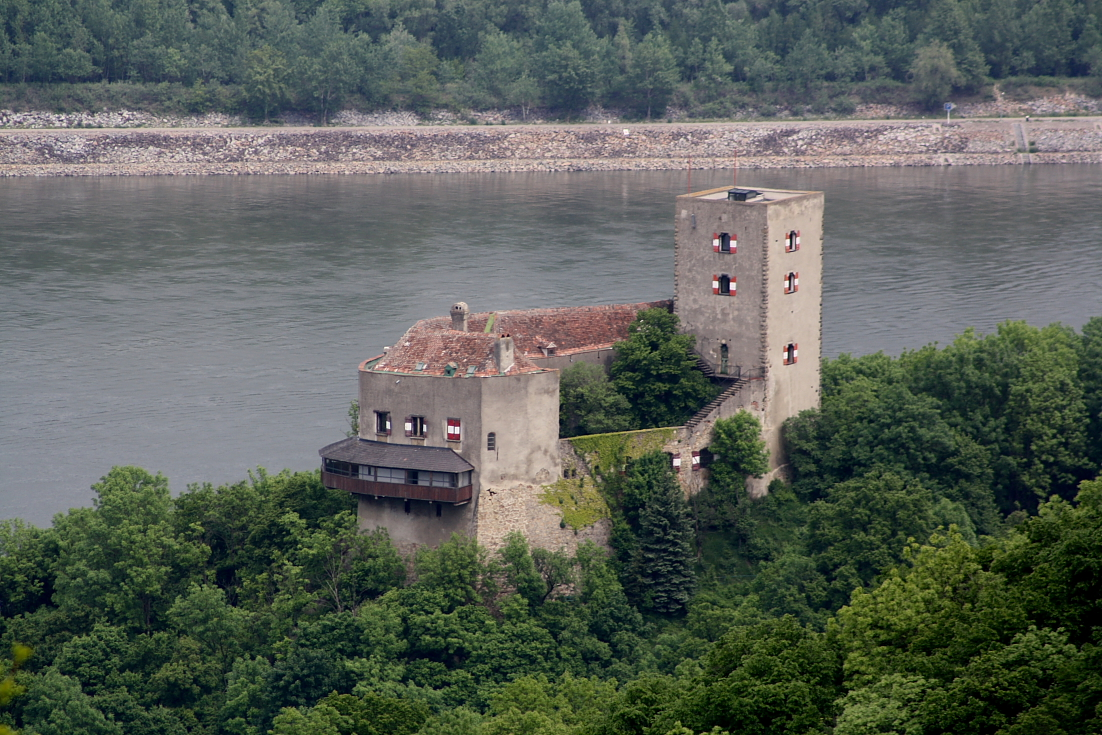
Southwest side of the castle

Burg Greifenstein is a castle in Lower Austria, Austria, overlooking the Danube. Burg Greifenstein is 227 metres (745 ft) above sea level. Approximately opposite to Burg Greifenstein is Burg Kreuzenstein, on the north shore of the Danube.

== History ==
=== Early ===
The castle is thought to have been built around the 11th Century, and was first mentioned in 1135. However, the owners of the castle changed owners frequently during its service from the 11th century to 1918. It began life playing a significant role in the defense system along the Danube.

More recently, in the 16th century, the castle served primarily as a notorious prison of the ecclesiastical court. Throughout history, the castle was repeatedly invaded and damaged, but repaired, again and again. It was inhabited until about 1770, when it was abandoned and fell into disrepair. Until 1803, it belonged to the Bishops of Passau.

Johann I von Liechtenstein refurbished it in 1807–08 in the Romantic style but at the end of the 19th century, the castle fell again and was sold in 1918, coming into private ownership.

=== Recent ===
A conflagration in the castle on 16 September 2006 rendered the castle inaccessible. The castle has remained in private ownership and is presumed to be on sale.

== See also ==
- List of castles in Austria
