= Leitzersdorf =

- Municipality
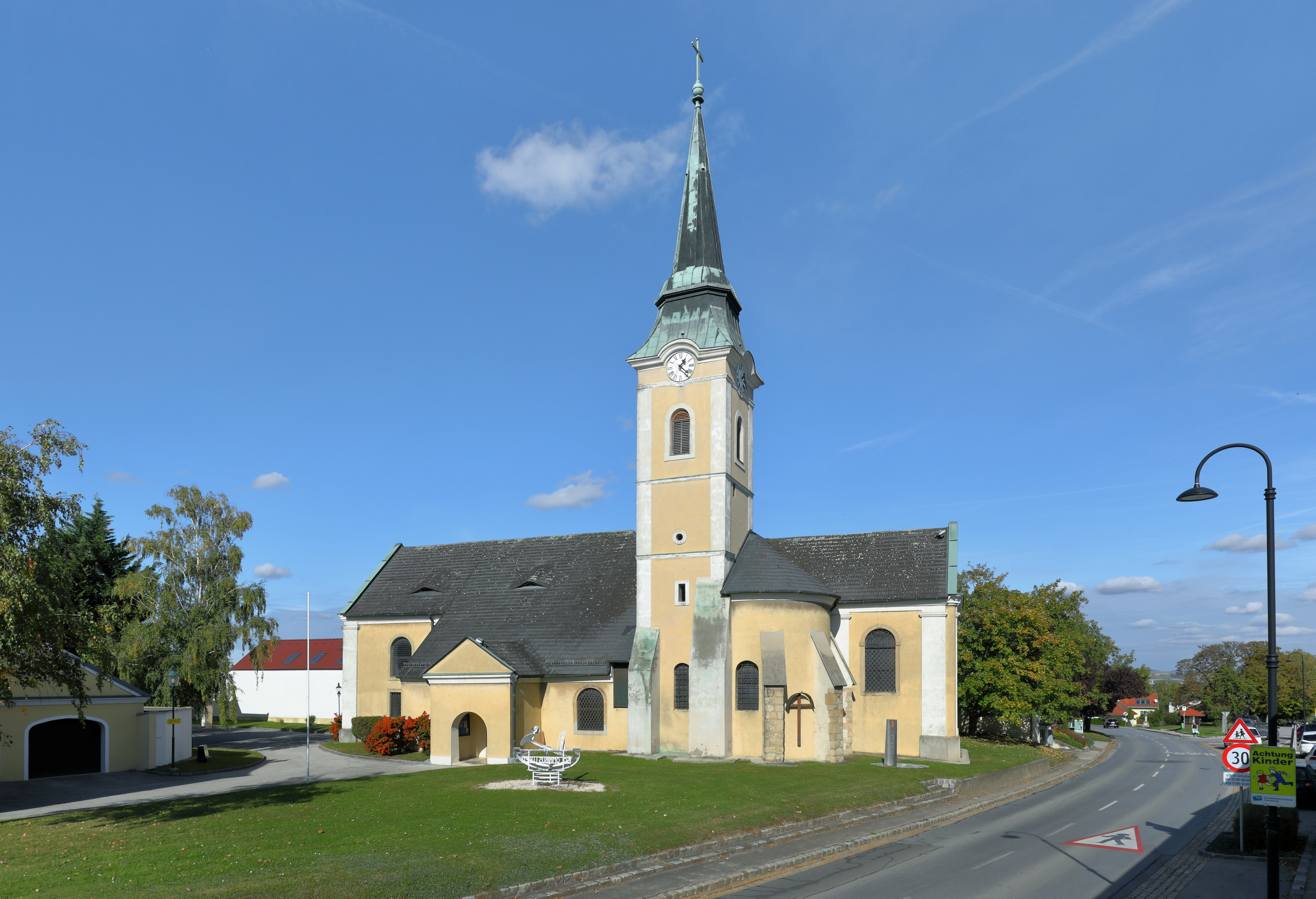
- The parish church in the center of Leitzersdorf

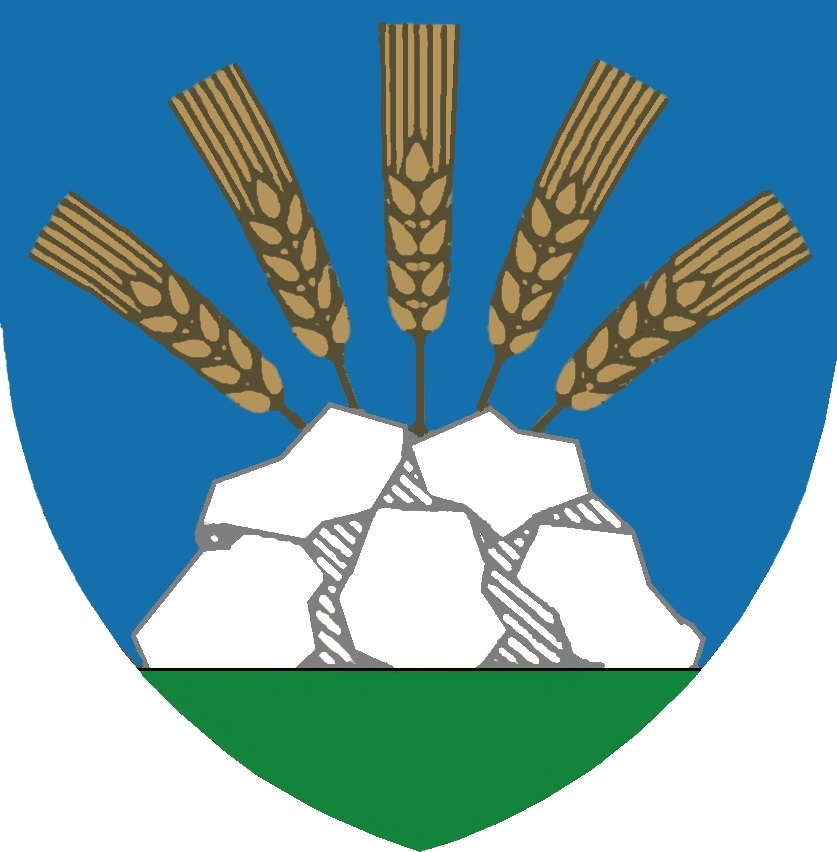
- Coat of arms

- Location within Austria
- Coordinates: 48°25′N 16°15′E
- Country: Austria
- State: Lower Austria
- District: Korneuburg

Government
  - Mayor: Günter Glasl

Area
  - Total: 27.87 km^{2} (10.76 sq mi)
- Elevation: 227 m (745 ft)

Population (2018-01-01)
  - Total: 1,204
  - Density: 43.20/km^{2} (111.9/sq mi)
- Time zone: UTC+1 (CET)
  - Summer (DST): UTC+2 (CEST)
- Postal code: 2003
- Area code: 02266
- Website: www.leitzersdorf.at

Leitzersdorf is a town in the district of Korneuburg in the Austrian state of Lower Austria.

== Population ==
Historical population
Year	Pop.	±%
1869	1,236	—
1880	1,235	−0.1%
1890	1,274	+3.2%
1900	1,256	−1.4%
1910	1,372	+9.2%
1923	1,434	+4.5%
1934	1,284	−10.5%
1939	1,179	−8.2%
1951	1,117	−5.3%
1961	1,014	−9.2%
1971	974	−3.9%
1981	954	−2.1%
1991	1,065	+11.6%
2001	1,098	+3.1%
2011	1,272	+15.8%
2021	1,150	−9.6%
