= Cucalorus Film Festival =

Annual film and art festival held in Wilmington, North Carolina, USA

- Location: Wilmington, North Carolina, U.S.
- Founded: 1994
- Language: International
- Website: www.cucalorus.org

The Cucalorus Film Festival is a film festival held annually in Wilmington, North Carolina. It is one of the largest film festivals in the U.S. South and recognized as a destination film festival for indie filmmakers. MovieMaker magazine recognizes it as "one of the coolest film festivals in the world", and "one of 50 film festivals worth the entry fee". The Brooks Institute named it one of the top ten film festivals in the nation.

Dan Brawley is currently the head ("chief instigator") of the festival.

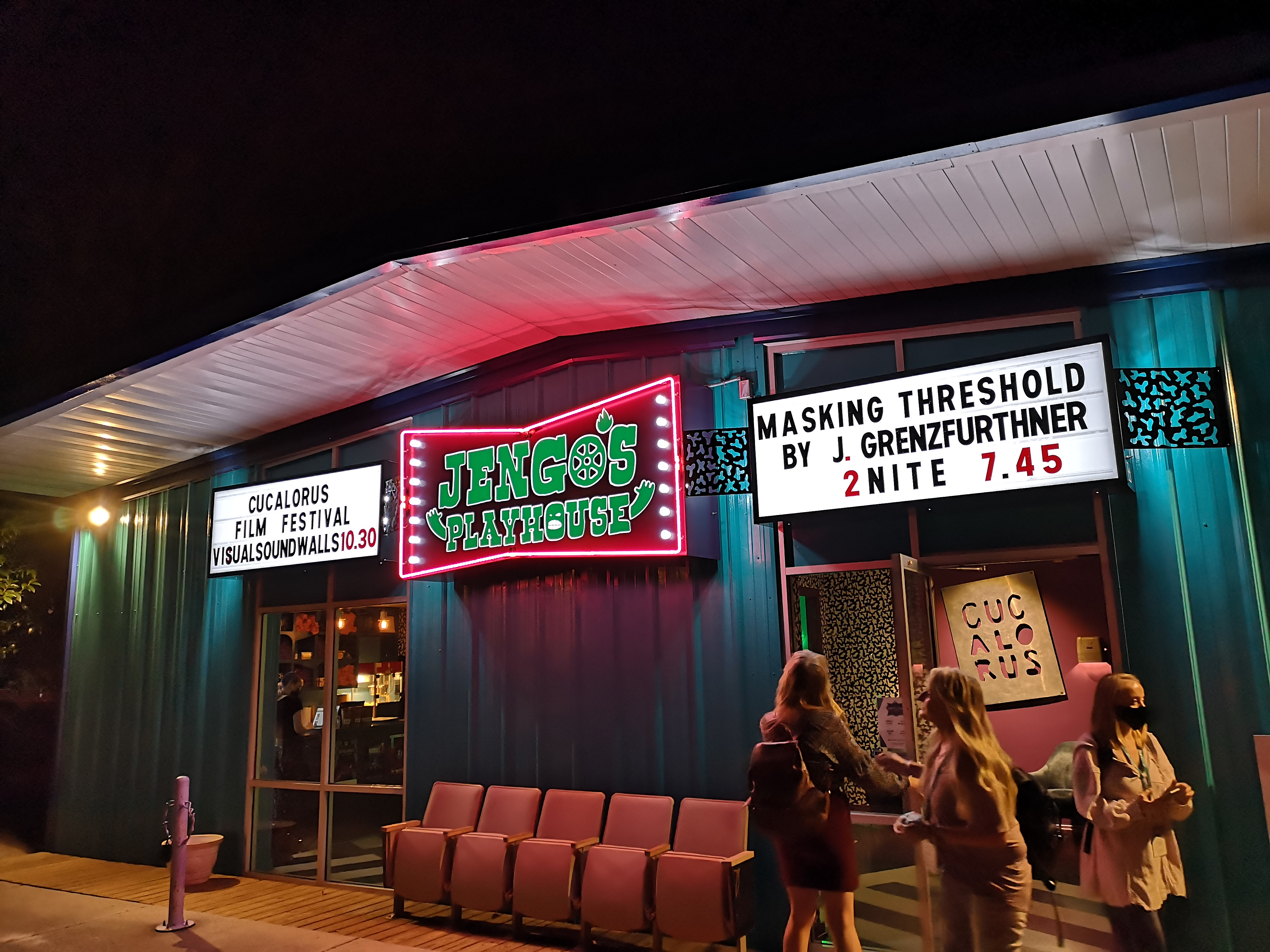
Jengo's Playhouse in Wilmington, NC during Cucalorus Film Festival 2021

== Purpose ==
The Cucalorus Film Festival presents around 150 independent films each year, often controversial, and putting an emphasis on supporting films directed by women and by people of color. The festival also showcases performance art, fringe-style theatre and panels about social justice.

== History ==
The festival was founded in 1994 by independent filmmaker collective Twinkle Doon. The first official Cucalorus was one standing-room-only night of locally made indie films dubbed "An Evening of Celluloid Art: a film festival for open minds." Since then, the event expanded to multiple venues in Wilmington and became a permanent fixture in the arts calendar of the town.

The event grew into an interdisciplinary foundation supporting innovation in film, arts and performance and business with programming throughout the year.

Aaron Hillis is one of the festival programmers and curates the "Convulsions" genre program since 2013.

The festival's name is a reference to the term "cucoloris."
