= Niederhollabrunn =

- Municipality
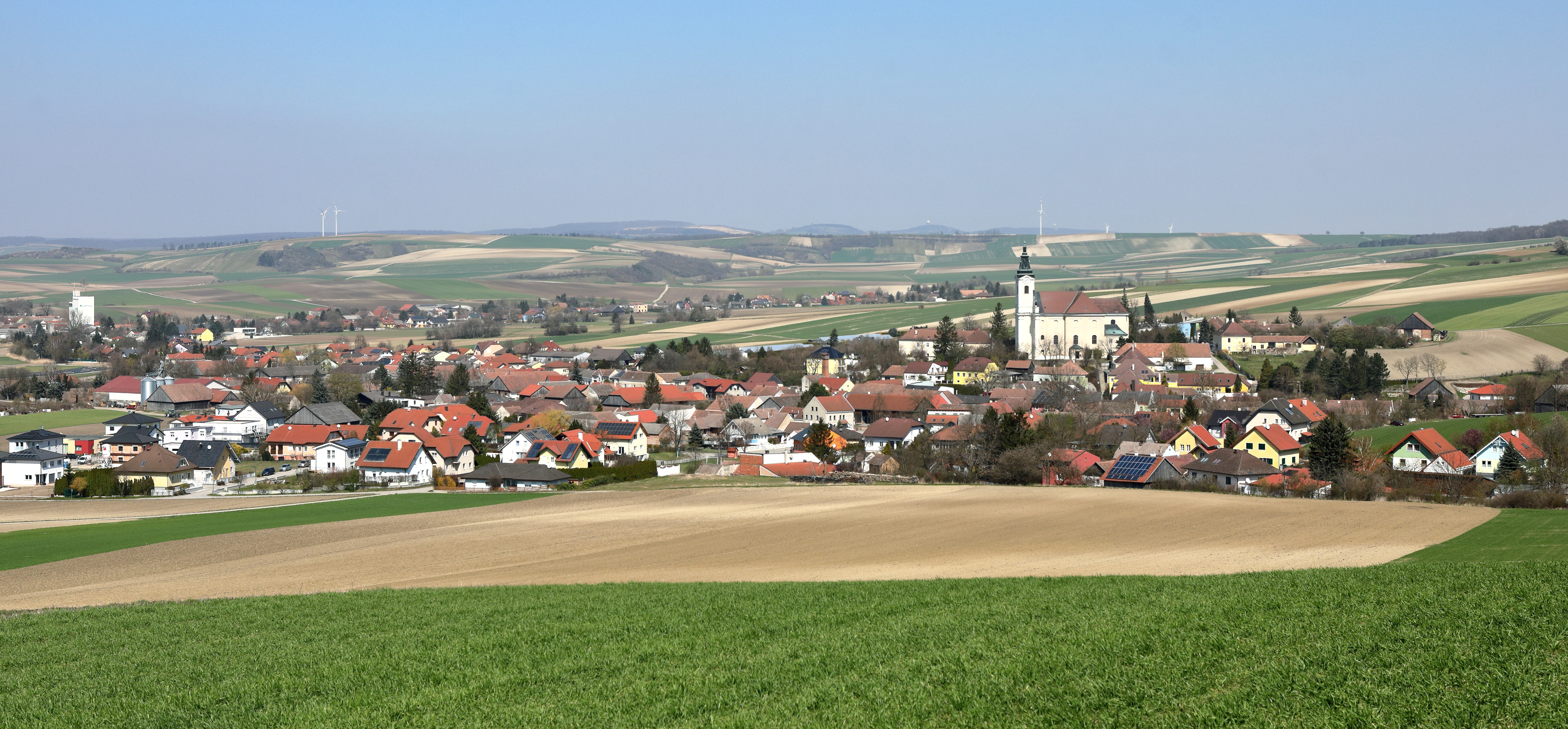

- Coat of arms

- Location within Austria
- Coordinates: 48°27′N 16°18′E
- Country: Austria
- State: Lower Austria
- District: Korneuburg

Government
  - Mayor: Franz Zinnerer

Area
  - Total: 50.36 km^{2} (19.44 sq mi)
- Elevation: 242 m (794 ft)

Population (2018-01-01)
  - Total: 1,534
  - Density: 30.46/km^{2} (78.89/sq mi)
- Time zone: UTC+1 (CET)
  - Summer (DST): UTC+2 (CEST)
- Postal code: 2004
- Area code: 02269

Niederhollabrunn is a town in the district of Korneuburg in the Austrian state of Lower Austria.

== Population ==
Historical population
| Year | Pop. | ±% |
|---|---|---|
| 1869 | 2,111 | — |
| 1880 | 2,256 | +6.9% |
| 1890 | 2,420 | +7.3% |
| 1900 | 2,206 | −8.8% |
| 1910 | 2,312 | +4.8% |
| 1923 | 2,349 | +1.6% |
| 1934 | 2,117 | −9.9% |
| 1939 | 2,063 | −2.6% |
| 1951 | 1,810 | −12.3% |
| 1961 | 1,543 | −14.8% |
| 1971 | 1,337 | −13.4% |
| 1981 | 1,289 | −3.6% |
| 1991 | 1,323 | +2.6% |
| 2001 | 1,495 | +13.0% |
| 2011 | 1,591 | +6.4% |
| 2021 | 1,548 | −2.7% |
