= Leobendorf =

- Municipality
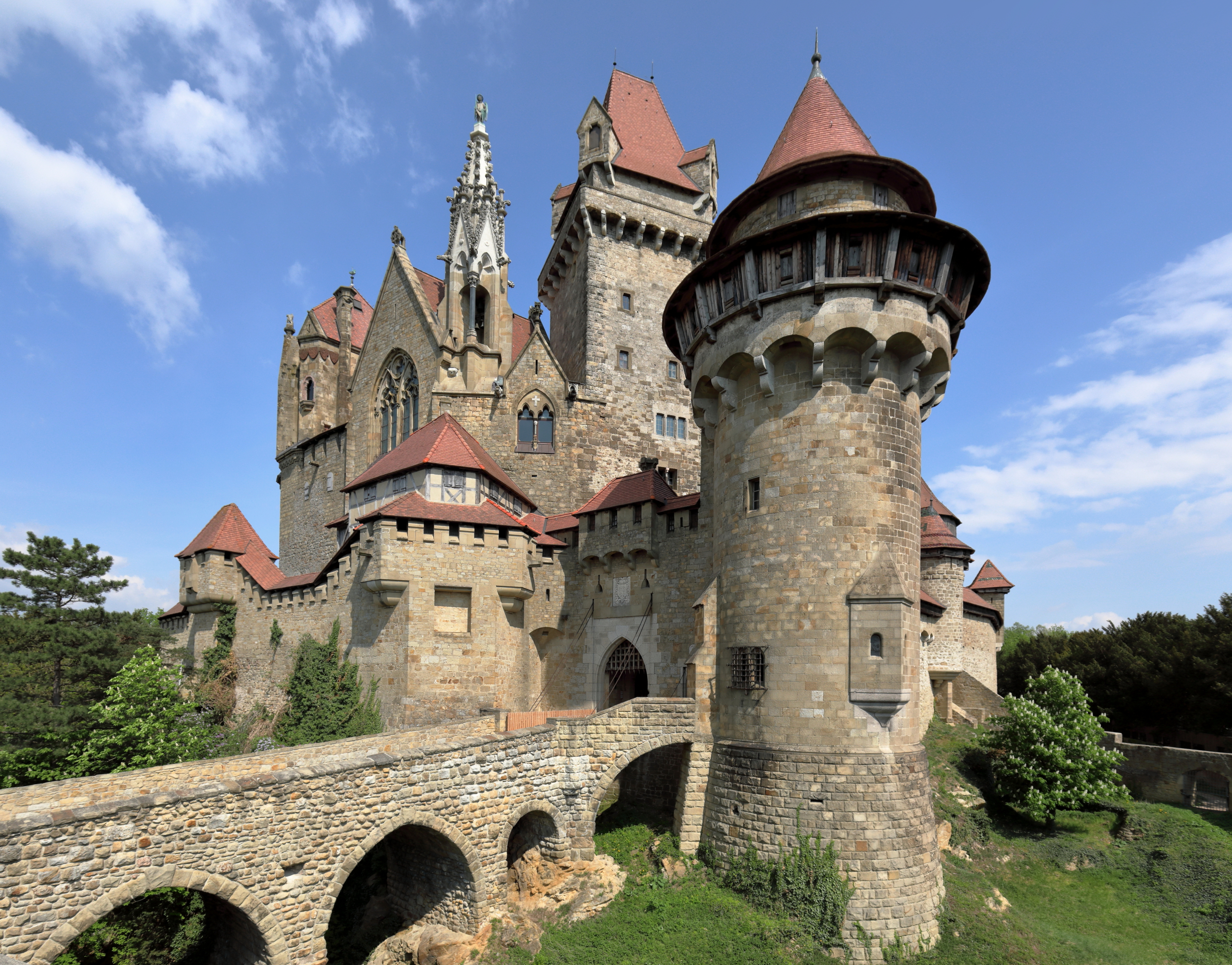
- Kreuzenstein Castle

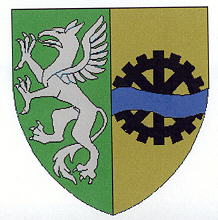
- Coat of arms

- Location within Austria
- Coordinates: 48°23′N 16°19′E
- Country: Austria
- State: Lower Austria
- District: Korneuburg

Government
  - Mayor: Magdalena Batoha (ÖVP)

Area
  - Total: 29.94 km^{2} (11.56 sq mi)
- Elevation: 187 m (614 ft)

Population (2018-01-01)
  - Total: 4,847
  - Density: 161.9/km^{2} (419.3/sq mi)
- Time zone: UTC+1 (CET)
  - Summer (DST): UTC+2 (CEST)
- Postal code: 2108
- Area code: 02262
- Website: www.leobendorf.at

Leobendorf is a town in the district of Korneuburg in the Austrian state of Lower Austria.

== Geography ==
Leobendorf is located in the region of Weinviertel in Lower Austria. The area of the town covers 29.96 square kilometers. About 19% of the municipality is forested.

== History ==
Leobendorf was first mentioned in a document in 1142. The history of Leobendorf is closely linked to the castle and the lordship of Kreuzenstein. The parish of Leobendorf was founded around the middle of the 11th century and was the mother parish for the eastern part of the territory of the Formbachers in the Kreuzenstein-Bisamberg area. In 1260, King Ottokar II of Bohemia handed over the right of patronage to the Teutonic Order.

== Population ==
Historical population
Year	Pop.	±%
1869	1,658	—
1880	1,735	+4.6%
1890	1,926	+11.0%
1900	2,150	+11.6%
1910	2,253	+4.8%
1923	2,393	+6.2%
1934	2,261	−5.5%
1939	2,208	−2.3%
1951	2,146	−2.8%
1961	2,236	+4.2%
1971	2,480	+10.9%
1981	3,180	+28.2%
1991	3,594	+13.0%
2001	4,284	+19.2%
2011	4,793	+11.9%
2021	4,973	+3.8%

== Notable people ==
- Johann Nepomuk Wilczek (1837–1922), builder of Kreuzenstein Castle; is buried there
- Alfons Gabriel (1894–1975), geographer and explorer; ran a medical practice in Leobendorf
