= List of Austrian women artists =

This is a list of women artists who were born in Austria or whose artworks are closely associated with that country.

== A ==
- Erika Abels d'Albert (1896–1975), painter and graphic designer
- Soshana Afroyim (1927–2015), painter
- Maria Anwander (born 1980), conceptual artist
- Marie von Augustin (1810–1886), painter

== B ==
- Maria Bach (1896–1978), painter
- Maria Baumgartner (born 1952), ceramist and academic
- Luise Begas-Parmentier (1843–1920), Austrian-German painter and salonière
- Maria Biljan-Bilger (1912–1997), ceramist and sculptor
- Tina Blau (1845–1916), painter
- Emma Bormann (1887–1974), art teacher and printmaker
- Eugenie Breithut-Munk (1867–1915), painter
- Norbertine Bresslern-Roth (1891–1978), painter, print maker

== C ==
- Eva Maria Düringer Cavalli (born 1959), fashion designer
- Katharina Cibulka (born 1975), installation artist
- Isabel Czerwenka-Wenkstetten (born 1969), visual artist

== D ==
- Gabriele Maria Deininger-Arnhard (1855–1945), German-Austrian painter
- Gerti Deutsch (1908–1979), photographer
- Friedl Dicker-Brandeis (1898–1944), painter
- Irma von Duczynska (1869–1932), painter and sculptor

== E ==
- Marie Egner (1850–1940), painter
- Bettina Ehrlich (1903–1985), painter and illustrator
- Ursula Endlicher, multi-media
- Marianne von Eschenburg (1856–1937), painter
- Valie Export (born 1940), video and performance artist

== F ==
- Marina Faust (born 1950), photographer
- Emilie Louise Flöge (1874–1952), fashion designer
- Mathilde Flögl (1893–1958), artist and graphic designer
- Louise Fraenkel-Hahn (1878–1939), painter
- Gustl French (1909–2004), Austrian-American painter, printmaker and photographer
- Camilla Friedländer (1856–1928), painter
- Hedwig Friedländer(1863–1916), painter
- Hortensia Fussy (born 1954), sculptor

== G ==
- Olga Granner (1874–1967), portrait painter who married the Swedish sculptor Carl Milles
- Hilda Goldwag (1912–2008), painter
- Herta Groves (1920–2016), Austrian-British milliner
- Eva Grubinger (born 1970), installation artist
- Nilbar Gures (born 1977), multi-media

== H ==
- Renate Habinger (born 1957), illustrator, graphic artist
- Jasmin Hagendorfer, installation art, sculptor, performance artist
- Alice Berger Hammerschlag (1917–1969), abstract painter
- Margarete Hamerschlag (1902–1958), painter, illustrator
- Karin Hannak (born 1940), multi-media
- Fanny Harlfinger-Zakucka (1873–1954), painter and graphic artist
- Hermine Heller-Ostersetzer (1874–1909), painter and graphic artist
- Mercedes Helnwein (born 1979), creator of large-scale drawings
- Gertrud Höchsmann (1902–1990), fashion designer
- Nina Hollein (born 1971), fashion designer
- Stephanie Hollenstein (1886–1944), Expressionist painter

== J ==
- Karin Jarl-Sakellarios (1885–1948), sculptor
- Hildegard Joos (1909–2005), painter
- Birgit Jürgenssen (1949–2003), photographer, painter, graphic artist and teacher

== K ==
- Betty Kurth (1878-1948) art historian, expert in decorative arts and rugs
- Dora Kallmus (1881–1963), photographer
- Johanna Kampmann-Freund (1888–1940), painter
- Ernestine von Kirchsberg (1857–1924), painter
- Kiki Kogelnik (1935–1997), painter, sculptor and printmaker
- Sacha Kolin (1911–1981), painter
- Broncia Koller-Pinell (1863–1934), painter
- Irma Komlosy (1850–1919), painter
- Michaela Konrad (born 1972), contemporary artist
- Frida Konstantin (1884–1918), painter
- Brigitte Kowanz (1957–2022), contemporary artist
- Barbara Krafft (1764–1825), painter
- Grete Wolf Krakauer (1890–1970), painter
- Edith Kramer (1916–2014), painter and art therapist
- Ilona Kronstein (1897–1948), Budapest-born painter
- Elke Krystufek (born 1970), conceptual artist
- Felicitas Kuhn (1926–2022), illustrator

== L ==
- Maria Lassnig (1919–2014), painter
- Gisela Falke von Lilienstein (1871–?), ceramicist, designer
- Lia (fl. 1990–), software artist
- Roberta Lima (born 1974), video and performance artist
- Lea von Littrow (1860–1914), painter
- Ulli Lust (born 1967), cartoonist
- Mariette Lydis (1887–1970), Austrian-Argentine painter

== M ==
- Marianne Maderna (born 1944), sculptor and illustrator
- Anna Mahler (1904–1988), sculptor
- Nadja Maleh (born 1972), actress, singer, cabaret artist and director
- Margarete Markl (1902–1981), sculptor
- Paula Maly (1891–1974), painter
- Henriette Mankiewicz (1852-1906), art embroiderer
- Gerda Matejka-Felden (1901–1984), painter
- Ursula Mayer (born 1970), multimedia artist
- Rosa Mayreder (1858–1938), painter
- Emilie Mediz-Pelikan (1861–1908), painter
- Moje Menhardt (born 1934), painter
- Olga Milles (1874–1967), portrait painter
- Elizabeth Burger Monath (1907–1986), illustrator
- Inge Morath (1923–2002), photographer
- Marie-Louise von Motesiczky (1906–1996), painter
- Bertha Müller (1848–1925), painter
- Birgit C. Muller (fl 2000s), fashion designer
- Marie Müller (1847–1935), painter
- Ulrike Müller (born 1971), mixed-media artist
- Agnes Muthspiel (1914–1966), painter

== N ==
- Juliana Neuhuber (born 1979), artist and filmmaker
- Gertrud Natzler (1908–1971), Austrian-American ceramist

== O ==
- Vevean Oviette (1902–1986), painter, print maker

== P ==
- Maria Petschnig (born 1977), video artist
- Margot Pilz (born 1936), visual artist
- Martina Pippal (born 1957), painter, sculptor and art historian
- Lisa von Pott (1888–?), sculptor
- Adrienne von Pötting (1856–1909), painter
- Teresa Präauer (born 1979), writer and visual artist

== R ==
- Caroline Ramersdorfer (born 1960), sculptor
- Elise Ransonnet-Villez (1843–1899), painter
- Barbara Rapp (born 1972), mixed-media artist
- Lily Renée (1921–2022), illustrator and writer
- Lili Réthi (1894–1969), artist and illustrator
- Lucie Rie (1902–1995), potter
- Elli Riehl (1902–1977), painter
- Teresa Feoderovna Ries (1874–1956), sculptor

== S ==
- Frieda Salvendy (1887–1968), painter
- Karin Schäfer (born 1963), performance artist
- Therese Schachner (1869–1950), painter
- Martina Schettina (born 1961), mixed media artist
- Emma Schlangenhausen (1882–1947), graphic artist
- Lene Schneider-Kainer (1885–1971), painter
- Gaby Schreiber (1904–1976), industrial and interior designer
- Elfriede Schuselka (born 1940), painter, printmaker
- Barbara Schurz (born 1973), performance artist and writer
- Rosa Schweninger (1849–1918), painter
- Deborah Sengl (born 1974), painter and sculptor
- Jutta Sika (1877–1964), graphic designer, ceramist, painter, fashion designer
- Susi Singer (1891–1955), Austrian-American ceramist
- Tamuna Sirbiladze (1971–2016), Georgian-Austrian painter
- Anna Stainer-Knittel (1841–1915), painter
- Edith Stauber (born 1968), film director and illustrator
- Martina Steckholzer (born 1974), artist
- Lilly Steiner (1884–1961), painter
- Evelin Stermitz (born 1972), video and performance artist
- Marguerite Stix (1904–1975), sculptor, jeweller and ceramist
- Ceija Stojka (1933–2013), painter, writer and musician
- Marianne Stokes (1855–1927), painter
- Josefine Swoboda (1861–1924), painter

== T ==
- Ernestine Tahedl (born 1940), Austrian-Canadian painter
- Bertha von Tarnóczy (1846–1936), art teacher and painter
- Helene von Taussig (1879–1942), painter
- Ottilie Tolansky (1912–1977), painter
- Hede von Trapp (1877–1947), painter, illustrator and poet
- Edith Tudor Hart (1908–1973), photographer and spy
- Esin Turan (born 1970), sculptor and painter
- Ilse Twardowski-Conrat (1880–1942), sculptor

== U ==
- Carola Unterberger-Probst (born 1978), new media artist and philosopher

== V ==
- Helena Kottler Vurnik (1882–1962), Austrian-Slovenian illustrator and painter

== W ==
- Rosina Wachtmeister (born 1939), sculptor, painter
- Trude Waehner(1900–1979), painter
- Pepi Weixlgärtner-Neutra (1886–1981), Austrian-Swedish graphic designer, painter, sculptor
- Susanne Wenger (1915–2009), painter and sculptor
- Vally Wieselthier (1895–1945), Austrian-American ceramist
- Elisabeth Wild (1922–2020), collage artist
- Grete Wilhelm (1887–1942), painter
- Olga Wisinger-Florian (1844–1926), painter
- Grete Wolf Krakauer (1890–1970), painter
- Marie Elisabeth Wrede (1898–1981), portrait painter

== Z ==
- Franziska Zach (1900–1930), painter
- Lisbeth Zwerger (born 1954), illustrator

== See also ==
- List of Austrian women photographers
