= Komlosy =

Komlosy or Komlósy is a surname, a simplified form of Hungarian surname Komlóssy. Notable people with the surname include:

- Aret Komlosy (born 1977), British-Nigerian singer/songwriter, actress, model, and producer
- Irma Komlosy (1850–1919), Austrian painter
- Zsolt Komlósy (1955–2005), Slovak politician
