= Duczyński =

Duczyński (feminine: Duczyńska; plural: Duczyńscy) is a Polish surname. It may refer to:

- Ilona Duczyńska (1897–1978), Polish-Hungarian female revolutionary and translator
- Irma von Duczynska (1869–1932), Austrian painter and sculptor
- Teodor Duczyński (died 1832), Polish politician
- Zygmunt Duczyński (1951–2006), Polish theatre producer
