= Master of Heiligenkreuz =

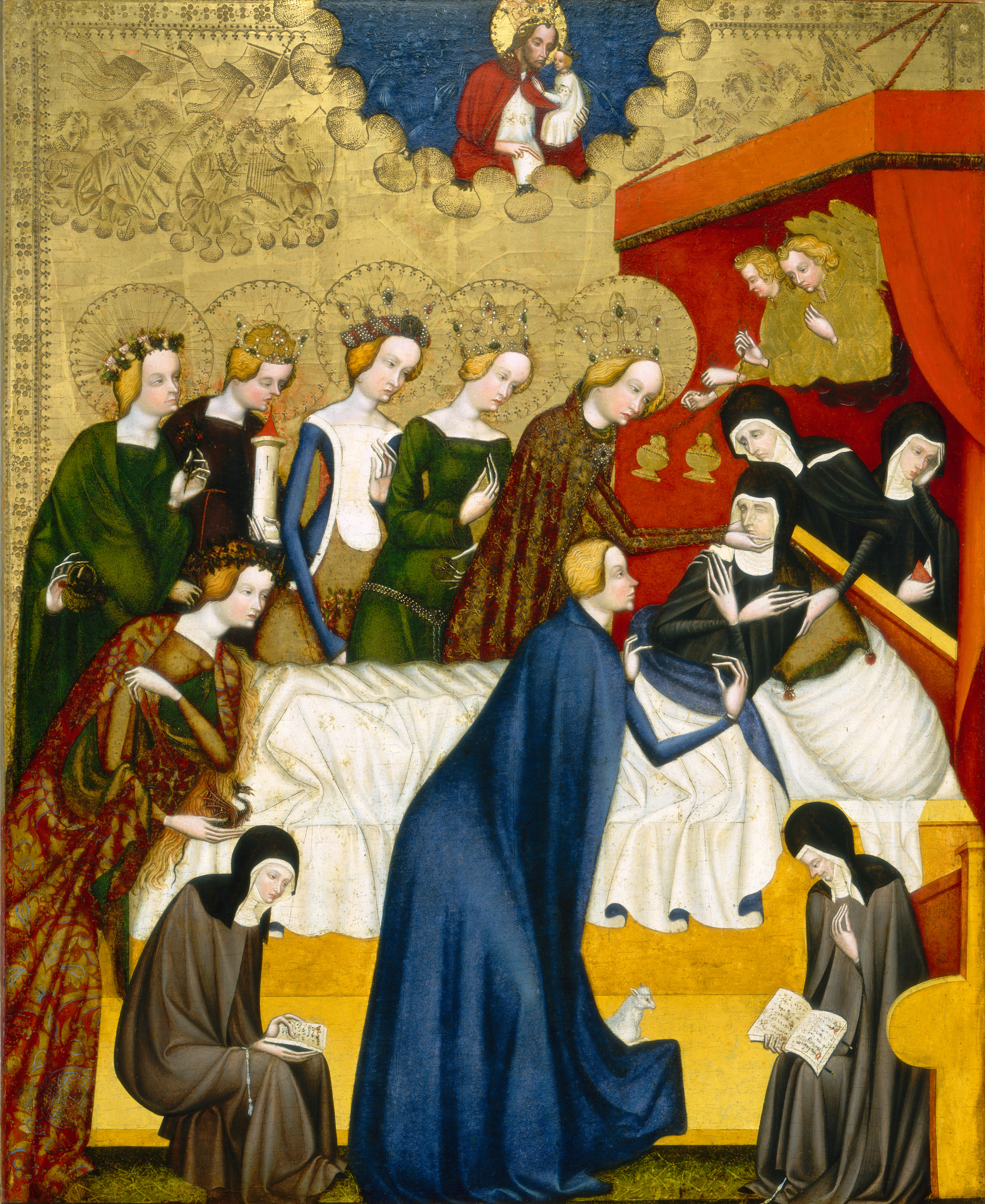
Death of Saint Claire, 15th century, in the National Gallery of Art

The Master of Heiligenkreuz was an Austrian painter active at the beginning of the 15th century; a tentative lifespan of 1395 to 1430 has been put forth but this appears highly conjectural. His name is taken from a diptych that once belonged to the Cistercian Abbey of Heiligenkreuz, located in southeastern Austria near the present-day border with Hungary. The left panel depicts the Annunciation on the obverse; the reverse is a depiction of the Madonna and Child. The right panel depicts the Mystical Marriage of Saint Catherine, with Saint Dorothy on its reverse. Details of costume and iconography combine with associations with the International Style to indicate a date of around the first decade of the 15th century.

It was initially proposed, by Betty Kurth in 1922, that the artist was French and had some association with the court in Paris. Other writers have disagreed, and various nationalities including French, Austrian, German, or Bohemian have been posited for the Master. Some have further suggested that he was an itinerant court artist, trained in France but active in Austria. Various clues have been used in an attempt to describe his nationality. These include his use of finely-worked gold decoration, in which some have seen a link to Franco-Burgundian goldsmith's work of the late 14th century. Others, instead, see it as a link to the school of panel painting then active at the court in Prague. Consequently, it seems highly unlikely that the artist's nationality will be conclusively established.

Stylistically, the Master's work is distinguished by use of some Gothic decorative elements, as well as oddly-proportioned figures with long, thin limbs and fingers.
