= Schuselka =

Schuselka is a surname. Notable people with the surname include:

- Elfriede Schuselka (born 1940), Austrian artist
- Franz Schuselka (1811–1886), Austrian politician and writer
