= Hamerschlag =

Hamerschlag is a surname. Notable people with the surname include:

- Arthur Hamerschlag (1872–1927), American electrical and mechanical engineer and university president
- Margarete Hamerschlag (1902–1958), Austrian artisan, painter, author, and illustrator

== See also ==
- Hammerschlag
