= List of Austrian women photographers =

This is a list of women photographers who were born in Austria or whose works are closely associated with that country.

== C ==
- Claire Beck (1904–1942), Jewish photographer in Vienna, died in the Riga concentration camp

== D ==
- Gerti Deutsch (1908–1979), Austrian-born British photographer, contributed to Picture Post

== F ==
- Marina Faust (active since 1974), artist, photographer
- Trude Fleischmann (1895–1990), society photographer, business in New York from 1940
- Gustl French (1909–2004), Austrian-American printmaker and photographer

== J ==
- Birgit Jürgenssen (1949–2003), photographer, painter, educator, specialized in feminine body art

== K ==
- Dora Kallmus (1881–1963), fashion and portrait photographer
- Hella Katz (1899–1981), Jewish portrait photographer and photography instructor
- Anna Koppitz (1899–1989), artistic photographer
- Friedl Kubelka (born 1946), photographer, filmmaker

== M ==
- Karin Mack (born 1940), photographic artist
- Lotte Meitner-Graf (1899–1973), black and white portraitist
- Margaret Michaelis-Sachs (1902–1985), Austrian-Australian photographer, remembered for portraits, 1930 landscapes of Barcelona and Krakow
- Inge Morath (1923–2002), Austrian-American photographer, worked for Magnum

== P ==
- Lisl Ponger (born 1947), photographer, filmmaker and multidisciplinary artist
- Hanna Putz (born 1987), artistic photographer

== S ==
- Julia Spicker (active since 2009), portrait and fashion photographer
- Margherita Spiluttini (1947–2023), architectural photographer
- Susanne Stemmer (born 1973), visual artist and photographer

== See also ==
- List of women photographers
