= Tatjana Gamerith =

German-Austrian painter and graphic artist (1919–2021)

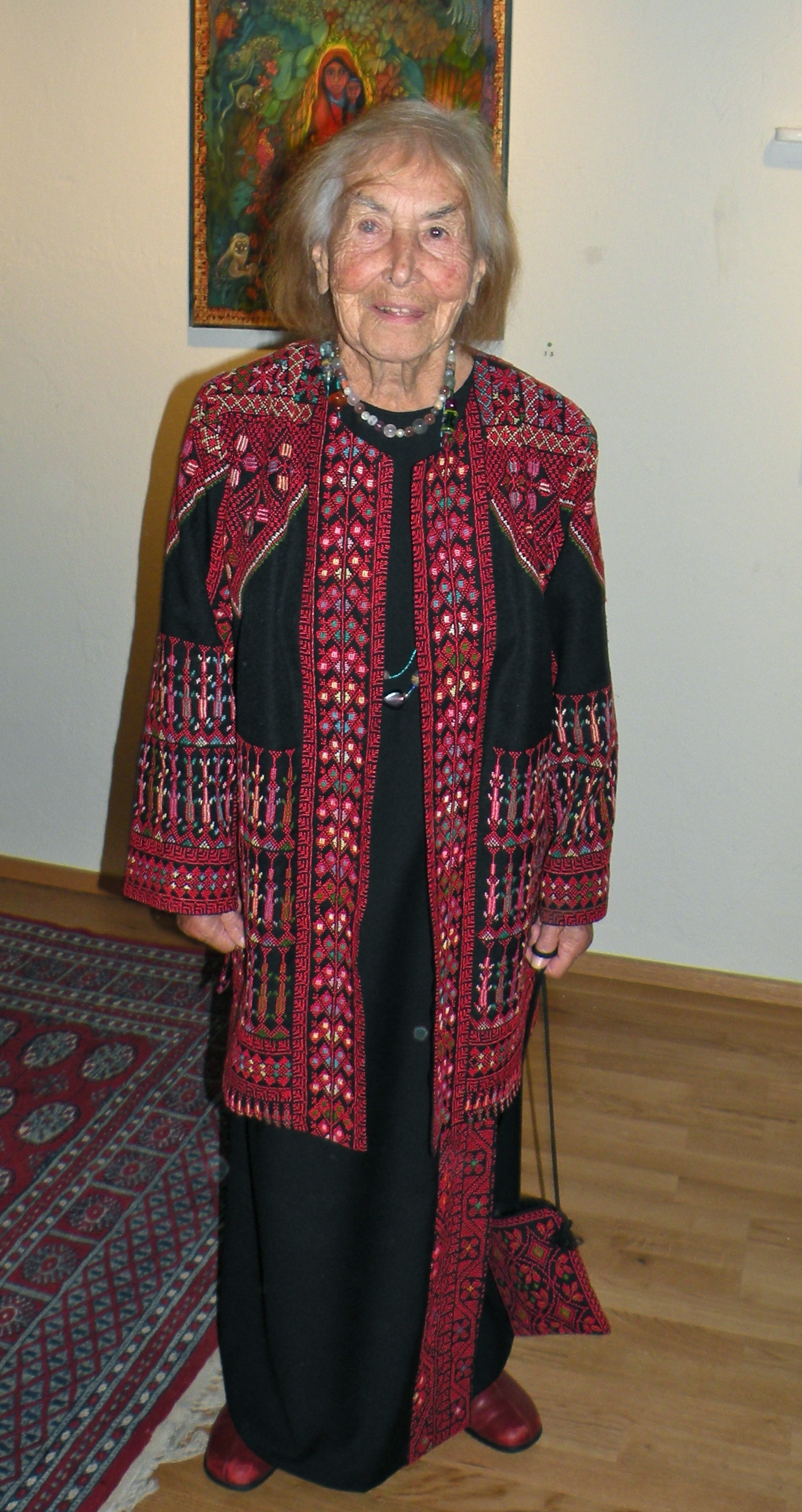
- Gamerith in 2013
- Born: January 4, 1919; Berlin, Germany
- Died: May 3, 2021 (aged 102)
- Education: Höhere Graphische Bundes-Lehr- und Versuchsanstalt
- Style: Painting, graphic arts

Tatjana Gamerith (4 January 1919 – 3 May 2021) was a German-Austrian painter and graphic artist.

== Life ==
Tatjana Gamerith was born on 4 January 1919 in Berlin to Austrian and Baltic German parents. The family moved to Austria in 1943. After graduating from the Höhere Graphische Bundes-Lehr- und Versuchsanstalt in Vienna, Gamerith initially worked at an armaments factory. She subsequently began designing postcards, and worked as a graphic artist at the Schönbrunn Zoo, where she painted signs that described the animals. She met her future husband Werner Gamerith in Vienna. An environmental activist, Werner Gamerith, then 20, told Tatjana that he did not care that she was 20 years older than him. In the 1960s, they moved to Waldhausen, where they lived for decades.

Living amidst the nature of Waldhausen, Gamerith's life was closely related to art. Her earlier works centered on flower compositions, and later, she painted landscapes that included floodplains, tropical forests, and reefs. Commentators have also identified a more powerful and abstract style to some of her final works. Despite the progressive loss of sight later, she continued to paint even at old age. Her works have been exhibited across several exhibitions. For their joint effort to combine art and nature, Gamerith and her husband were honoured with the Konrad-Lorenz-Preis (Konrad Lorenz Prize for Environmental Protection) in 1984.

The film Noema (2014) is about her life, and, in particular about the circumstances of the aging artist losing her eye-sight at the age of 93. Directed by Christiana Perschon, the film received three awards at the 2014 Vienna Independent Shorts film festival. Married for over 60 years, the married life of the Gamerith couple was portrayed in the television film Forever Together in 2020.

Gamerith died on 3 May 2021, at the age of 102.
