= Höhere Graphische Bundes-Lehr- und Versuchsanstalt =

Graphics education institution in Vienna, Austria

Coordinates: 48.2018°N 16.3034°E

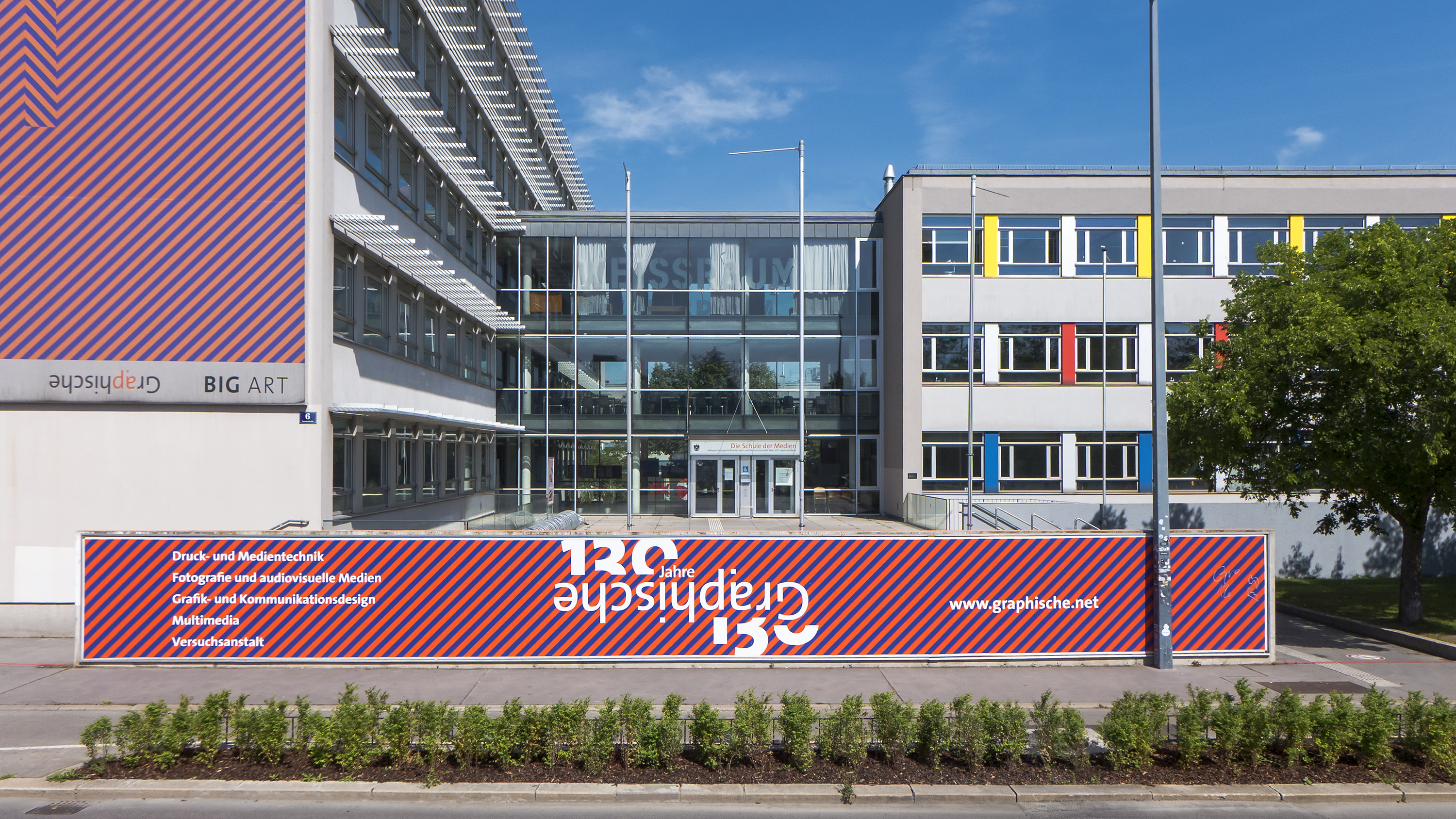
Höhere Graphische Bundes-Lehr- und Versuchsanstalt

The Höhere Graphische Bundes-Lehr- und Versuchsanstalt (HGBLuVA) ("Higher Federal Institution for Graphic Education and Research"), now commonly known as "die Graphische", founded in 1888 in Vienna, is a vocational college for professions in visual communication and media technology in Austria.

== History ==
=== Opening ===
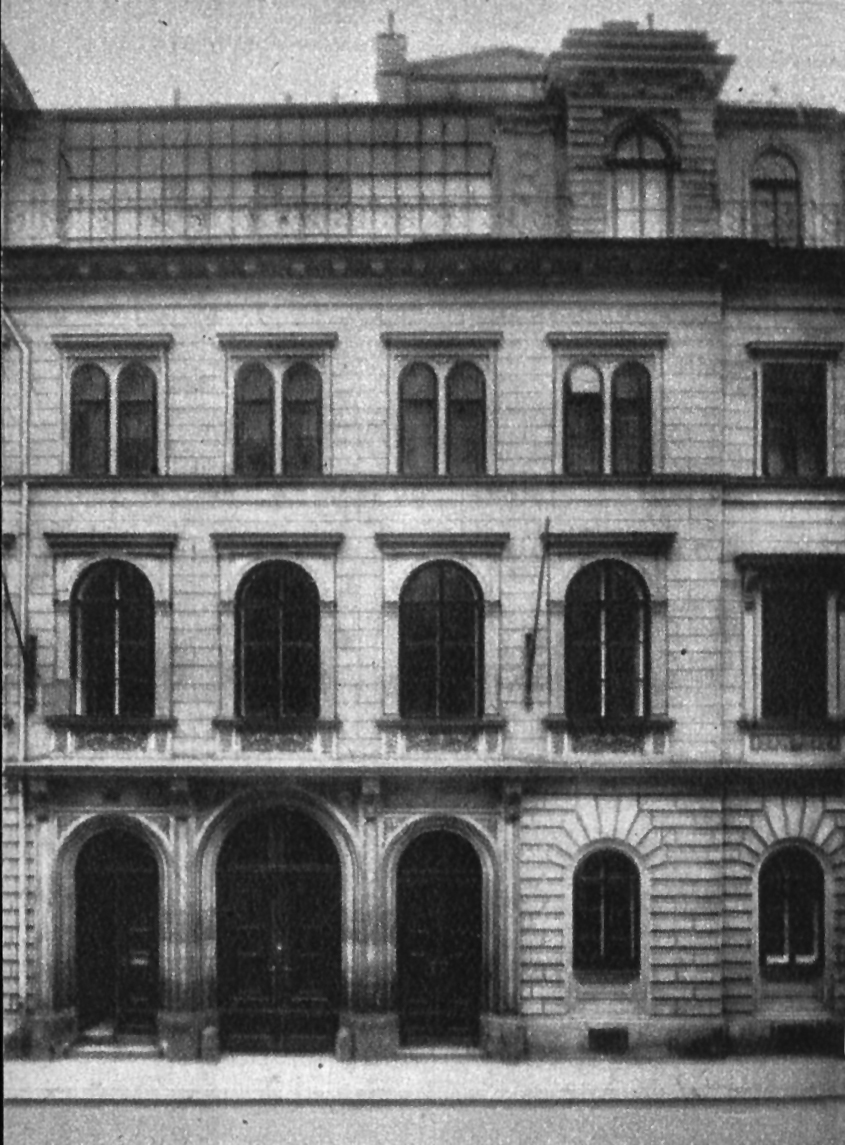
Westbahnstraße 25, Graphische- Lehr- und Versuchsanstalt

Originally set up as a photographic research institute by the President of the Photographic Society, the graphic teaching and research institute (GLV) was created through the incorporation of the photographic school (a department for photographic reproduction processes connected to the Salzburg State Building School) and the Hörwarter general drawing school in Vienna. Since its foundation, it has made an important contribution to the establishment and development of the graphic professions.

According to a resolution of March 14, 1887, the City Council of Vienna made three floors of the municipal building in Vienna VII, Westbahnstraße 25, available to the former Schottenfelder Realschule for the establishment of a teaching and research institute for photography and reproduction processes. The k. k. Lehr- und Versuchsanstalt für Photographie und Reproductionsverfahren, founded and directed (1888–1923) by Josef Maria Eder, previously of the Technologische Gewerbemuseum (Museum of Applied Technology), for which he established a Section for Photography and Reproduction Techniques, and the Vienna State Trade School where, recently qualified as a university lecturer, he began teaching chemistry and physics in 1881.

It opened on March 1, 1888 with 108 students. In the next school year the number of students rose to 174. In 1890, Eder placed a Wothly solar camera (an early means of enlarging negatives) on the roof. In the context of the history of vocational schools and the applied arts, pioneering educational reforms in Austria from the 1870s created institutions like it outside the format of the classical university, it being a special variation on the “state trade school” (“Staats-Gewerbeschule”). Eder based his institution on earlier foreign models such as the Conservatoire des arts et métiers in Paris (founded 1794), that housed a museum of history and technology and hosted with evening lectures and demonstrations, with lectures in photography commencing in 1891.

From 1897 onwards the name Graphische Lehr- und Versuchsanstalt came into being . In 1906, Emperor Franz Joseph granted the school the designation “Imperial and Royal” in the title, and the Republic of Austria confirmed this distinction when the school's Federal Chancellery approved the use of the national coat of arms.

=== The beginnings ===
The GLV was instituted on August 27, 1887 "by the highest resolution to approve the activation of this teaching and research institute in Vienna on March 1, 1888". The aim of the institute was the “training of specialist photographers, retouchers, collotype printers, photolithographers, etc., the instruction of artists, scholars and technicians who want to learn photography as an auxiliary science, furthermore the testing of equipment, chemicals and the implementation of independent scientific investigations in the areas of Photochemistry and Related Subjects”.

The school consisted of two departments; the Institute for Photography and Reproduction Processes and the Research Institute, and in 1891 the Board of Book Printers and Type Founders pointed out the urgent need to add a department for book printers to the school. In 1897 an additional section for the book and illustration trade was opened, the school called "KK Graphische Lehr- und Versuchsanstalt" was then divided into four sections:

- Section I: Institute for Photography and Reproduction (corresponds to the former Institute for Photography and Reproduction Processes)
- Section II: College for the book and illustration trade
- Section III: Research institute for photochemistry and graphic printing processes (corresponds to the original research institute)
- Section IV: Collections: graphic collection, library and equipment collection

The first original lithographs by famous artists such as Luigi Kasimir and Tina Blau are thanks to the special course for lithography and lithography introduced in 1905 and 'algraphy' - a planographic printing process from an aluminum plate instead of the stone used in lithography - was first taught in Austria in 1896 at the GLV. The specialty course for lithography and lithography existed until 1913/14, after which a specialist course for xylography (wood engraving and woodcuts) was offered.

In 1908 the graphic arts department was set up on the top floor of the neighbouring house at Westbahnstraße 27 connected by a spiral staircase still in existence in the courtyard at the current location on Leyserstraße.

=== Women in the graphic teaching and research institute ===
From 1908 women were also officially admitted. For the period from 1888 to 1918/19, a total of 718 female students at the Graphische are recorded in the largely preserved class lists. Due to changes and new requirements in the job description, the proportion of women continued to grow, so that in some classes it exceeded two thirds.

=== The Graphics Department ===
In 1916, the school statute was changed: all-day lessons with photography internship in the 1st and 2nd years as well as training for disabled people were introduced and a drawing school was added.

After the First World War, the school was renamed several times:

In 1919 the name was "Deutsch-Österreichische Graphische Lehr- und Versuchsanstalt"; changed in 1920 to "Staatliche Graphische Lehr- und Versuchsanstalt" and in 1923 to "Graphic Education and Research Institute".

=== The school in the time of National Socialism ===
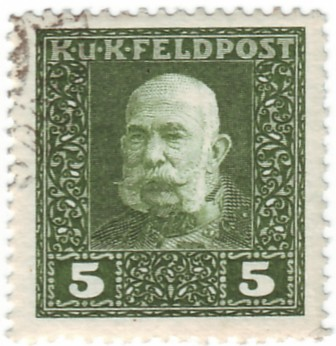
WW1 Austro-Hungarian Military "Feldpost" stamp, 1915, Mi Nr 25, 5 heller, engraved by F. Schirnböck.

The "annexation of Austria by Germany" resulted in organisational restructuring: semesters were introduced and the GLV was made a subordinate level of a university of the graphic arts administered in Leipzig.

In 1939 the school became a state graphic teaching and research institute . Up to this point, two thirds of all Austrian postage stamps had been designed and engraved in the Graphische.

=== Post-war period ===
In 1945 the period of study at the technical school was extended to four years. In 1948, “manual graphics” became “commercial graphics” followed by an honours year. In 1959, a department A was developed: a three-class specialist department for photography with a master class, and a department B: a specialist department for commercial graphics with four classes and an honours year.

Through further school reforms, the university entrance qualification was acquired with the completion of the now five-year course and honours qualification. In 1967, due to a lack of space, the Westbahnstrasse was moved to the new Carl Appel building in Leyserstrasse.

=== The new building, 1963 ===
On May 22, 1963, the foundation stone of the new campus was laid in the 14th district in the Breitenseer Strasse, Leyserstrasse and Spallartgasse area (Kommandogebäude Theodor Körner). In 1967 the move to the new building began and in 1968 the official opening coincided with the 80th anniversary of the school.

In 1963/64 the first year of the five-year high school for reprography and printing technology began. There was also a four-year technical school.

With the advent of personal computers and their use in the graphics industry, change comes first in typesetting and later in image processing, and in 1984 the advent of desktop publishing brought a revolution that permanently challenged the distinction between photographer, typesetter, layout artist and printer.

In 1988, the Graphische celebrated its 100th anniversary. The rapid development of technology shaped school events in the 1980s, as did the rapid advance of offset printing - albeit at the expense of Letterpress printing. In reproduction technology, scanner technology for the production of colour separations displaced reprography.

=== Renovation, 2006 ===
Due to renovation work on the building in Leyserstraße, the management and the photography, multimedia and graphics departments moved to an alternative location in Vienna's first district at Schellinggasse 13. After the work was completed, the school was relocated in February 2008.

== Notable teachers and students ==
- Wolfgang Ambros
- Maria Austria
- Emma Bormann
- Hans von Borsody
- Gerti Deutsch
- Josef Maria Eder
- Karin Frank
- Tatjana Gamerith
- Birgit Guðjónsdóttir
- Heidi Harsieber
- Ernst Haas
- Carry Hauser
- Gottfried Helnwein
- Robert Herzl
- Dora Kallmus
- Henry Koerner
- Anna Koppitz
- Rudolf Koppitz
- Felicitas Kuhn
- Hans Larwin
- Ludwig Michalek
- Josef Mikl
- Michaela Moscouw
- Hermann Nitsch
- Franz Poledne
- Erwin Puchinger
- Willy Puchner
- Florian Pumhösl
- Stefan Sagmeister
- Philipp Wilhelm von Schoeller
- Elfriede Schuselka
- Rudolf Schwarzkogler
- Jutta Sika
- Julia Spicker
- Wolf Suschitzky
- Anton Velim
- Christian Wachter
- Trude Waehner
