= Hammerschlag =

Hammerschlag is a surname. Notable people with the surname include:

- Alice Berger Hammerschlag (1917–1969), Austrian artist
- Frank Hammerschlag (born 1960), German footballer
- Peter Hammerschlag (1902–1942), Austrian writer and poet

== See also ==
- Hamerschlag
