= Gertrud Höchsmann =

Gertrud Hochsmann (September 30, 1902 – January 16, 1990) was a Viennese fashion designer. She graduated from the Wiener Kunstgewerbeschule where she studied under Josef Hoffman and Oswald Haerdtl. From 1927 to 1967, she ran a fashion salon on Mariahilfer Strausse where movie stars like Najda Tiller and Grace Kelly would shop. She became the head of the fashion class of the Vienna Academy of Applied Arts in 1959 and worked there until retiring in 1972. She was considered the avant-garde of Viennese haute couture. In 1947, she received the prize of the city of Vienna for the fine arts in the Applied Arts category. In 2002, on the occasion of her 100th birthday, the Museum der Stadt Wien and the Angewandte im Heiligenkreuzerhof dedicated a memorial exhibit.
