= Trude Waehner =

Austrian artist

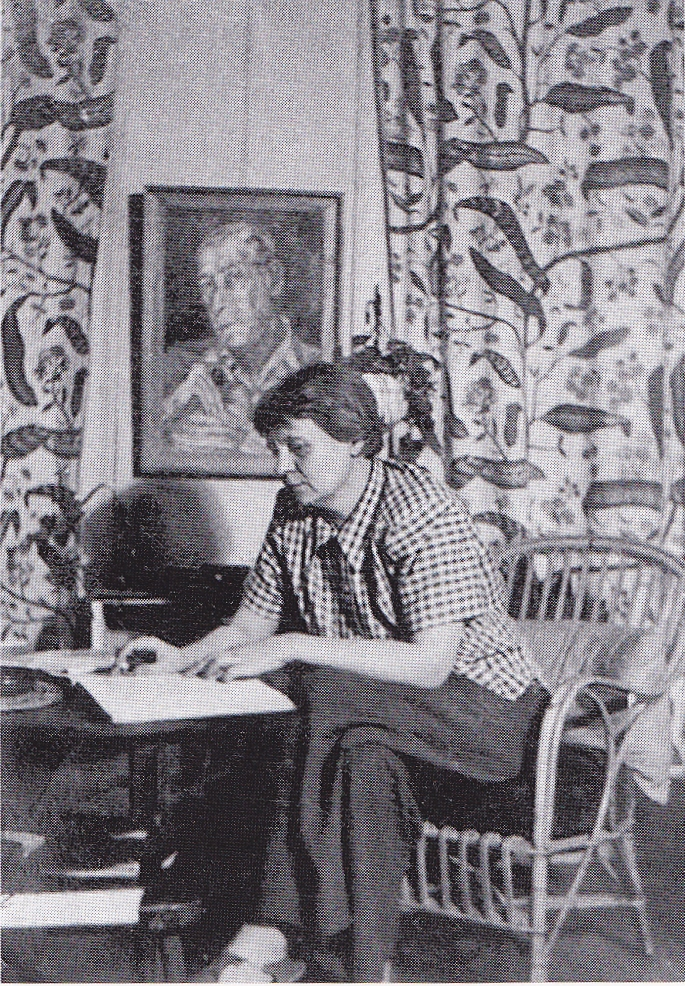
- Born: 11 August 1900; Vienna, Austria
- Died: 18 May 1979 (aged 78); Vienna, Austria
- Known for: Painting
- Website: trude-waehner.at

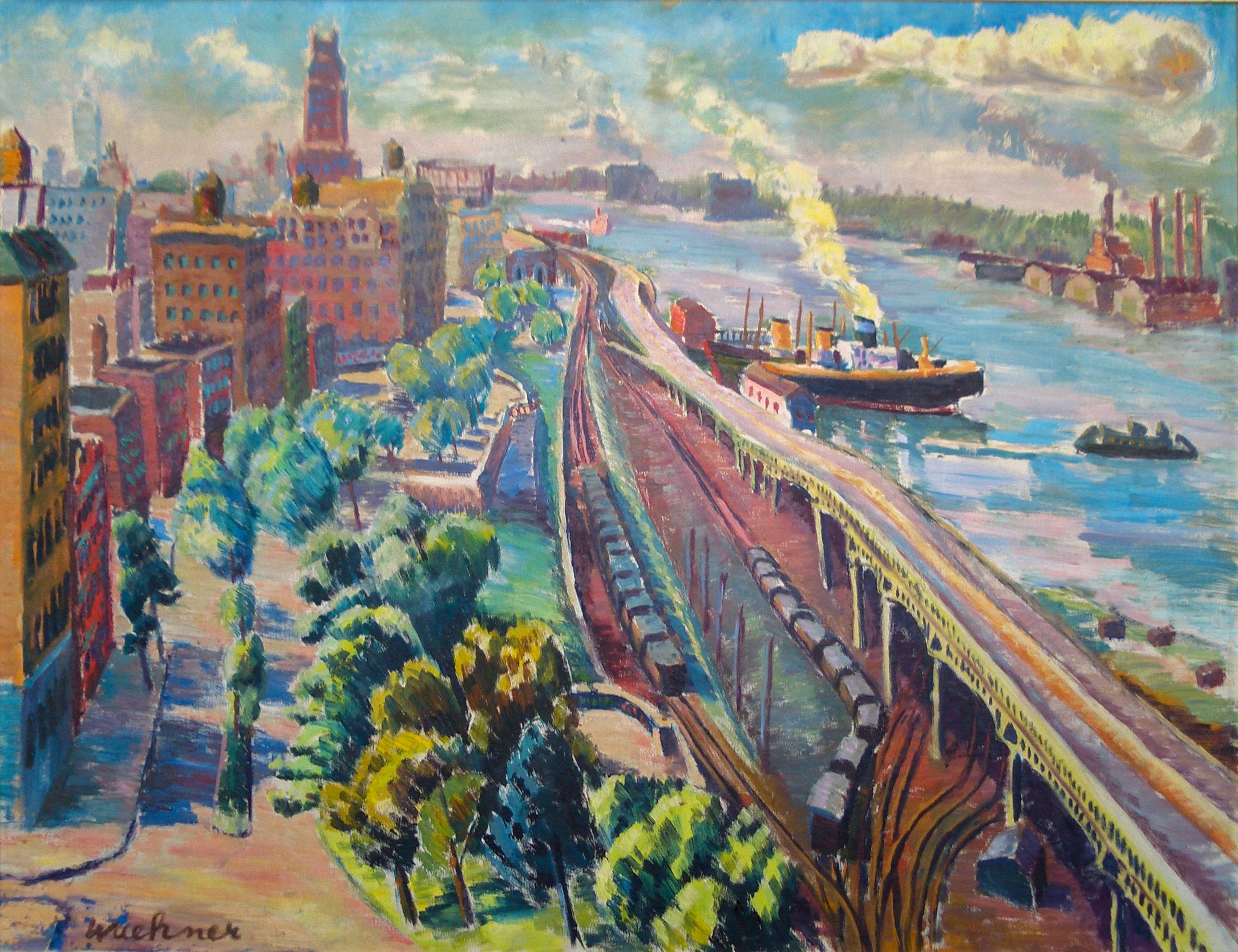
Riverside Drive circa 1940s

Trude Waehner (1900–1979) was an Austrian painter.

== Biography ==
Waehner was born on 11 August 1900 in Vienna, Austria. She studied at Höhere Graphische Bundes-Lehr- und Versuchsanstalt (Higher Graphic Federal Teaching and Research Institute), and the University of Applied Arts Vienna. In 1928 she went on to study at the Bauhaus in Dessau, Germany where her teachers included Paul Klee. In 1938 she emigrated to United States, eventually receiving her American citizenship. While in the United States she taught at Sarah Lawrence College and in 1946 published the paper "Interpretation of spontaneous drawings and paintings". She returned to Europe after World War II where she lived in France and Italy.

Waehner died 18 May 1979 in Vienna.

Waehner's work is in the collections of the Albertina, the Vienna Museum, the Österreichische Galerie Belvedere, the Musée d'Art Moderne de Paris, and the Museo d'Arte Moderna di Bologna.
