= Mathilde Flögl =

Austrian artist and designer (1893–1958)

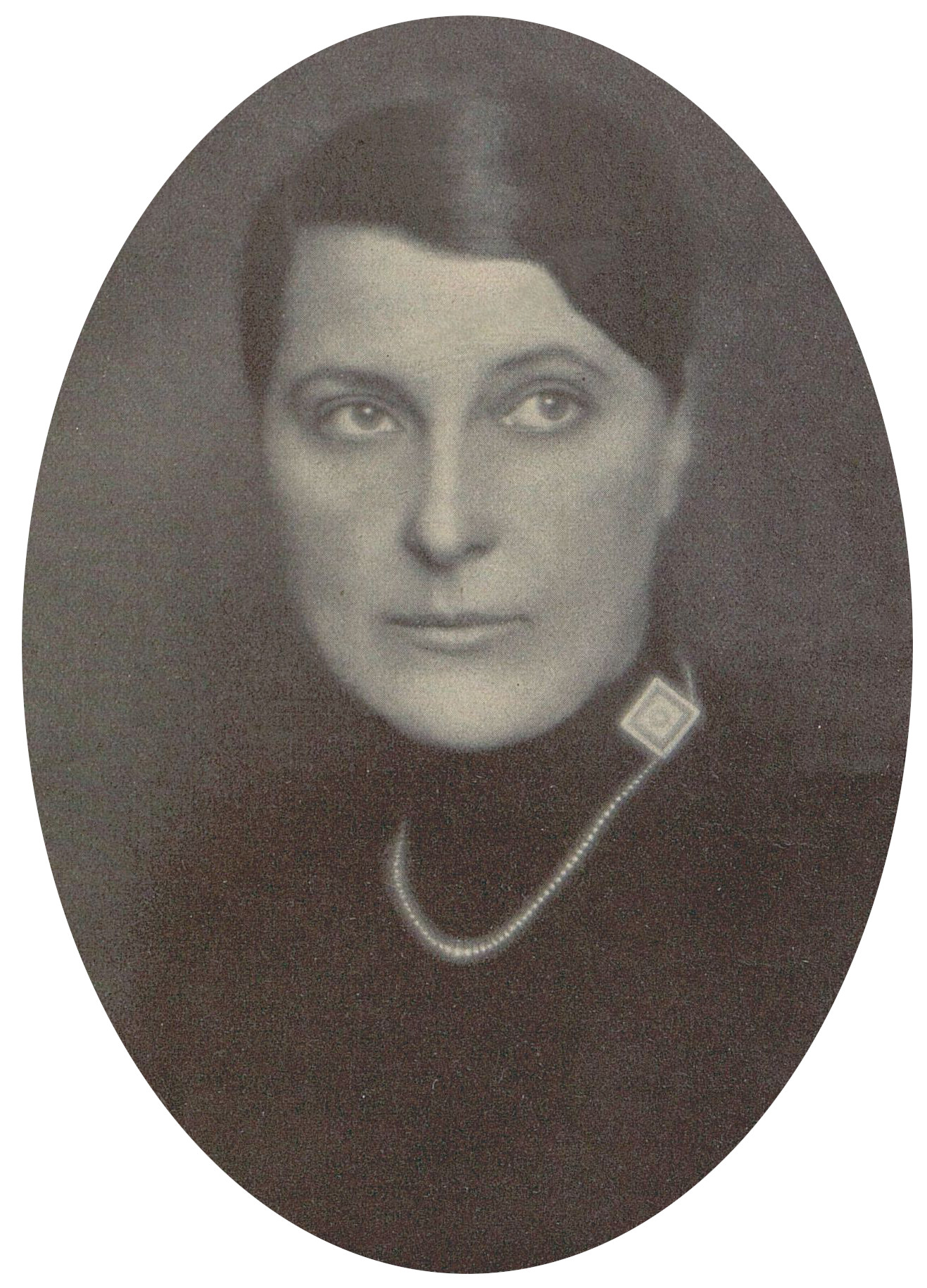
- Born: 9 September 1893; Brno, Czech Republic
- Died: 1958 (aged 64–65); Salzburg Austria
- Occupations: Artist, designer

Mathilde Flögl (9 September 1893 - 1958) was an Austrian artist and designer. She worked in several different mediums including textiles, glass, and paint. Flögl was also a member of the Wiener Werkstätte, literally translated to the Vienna Workshops. This group was part of the Arts and Crafts movement dedicated to elegance, utility, and appropriateness. They aimed to refine art and expand it to all fields of life. Flögl was very active in this group, she participated in most of the major Wiener Werkstätte exhibitions. Currently, the Viennese Museum of Applied Arts houses over 1,600 of Flögl's works from when she was involved with the Wiener Werkstätte. Among these are many independent works and collaborations with other individuals in the group. Notable members of the Wiener Werkstätte include two of its founders Josef Hoffman and Koloman Moser as well as Gustav Klimt, among others. For the group's 25th anniversary, Flögl amassed, arranged, wrote, and published, The Wiener Werkstatte, 1903-1928: The Evolution of the Modern Applied Arts. The book itself was a work of art using elaborate materials and decoration in its pages.

The group's finances were always precarious because of their use of these costly materials but in 1929 the Wiener Werkstätte disbanded due to bankruptcy with the stock market crash that same year. In 1931, Flögl began a studio of her own which she operated for four years. Flögl was also a member of the Wiener Frauenkunst (Viennese Women's Art), a group of female artists working in Vienna.

Flögl's work is currently in museums around the world including the Smithsonian Institution in Washington DC, The Kyoto Costume Institute in Kyoto, and the Museum of Applied Arts in Vienna, among others.

== Life and schooling ==
Mathilde Flögl was born on 9 September 1893 in Brno, Czech Republic. Between 1909 and 1916, she studied at the Kunstgewerbeschule (School of the Applied Arts) in Vienna. During her education, Flögl focused on applied graphics and enamelling taught by Josef Hoffman and Oskar Strnad among others. Flögl died in 1958 in Salzburg, Austria.

== Flögl and the Wiener Werkstätte ==
Flögl joined the Wiener Werkstätte (Vienna Workshop) in 1916, an artist collective focusing on refinement of material and integrating art into all aspects of life. Their pieces were made both independently and on commission. The collective was formally registered as “Wiener Werkstätte, Productivgenossenschaft von Kunsthandwerkern in Wien, Genossenschaft mit unbeschränkter Haftung” (Vienna Workshops manufacturing co-operative of artist craftsmen in Vienna, co-operative with unlimited liability) in 1903 by Josef Hoffman, Koloman Moser, and Fritz Waerndorfer.

The workshop had conflicting views on its integration of women artists. It was known to many as a space for women to produce art without the burden of the male gaze. The majority of women in the collective were paid as much as their male counterparts. Yet, a critic describes the Wiener Werkstaette workshop in Döblergasse:

When one entered the ateliers in the Döblergasse, one saw little of the men directing the whole thing… but the young women-artists in their white smocks zipped through the whole building, populating all of its stories. If one searched for them in the workplaces, one found them either at the drawing table with a textile-design sketch, or occupied with embroidery or a poster, or else busy as ceramicist at the pottery wheel.

— Hans Ankwicz-Kleehoven

Flögl joined the workshop in its second iteration when the original Wiener Werkstäette liquidated in 1914 due to difficulty in selling their work and thus a lack of funding. The renewed Wiener Werkstaette, now called “Betriebsgesellschaft m.b.H. der Wiener Werksatte Productivegenossenschaft für Gegenstände des Kunstgewerbes” (Vienna workshops manufacturing cooperative for handicraft objects Ltd.) was under the direction of Philipp Hauser, Hoffman's colleague, and supported by the Primavesi family who owned 33% of the company's shares. The collective worked in furniture, glass, ceramics, silver and metalwork, jewellery, fashion, graphic design, among other mediums. They opened shops in Switzerland and the USA.

Flögl designed and produced works of art in many different mediums, some in collaboration with other members of the Wiener Werkstaette like Hoffman. For example, on a glass, Flögl painted the designs on the sides of a cup Hoffman constructed. Similarly, with a glass box, Flögl added the floral designs while Hoffman manufactured the box. Flögl also painted murals for residences and establishments in Vienna including the Graben-Café. She worked in fashion, notably designing the fabric for a gown at the held at the Kyoto Costume Institute, in addition to accessories such as beaded necklaces. She also did many ceramic pieces including a ceramic candelabra (c. 1925) and a ceramic hunting scene featuring dogs attacking a deer (1917). Designs for textiles, glassware, and metalwork seems to be where most of her work lies.

Flögl used floral designs in her work in addition to more geometric patterns making pieces that were both abstract and linear. An example of this style is seen in a swatch called Fälter (butterfly), chosen for the bedspread of Karl Duldig and Slawa Horowitz-Duldig in 1924. It was block printed onto silk. This use of an artist's work as a bedspread also exemplified the Wiener Werkstätte's belief in art being incorporated into all areas of life. Flögl used abstract shapes and geometric lines, as was characteristic of her work, to produce columns of bright butterflies separated by colourful vertical lines. Flögl was partial to butterflies. In 1929, Swiss-German company, Salubra manufactured a wallpaper collection designed by Flögl. Copper Hewitt has an online collection featuring 59 pieces of her painted design work, most painted in gouache.

For the group's 25th anniversary, Flögl edited, arranged, wrote, and published, The Wiener Werkstätte, 1903-1928: The Evolution of the Modern Applied Arts Exhibitions. It was published in English, French, and German. The book includes essays on the group's notable figures, members’ monograms, and illustrations of the members’ work over the 25-year period. The text was received with mixed reviews; Some criticised the text's lack of typographical process and Max Ermers, associated with Adolf Loos (a notable architect of the time), asserted that the text showed the “spirit of the very spirit of the WW, culture of the terminal culture proper to the Decline of the West.”

=== Exhibitions ===
While Flögl was a part of the collective, the Wiener Werkstätte was involved with many exhibitions. One of the earlier exhibitions featuring Flögl included the 1917 “Stockholm Austrian Art Exhibition,” where 240 pieces were contributed by the Wiener Werkstätte. The exhibition was designed to display's Austria's creativity during WWI, a creativity that would continue into times of peace too. In 1925, the Exposition Internationale des Arts Décoratifs et industriels Modernes was held In Paris. This exhibition was designed to display modern forms of aesthetics, anything that reproduced previous styles was rejected from the exhibition. 1930 was the year of the Werkbund exhibition in Paris. The exhibition featured the French decorative style and the more standardized German style.

== A Workshop of Her Own ==
Between 1931 and 1935 Flögl operated her own workshop, centred around fashion and interior design

== The Wiener Frauenkunst ==
Flögl was reported to have been a part of the Wiener Frauenkunst (literally translated to Viennese Women's Art) which emerged from the “Vereinigung bildender Künstlerinnen Österreichs” (Association of Fine Artists of Austria) (VBKÖ) in 1926. The group proved to be much more radical than the VBKÖ. It aimed to encourage women's artwork, taking attention away from and destabilizing male art organizations, announcing liberation from the patriarchal art world. They investigated gender through a feminist lens. The Wiener Frauenkunst held many exhibitions in Vienna. The group closed in 1956 shortly after the founder, Fanny Harlfinger, died as no new members joined and the old ones seemed inactive.

== See also ==
- Wiener Werkstaette
- Arts and Crafts Movement
- Vienna Secession
