= Gabriele Maria Deininger-Arnhard =

German-Austrian painter

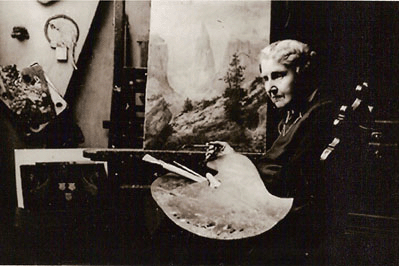
- Born: July 31, 1855; Munich, Kingdom of Bavaria
- Died: October 19, 1945 (aged 90)
- Education: Royal School of Art

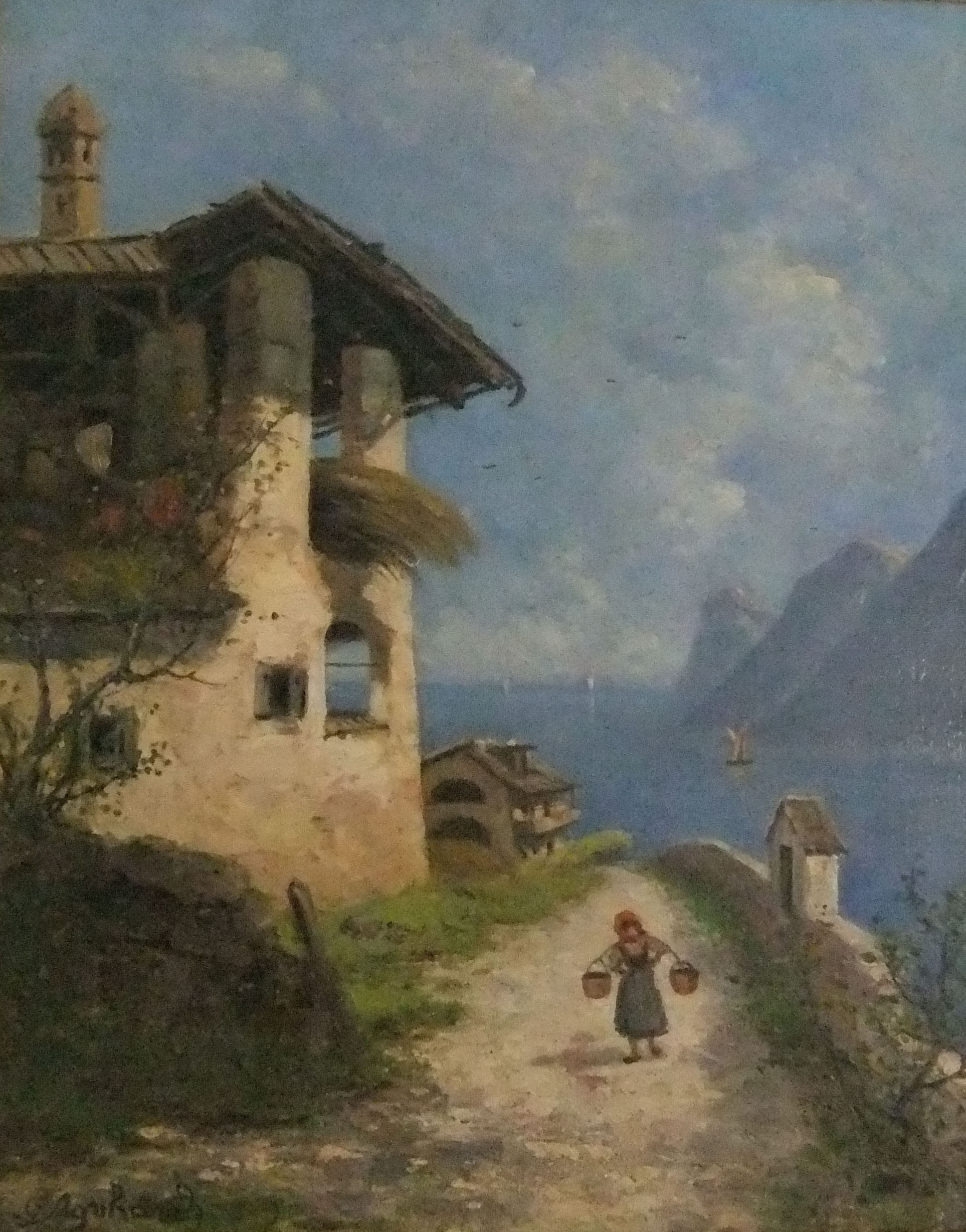
Water Carrier by Lake Garda

Gabriele Maria Deininger-Arnhard (31 July 1855 – 19 October 1945) was a German-Austrian painter.

== Life ==
She was born in Munich. Her parents were Wilhelm Arnhard, a magazine editor in Munich, and Anna Lenck from Augsburg.

She studied at the Royal School of Art in Munich. Afterwards, she attended classes with Julius Lange, and Franz Streitt. From 1880 to 1885, she worked as a landscape painter in Munich.

In 1885, she married the architect, Johann Wunibald Deininger and moved to Innsbruck. They were based in Innsbruck-Wilten, Franz Fischerstrasse 9. The artist also devoted herself to landscape painting in Innsbruck. She often assisted her husband in topographic-art-historical studies in the whole of Tyrol.

== Reception ==
Deininger-Arnhard painted mostly landscapes from the Tyrolean and Bavarian regions, but also depicted rural interiors, in oil and watercolor. She was best known for her depictions of the Ötztal. According to her own account, she painted more than 1,000 large-format oil paintings. These may be found in collections in various cities in Germany, Tyrol, Vienna, Paris, Holland, Switzerland, the Czech Republic, Hungary and North America.

Deininger-Arnhard's first solo exhibition as an artist was at the Tiroler Landesmuseum (Ferdinandeum). Other exhibitions followed at home and abroad. A series of her Tyrolean landscape paintings was published as color postcards by the lithographic firm K. Redlich.

From 1906, Deininger-Arnhard led a painting school for women in Innsbruck, which first saw success in 1907.

She died in 1945 in Rum, Tyrol.
