= Moje Menhardt =

Austrian painter

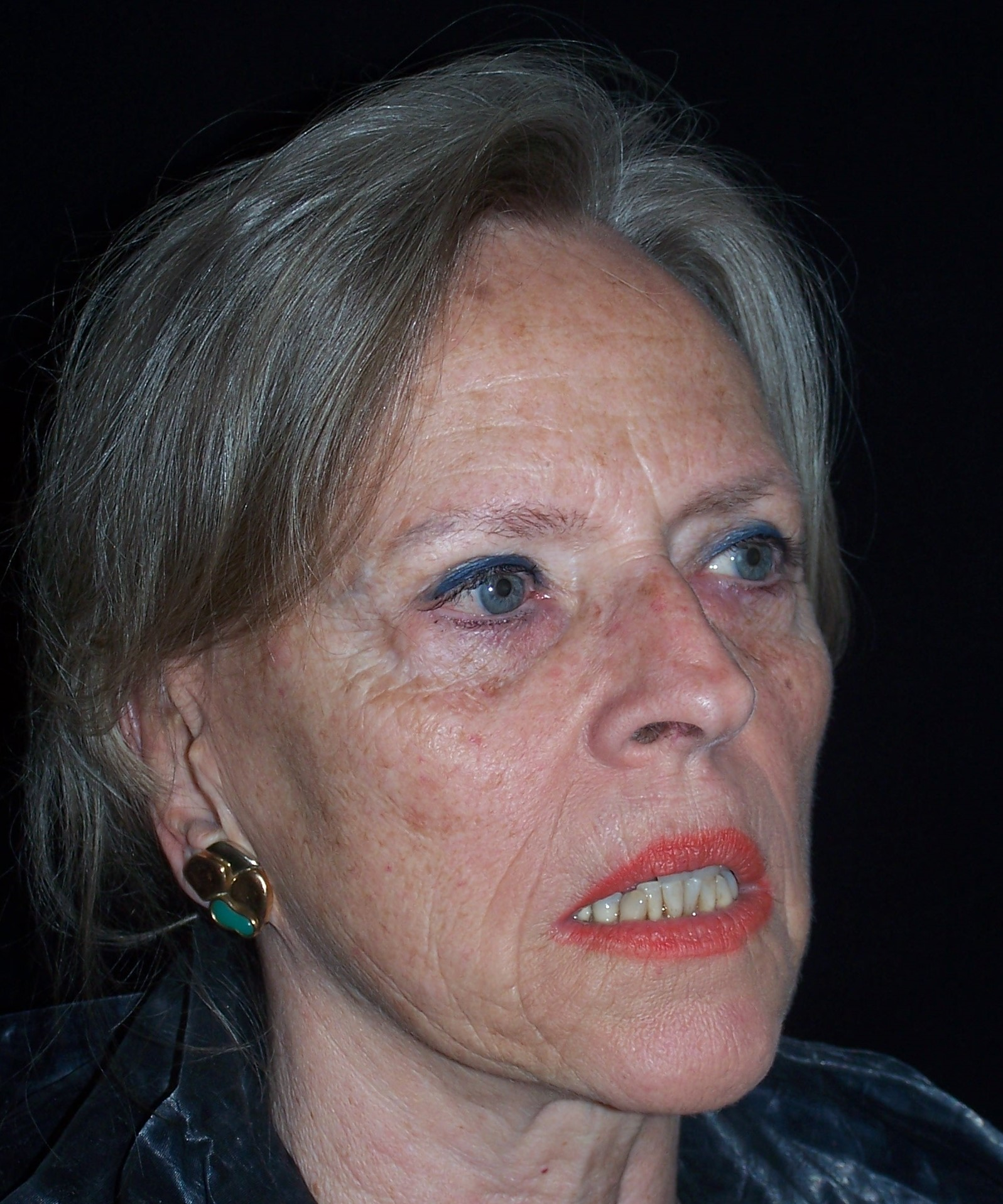
- Born: 20 June 1934; Hamburg, Germany
- Education: Akademie voor Kunst en Vormgeving St. Joost; Academy of Fine Arts Vienna
- Website: www.menhardt.com/Moje

Moje Menhardt (born 20 June 1934) is an Austrian painter.

== Life and career ==
Moje Menhardt lives and works in Weitenegg and Vienna, Austria. She previously lived in Buenos Aires, Rio de Janeiro, Munich, Hamburg, Cologne and Eindhoven. After finishing college, she studied law in Vienna and later painting at the Akademie voor Kunst en Vormgeving St. Joost in 's-Hertogenbosch, Netherlands. She completed her studies at the Academy of Fine Arts Vienna. Meisterschule für Malerei Professor Walter Eckert, 1980 with a diploma.

== Exhibitions (choice) ==
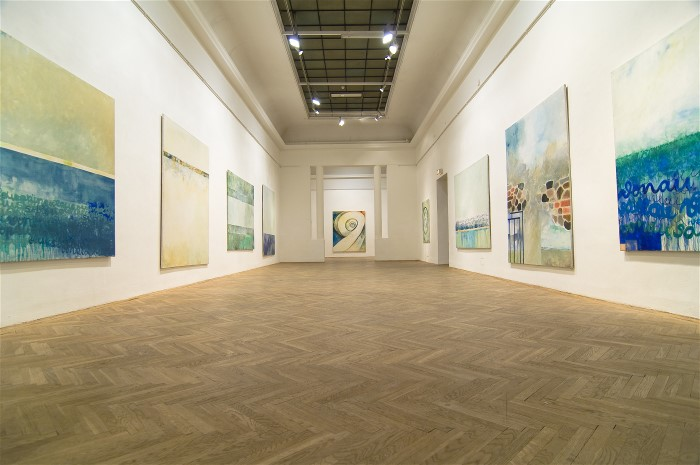
Danube paintings

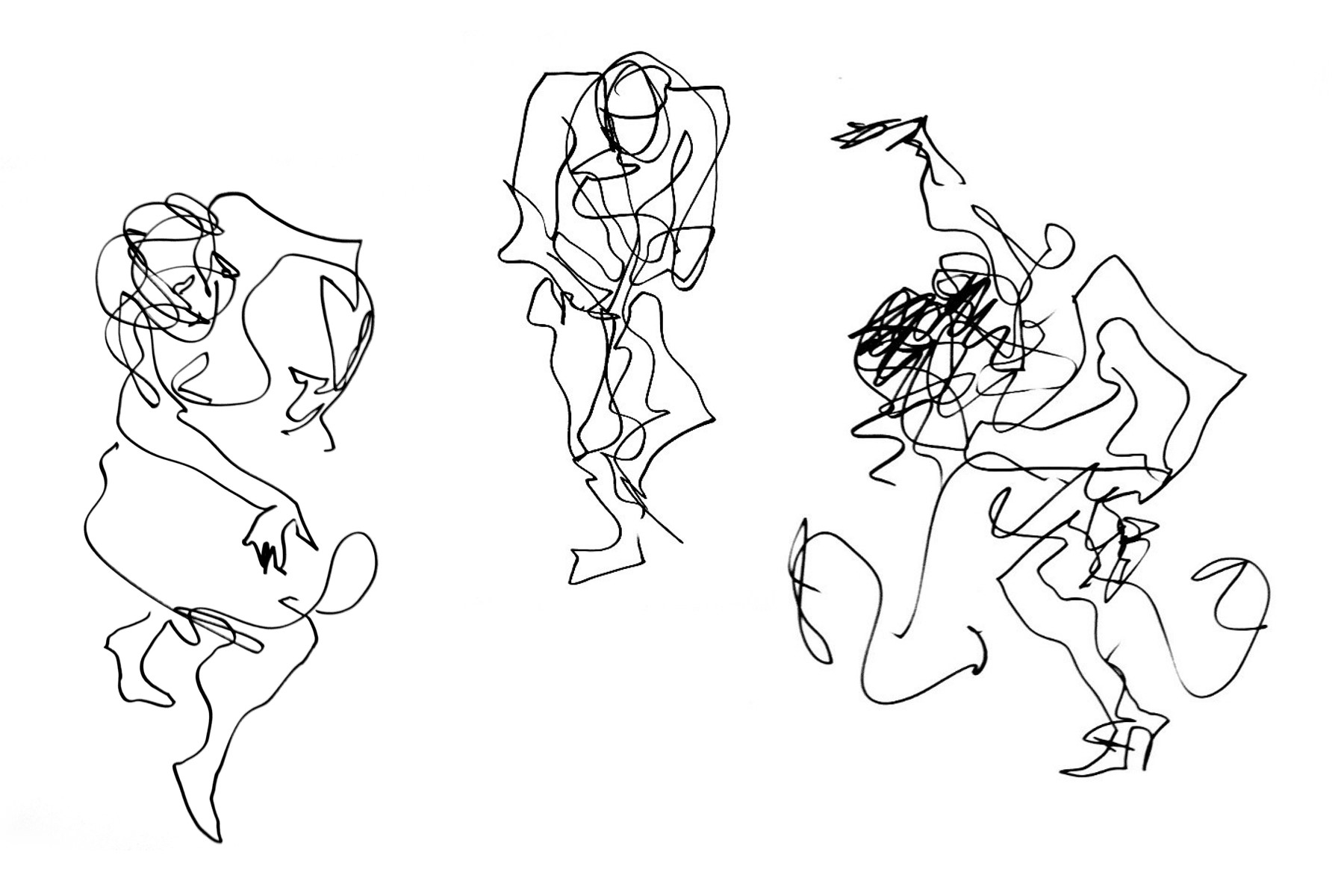
Drawings, ink on paper

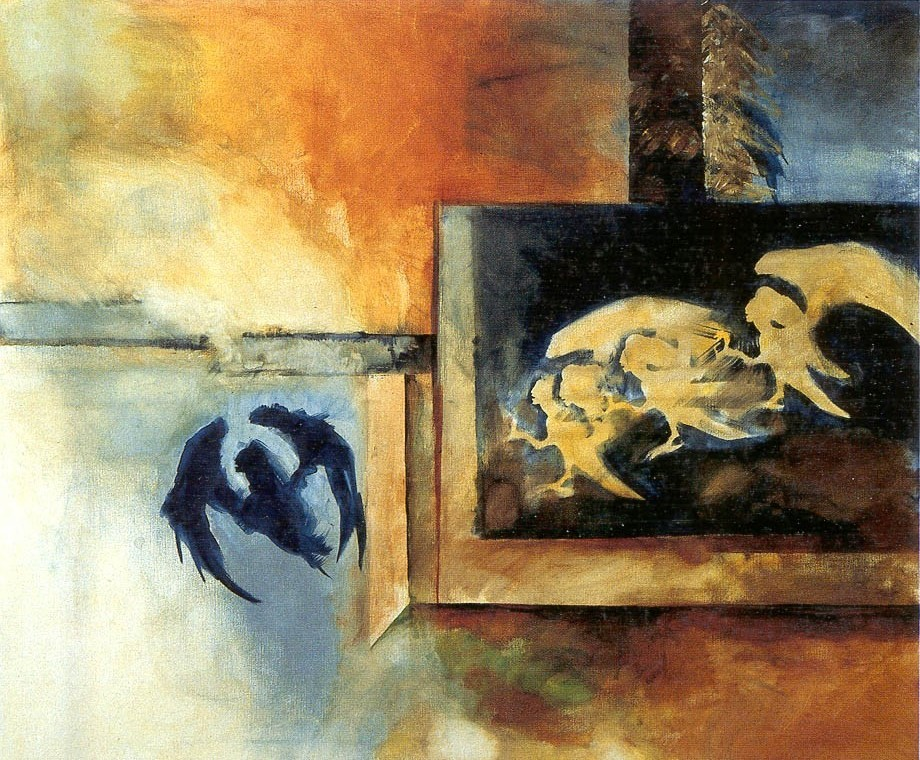
Harpies, Cycle Imaginary Beings, inspired by Jorge Luis Borges

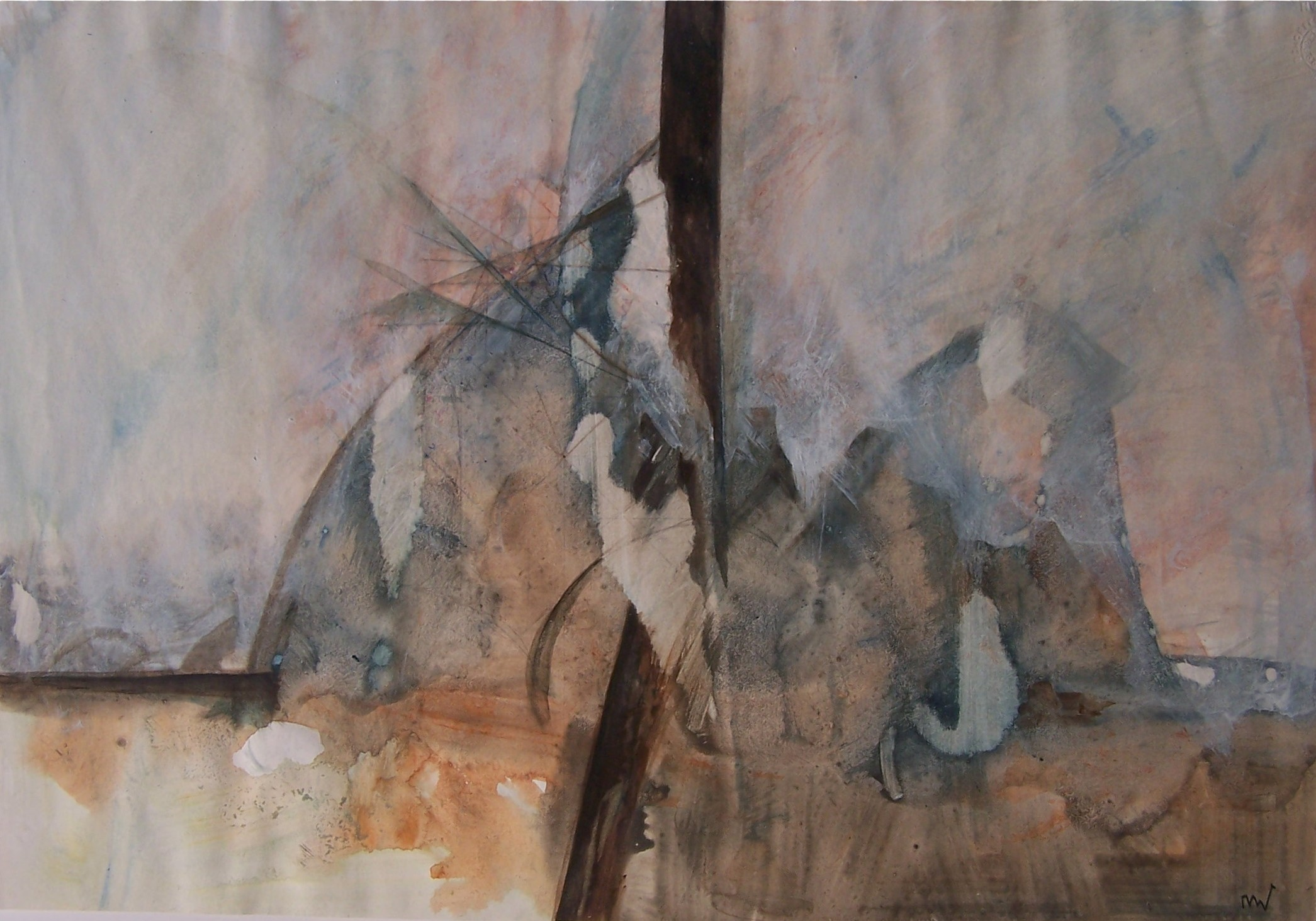
Untitled

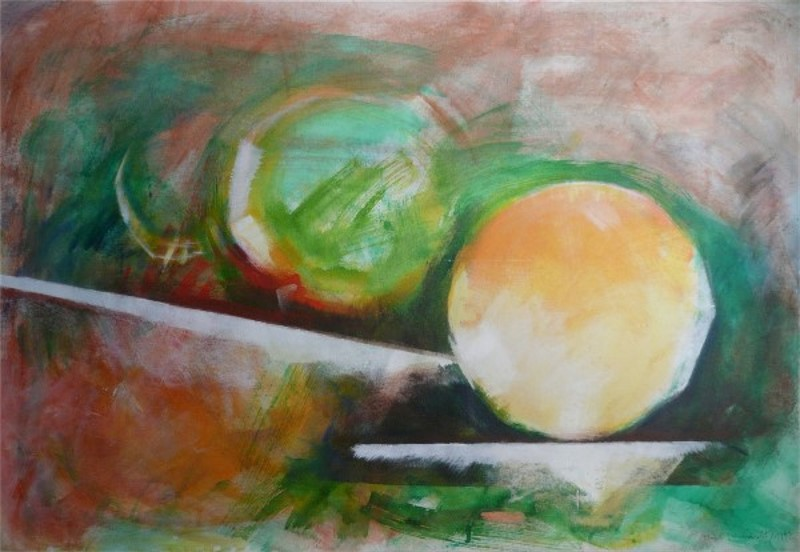
Bydlo, Cycle Pictures at an exhibition, inspired by Modest Mussorgsky

Solo exhibition

- 1990: Drawings, Austrian Cultural Institute, New York
- 1995: Drawings, Cairo Berlin Art Gallery, Cairo
- 1996: Seven wonders of the ancient world, NÖ Landesmuseum, Vienna
- 1996: Museu Nacional de Belas Artes, Rio de Janeiro
- 1999: Danube paintings, Museum Moderner Kunst – Stiftung Wörlen, Passau
- 2001: Danube paintings, Dominikanerkirche Krems, Lower Austria
- 2001/3: Imaginary beings (Jorge Luis Borges), Quito, Bogotá, Medellin, Ibague and Caracas
- 2002: Bilder und zeichnungen, Ägyptisches Kulturinstitut, Vienna
- 2004: Danube – Imaginary Beings – Paintings without title, Art Museum Los Gatos, California
- 2008: Impuls & Tanz, Gotischer Kasten Gern, Eggenfelden
- 2008: Sieben weltwunder per anitke, Foyer Kubinsaal, Schärding
- 2009: Bilder ohne wrote, Seven rooms, Künstlerhaus Wien
- 2010: Danube paintings – Donauklangraum by Rupert Huber, Vienna
- 2010: Wegee und were, Marienkron
- 2010: Vierzehn arten den regen darzustellen, Kabelwerk Art_space Kabelwerk Wien-Meidling
- 2011: Donaubilder, Austrian Cultural Forum Budapest – Danube Culture Boat A38
- 2011: Wasser / Wege / Wilder, Museum Roiten, Lower Austria
- 2012: Migrations, Kabelwerk Art_space Kabelwerk Wien-Meidling, Vienna
- 2013: In bewegung, Kultur Forum Amthof, Feldkirchen
- 2013: Popper Sketches, Sir Karl Popper School, Vienna
- 2014: Drawings: Ways – Flight – Encounter (Wege – Flucht – Begegnung), Tainach/Tinje
- 2015: Pictures at an exhibition, Kultur.Herbst.Neubau, Vienna
- 2016: Pictures and drawings, Europaschloss Leiben

== Corporate collectors ==
Menhardt's work is in the following collections:

=== Austria ===
Austrian Government, Vienna; Austrian Industries, Vienna; Donauversicherung Wien; Kapsch AG Vienna; Krems; NÖ Dokumentationszentrum für Moderne Kunst, Sankt Pölten; NÖ Landesregierung St. Pölten; Oesterreichische Nationalbank

=== Czech Republic, Germany and Switzerland ===
Klinik Hirslanden, Zürich; Museum Moderner Kunst Passau; Passauer Neue Presse; Sdružení Výtvarných Umečlců Jihovýchodní Moravy, Czech Republic

=== Americas ===
Banco de Bilbao, Miami; Barclay's Bank, Miami; Nicolaus SA, São Paulo;

== Literature ==
- Moje Menhardt, Miami M, Arte Victoria Ryan Lobo 1994.
- Aperto – Wien. Der Wegweiser, Katalog, Wien 1995.
- Moje Menhardt, Ausstellungskatalog, Passau 1999.
- Dagmar Travner: Venire. Andare. Sieben europäische Künstler "Kommen und Gehen" auf der niederösterreichischen Burgruine Weitenegg im Donautal, Text und Kunstkritik zur Ausstellung, 2002
- Clouds up high. fleeting figures in the sky Springer Wien New York ISBN 978-3-211-89113-1
