= Frida Konstantin =

Austrian artist

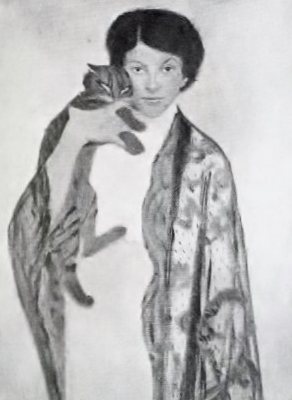
- self portrait
- Born: Frida Lohwag; 10 May 1884; Vienna, Austria
- Died: 29 December 1918 (aged 34); Budapest, Hungry

Frida Konstantin (1884–1918) was an Austrian-Hungarian artist.

== Biography ==
Konstantin née Lohwag was born on 10 May 1884 in Vienna, Austria. She was a co-founder of the Hungarian artists' association Kéve and was included in the group's exhibitions. She died in Budapest on 29 December 1918.

== Legacy ==
Her work was included in the 2019 exhibition City Of Women: Female artists in Vienna from 1900 to 1938 at the Österreichische Galerie Belvedere.

== Gallery ==
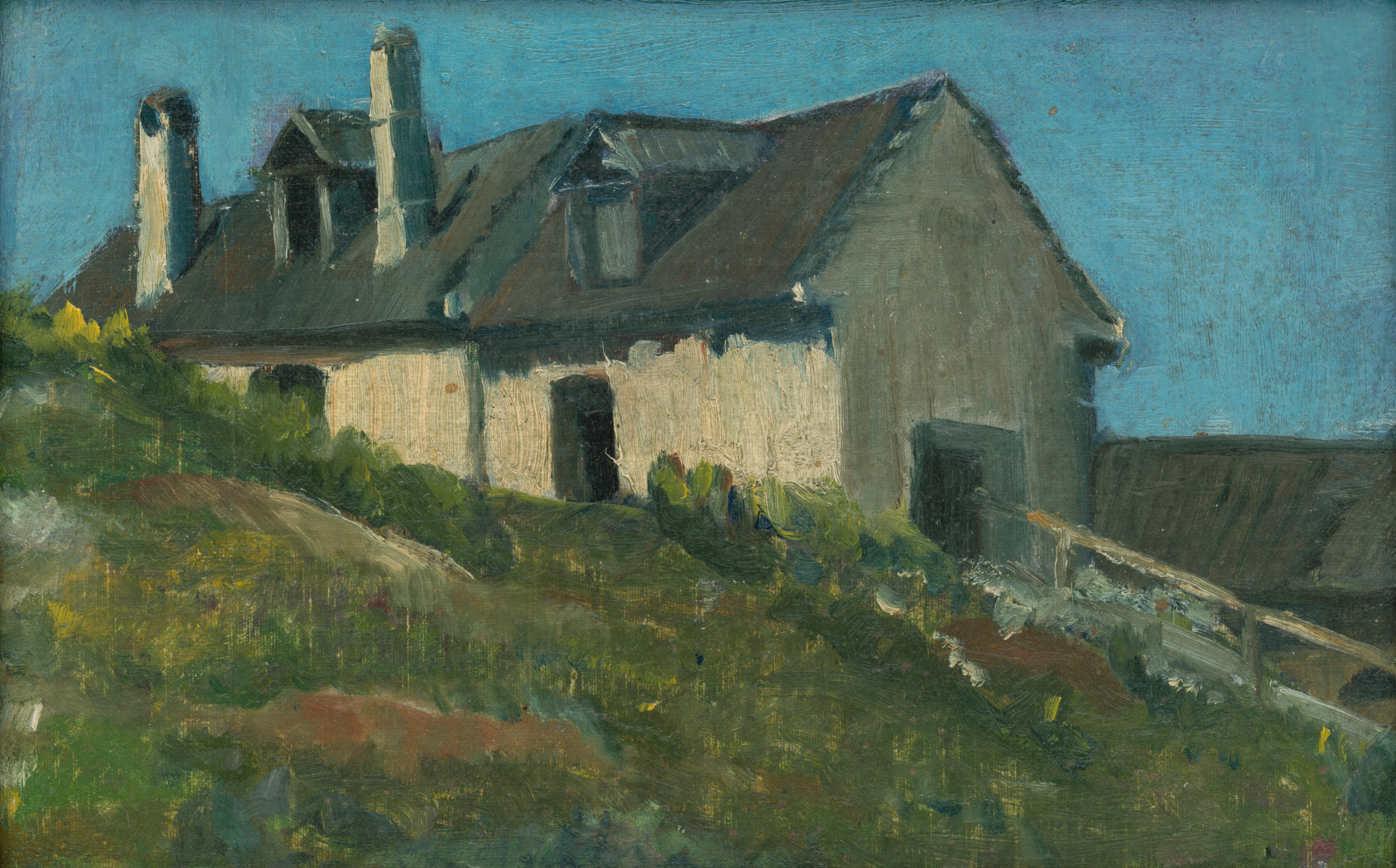
Dedinské gazdovstvo (Village farming)

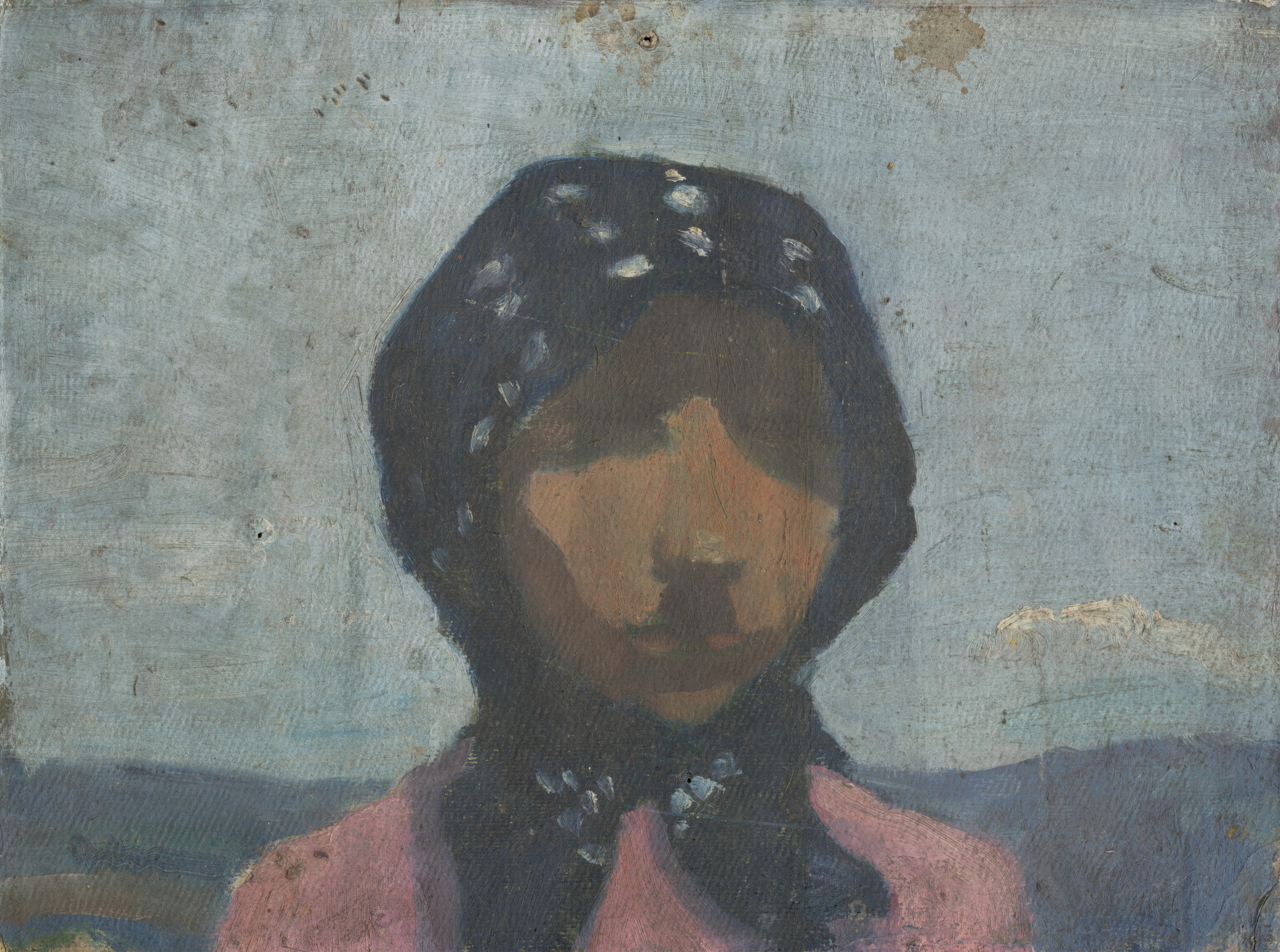
Study of a Peasant in a Black Spotted Scarf
