= Therese Schachner =

Austrian artist (1869–1950)

- Born: 29 May 1869; Vienna, Austria
- Died: 5 May 1950 (aged 80); Vienna, Austria
- Known for: Painting

Therese Schachner (1869-1950) was an Austrian artist.

== Biography ==
Schachner was born on 29 May 1869 in Vienna, the daughter of architect Friedrich Schachner. She was a student of the Austrian landscape painter Hugo Darnaut. She also studied with Albin Egger-Lienz.

Schachner died on 5 May 1950 in Vienna. Her work is in the collection of the Belvedere Gallery.

== Gallery ==
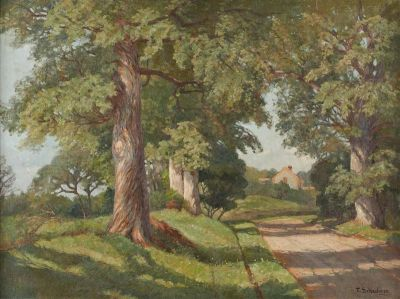
Forest with a view of a clearing

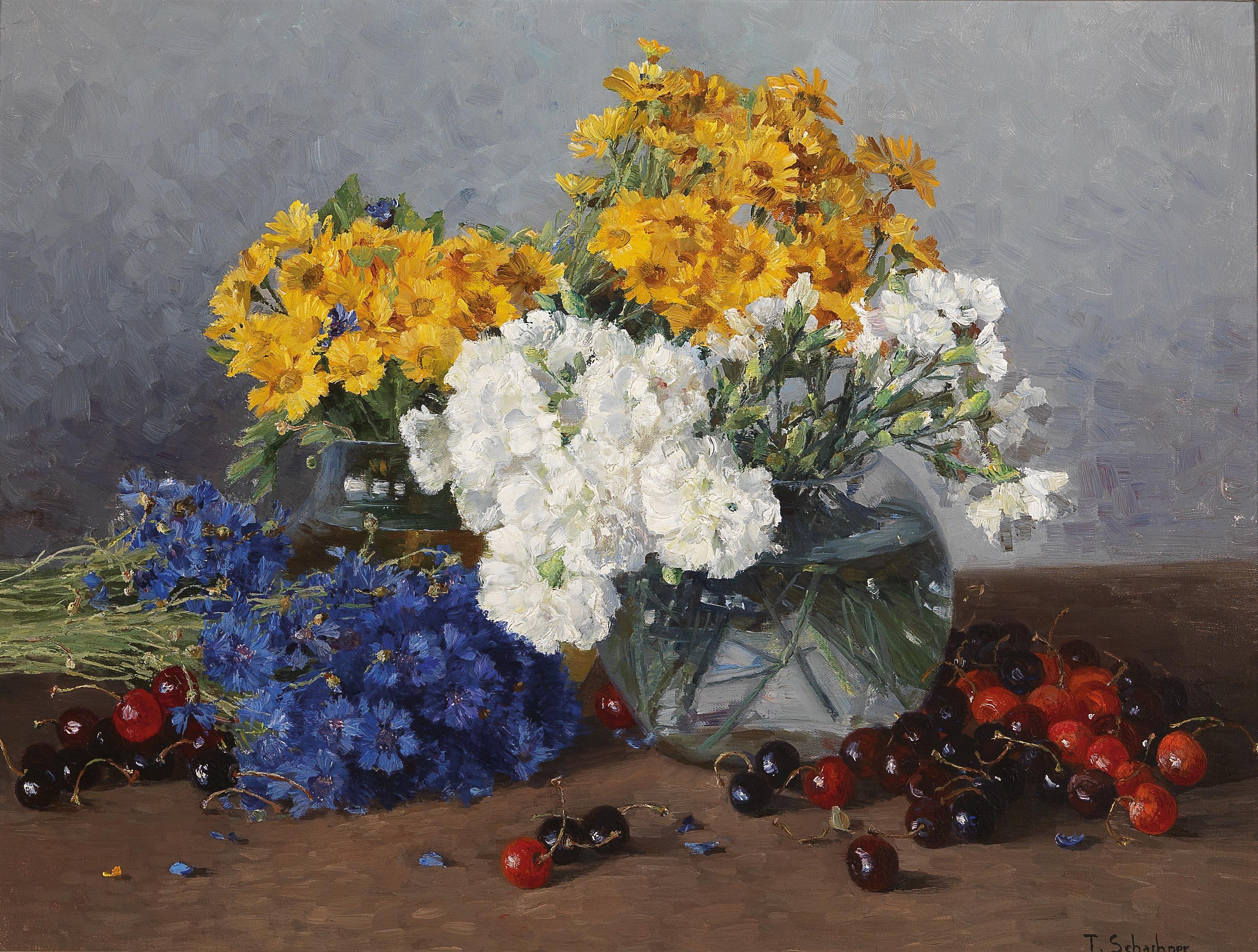
In June

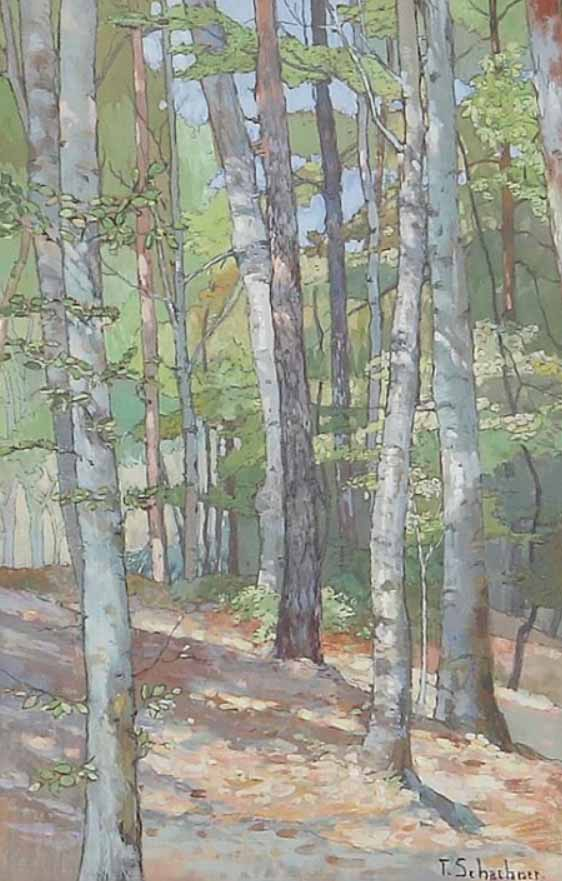
Forest

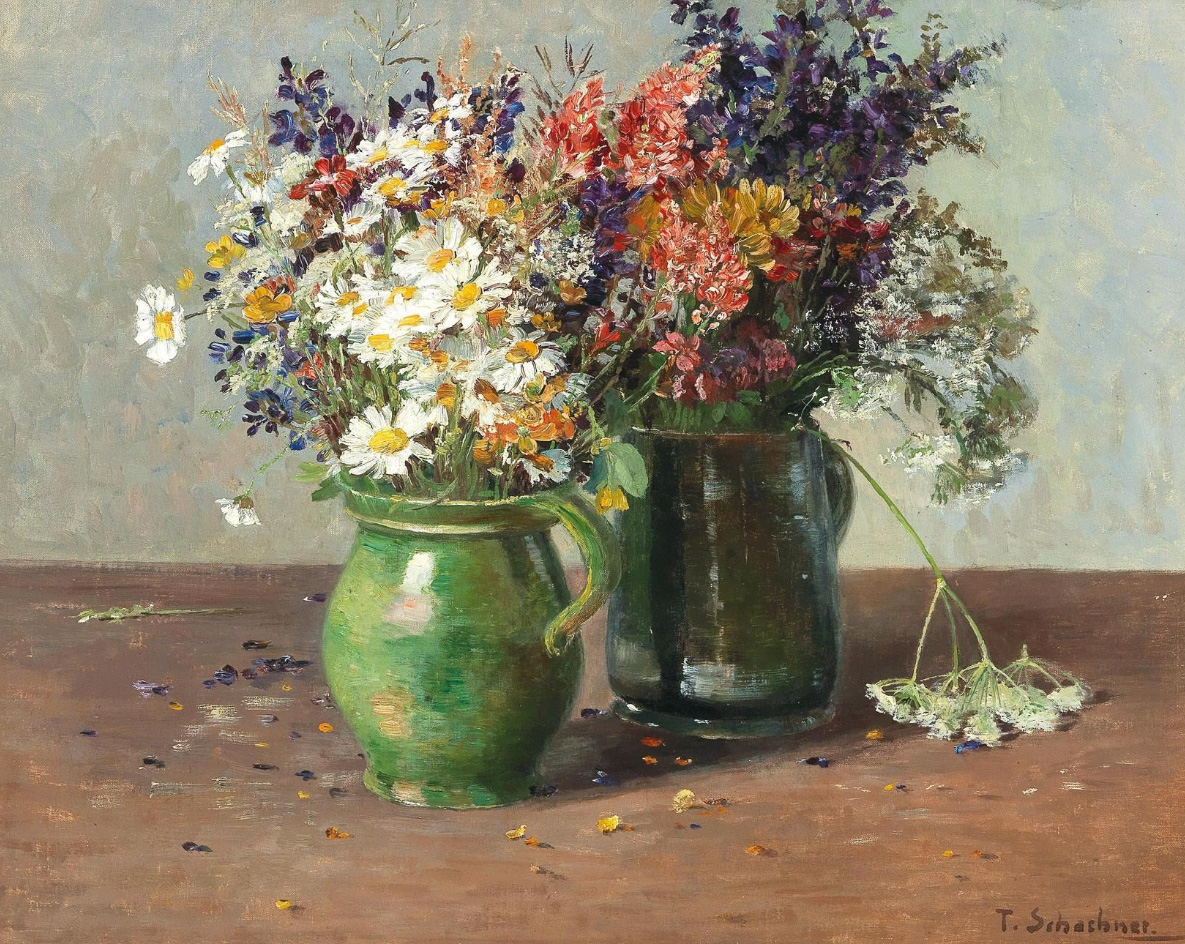
Summer Flowers
