= Marie von Augustin =

Austrian painter and writer

Marie von Augustin (born Marie Regelsberg von Thurnberg: 23 December 1810 – 13 February 1886) was an Austro-Hungary painter and writer. Some of her written work was published under her pseudonym, Marie von Thurnberg.

== Biography ==
Marie Regelsberg von Thurnberg was born in Werschetz (as Vršac was known at that time) in the Austro-Hungarian empire, north of Belgrade and south-east of Budapest. (Today it is in north-eastern Serbia). By the time she was five the family had already moved to Vienna. Her father, Oberstleutnant Regelsberg von Thurnberg, was a career soldier, serving in the Imperial Austrian Army. Her mother came originally from the Transylvanian Saxon community of ethnic Germans who had been colonising Transylvania since the twelfth century. It was from her mother that she acquired her love of painting and literature, along with a sound education: she was devastated by her mother's death, after a long illness, at a time when she herself was still only eighteen.

von Augustin wrote her first serious poetry when she was fourteen, and when she was fifteen she produced "Theodora", her first short story which, like the early poetry, remained unpublished. However, she sought comfort following to her mother's death in 1828 not by burying herself in more writing, but by turning to oil painting. Over the next few years, accompanied by her aunt or her father, she toured the studios of Vienna's leading painters, producing numerous miniature portraits and copying well known pieces from the Esterházy Gallery. (Note: The famous Esterházy Gallery included 637 paintings and 3.500 etchings. In 1870 the collection was sold to the Kingdom of Hungary where it constituted the basis for what has become the Hungarian National Gallery in Budapest.) She copied works by Raphael Mengs, Leonardo da Vinci and Peter Paul Rubens. She produced madonna images and altar images for various churches and monasteries. Of particular note is a fourteen image Stations of the Cross set that she produced for the church at Pyhra, near St. Pölten, to the west of Vienna.

In 1835, von Augustin married Captain Ferdinand Baron von Augustin who was, like her father, an army officer. (Note: According to Marie's entry in the "österreichisches biographische Lexikon" von Augustin was, at this stage, already a colonel ("Oberst"). Von Augustin's own entry in the same work defers he promotion to that rank to 1849.) Because of her husband's career choice, the ensuing years were marked by frequent house moves. Von Augustn now turned decisively back to her writing. Starting in the mid 1840s she published a succession of novels, novellas and poems.

In 1885, von Augustin became the first president of the "Association of Vienna women writers and artists" (""Verein der Schriftstellerinnen und Künstlerinnen in Wien""). She also engaged actively in the emerging women's rights movement.

== Selected works ==
- Novellen und Erzählungen (4 Bände, 1843–1845)
- Der Jungfrau schönstes Ziel : Toiletten-Geschenk für junge Damen, welche nach vollendeter Erziehung in die Welt treten (1844)
- Des Fischers Tochter (1844)
- Gedanken einer Frau über die angeborenen Rechte des Frauengeschlechtes (1846)
- Die graue Schwester (1846)
- Die Sausenburger Klamm (1846)
- Sprossen der Erinnerung. Neueste Novellen (1851)
- Die Rose am See (1852)
- Seelenklänge. Gedichte (1864)
- Die Rose von Granada. Romantisches Gedicht (1873)
