= Hermine Heller-Ostersetzer =

Austrian artist

- Born: 23 July 1874; Vienna, Austria
- Died: 8 March 1909 (aged 34); Grimmenstein, Austria

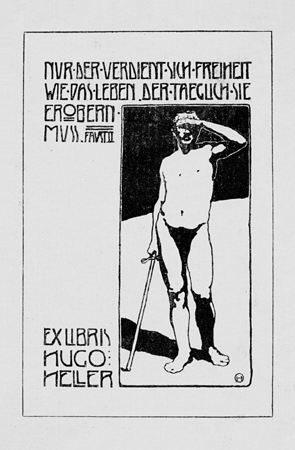
Book plate for Hugo Heller

Hermine Heller-Ostersetzer (1874–1909) was a painter and graphic artist from the Austro-Hungarian Empire.

== Biography ==
Heller-Ostersetzer was born on 23 July 1874 in Vienna, Austria. She attended the University of Applied Arts Vienna. She died in Grimmenstein, Austria on 8 March 1909.

== Legacy ==
Her work was included in the 2019 exhibition City Of Women: Female artists in Vienna from 1900 to 1938 at the Österreichische Galerie Belvedere.
