= Birgit C. Muller =

American fashion and costume designer

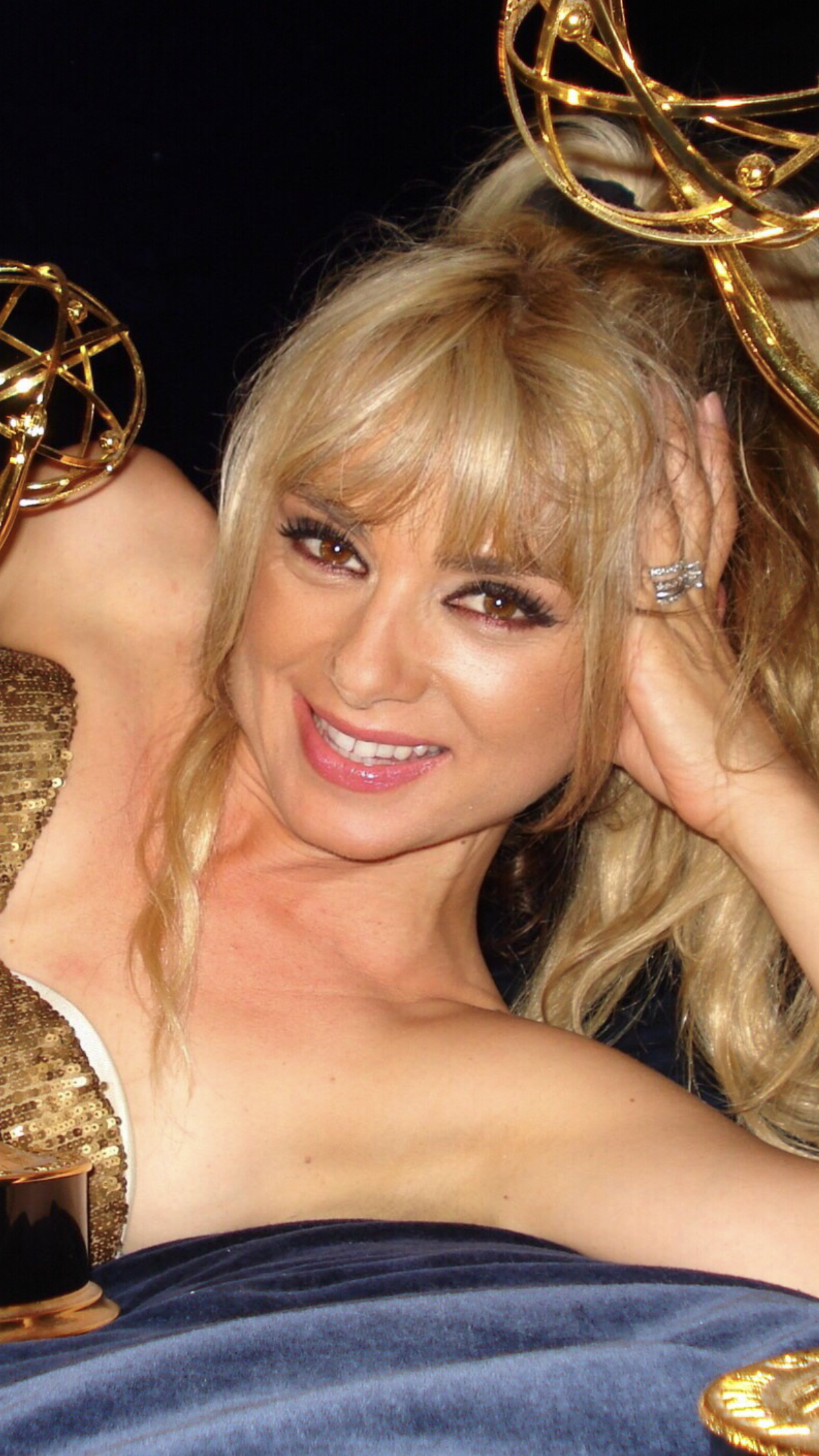
- Birgit C. Muller International Fashion Icon
- Born: Vienna, Austria
- Occupation: Fashion Designer Film Producer Brand Ambassador
- Known for: Philanthropy Fashion Costume Design
- Notable work: Costume Designer CBS "The Bold & Beautiful" Brand Ambassador British American Business Council LA Producer - "Pripyat" Producer - "The Man You Never Knew"
- Television: Costume Designer CBS "The Bold & Beautiful"
- Awards: Three time EMMY AWARD winner "Outstanding Costume Design" "Circle of Hope" Award GOLD TELLY for Producer "CG Tribute"
- Website: https://birgitcmullercouture.com

Birgit C. Muller is an Austrian-born fashion and costume designer and producer based in Beverly Hills, California, best known for her work on the CBS daytime drama The Bold and the Beautiful, for which she won three Daytime Emmy Awards for Outstanding Costume Design in 2004, 2005, and 2006. Born in Vienna and raised in Marbella, Spain, she has worked across film and television in the United States and maintains her own couture line. Her producing credits include Pripyat, a film project in development about the 1986 Chernobyl disaster.

== Career ==
Muller was born in Vienna, Austria and raised in Marbella, Spain. She resides in Beverly Hills, California and has worked in the film and television industry in the United States for Paramount, Sony, Disney and Universal Studios and others, with such noted directors as William Friedkin, David Lynch, Michael Bay, Francis Ford Coppola and Ridley Scott. She manufactures her own line of couture designer gowns, and is a philanthropist for various global humanitarian causes. Birgit Muller is a producer on the multi-award-winning screenplay and film "Pripyat," currently in development, about the 1986 Chernobyl disaster in Ukraine. The screenplay is written by director, and producer Alicia Hayes. A Vero 8 Pictures Production.

Muller is a celebrity judge for the annual Christopher Guy Harrison BritWeek Design Award challenge. She was the brand ambassador for the British luxury furniture designer Christopher Guy Harrison. and she is the founder of Brand Ambassador, a boutique public relations agency that specializes in fashion, beauty, home, and lifestyle sectors.

== Philanthropy ==
Birgit Muller, a prominent philanthropist, has been actively involved in supporting advancements in stem cell technology and organizations like the American Cancer Society. She has attracted a number of notable public figures and philanthropists to these causes, including Morris, Victoria Summer, and Chéri Ballinger, in the Beverly Hills area.

In 2005, Birgit was honored with the "Circle of Hope Award" (for her efforts in help raise more than $800,000.00 for the City of Hope National Medical Center).

2006 - Birgit founded “The Three Doves Foundation”, an organization to raise funds for natural disasters, disease prevention and cure.

In 2010, Birgit Muller's couture gowns were showcased on the runway at the Dorchester Hotel in London for Eva Longoria's Humanitarian Noble Gift Gala. The event supported Eva's Heroes, an organization that helps children with special needs, and the Make-A-Wish Foundation, which grants wishes to children facing critical illnesses.

• Children Uniting Nations Awards Celebration Honoring Metta World Peace Private Residence

• How a Black Oscar dress goes Green

• Birgit Muller Fashion Show Benefitting "Rally for Kids with Cancer Foundation"

== Early Career and Education ==
Birgit C. Muller graduated in London with a degree in journalism, publicity, and promotion. She began her career as an assistant beauty and teen fashion editor at Miss Vogue. Her entry into fashion design came when she styled a photo shoot for Details magazine featuring Guns N' Roses, which led her to Los Angeles for a brief assignment. The six-week trip turned into a permanent relocation, where she worked as a photo editor for Transpacific magazine and styled celebrities like Angelina Jolie. Birgit Muller would later receive recognition in Hollywood for dressing celebrities and creating award-winning designs for the red carpet.

Birgit Muller earned three Emmy Awards for her costume design work on CBS The Bold and the Beautiful, an internationally syndicated television show focused on the fashion industry. Muller is also known for featuring luxury brands such as Chopard, Damiani, and Harry Winston, as well as fashion labels like Max Mara, Armani, and Carlo Pignatelli on the show. She also gained experience as a beauty editor and stylist for top European publications, including Vogue, Vanity Fair, and Elle.

In 2001, Birgit C. Muller joined The Bold and the Beautiful as the in-house fashion designer, marking the beginning of her prominence in costume/fashion design. That same year, she received an Emmy nomination for "Best Costume Design in Daytime TV," and was nominated again in the same category in 2003. Muller won the Emmy Award for Outstanding Costume Design in 2004, 2005, and 2006. Muller also won three Emmy Awards for her work as the Costume Designer on “The Bold and the Beautiful”. Her blog, “Your Style, Your Impact,” emphasizes the global impact of personal style choices.

In 2009 Birgit Muller, costume designer for The Bold and the Beautiful, had her designs featured on Wheel of Fortune. The Emmy Award-winning designer created gowns for Vanna White, who wore them during the show's "Week in Las Vegas"

The Red Carpet Green Dress competition for sustainable fashion in 2012, featured a dress created by Birgit Muller. Made from organic chiffon with a recycled polyester lining, the dress was worn by actress Missy Pyle at the Academy Awards, Missi Pyle, part of the ensemble cast of ”The Artist,” walked the red carpet in a flowing blue gown made from organic silk, hand-dyed with natural mineral pigments and lined with recycled polyester. The gown was designed by Valentina Delfino

Birgit is also the Brand Ambassador and Producer for Miss Liberty America reality show focusing on the excellence, knowledge of the U.S. Constitution and patriotism and grace of women competing in a national competition.

== Additional Reading ==
Bridging Worlds: An Exclusive Interview with Birgit C. Müller

"Runway Revolution: Birgit Muller and Adi Cohen Transform Fashion's Future"

Lunch with Emmy Winning Designer Birgit C. Muller in Beverly Hills

New Bold and the Beautiful Wardrobe Questions Answered!

Nolcha Presents Nolcha Fashion Week: NYC

Équipe technique dans "Amour, Gloire et Beauté - Top Models"

"Miss Liberty America" Producer and Brand Ambassador; Birgit C. Muller

== Awards ==
- GOLD TELLY award - 2023 Outstanding Producer for Documentary "CG Tribute"
- EMMY Nomination - 2011 Outstanding Achievement in Costume Design For A Drama Series; CBS The Bold and the Beautiful
- EMMY Winner - 2006 Outstanding Achievement in Costume Design For A Drama Series; CBS The Bold and the Beautiful
- EMMY Winner - 2005 Outstanding Achievement in Costume Design For A Drama Series; CBS "The Bold and the Beautiful"
- CIRCLE OF HOPE Award; 2005 (for Muller's efforts in helping raise more than $800,000.00 for the City of Hope National Medical Center)"
- EMMY Winner - 2004 Outstanding Achievement in Costume Design For A Drama Series; CBS "The Bold and the Beautiful"
- EMMY Nomination - 2003 Outstanding Achievement in Costume Design For A Drama Series; CBS "The Bold and the Beautiful"
- EMMY Nomination - 2002 Outstanding Achievement in Costume Design For A Drama Series; CBS "The Bold and the Beautiful"
