= Grete Wilhelm =

Austrian artist

- Born: 9 July 1887; Radenci, Slovenia
- Died: 24 June 1942 (aged 54); Vienna, Austria
- Known for: Painting

Grete Wilhelm (1887–1942) was an Austrian painter.

== Biography ==
Wilhelm née Hujber was born in Radenci, Slovenia on 9 July 1887. She was known for her landscape and genre paintings. She died on 24 June 1942 in Vienna.

== Gallery ==
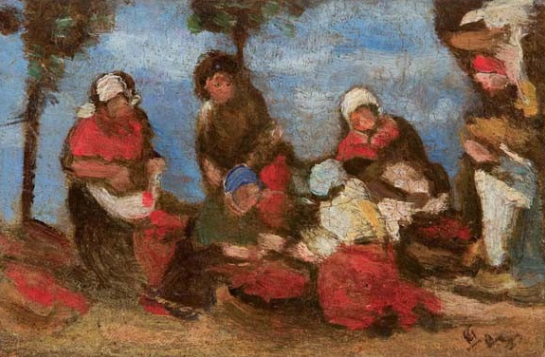
Countrywomen II

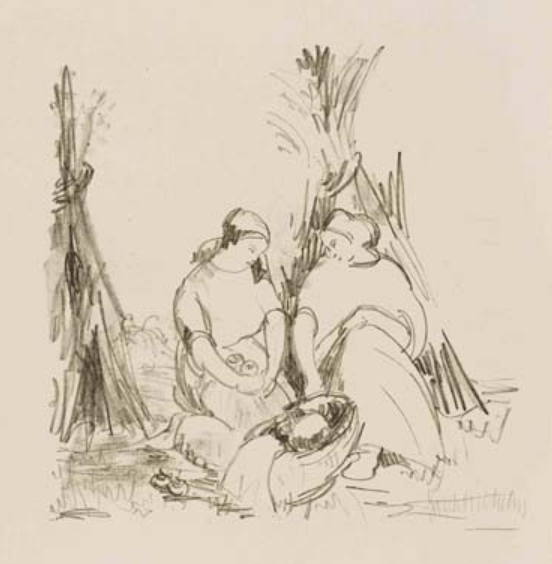
Field workers 1919
