= Felicitas Kuhn =

Austrian children's book illustrator (1926–2022)

- Born: 3 January 1926
- Died: 4 October 2022 (aged 96); Baden bei Wien, Austria
- Known for: Illustration
- Style: Children's books

Felicitas Kuhn (3 January 1926 – 4 October 2022) was an Austrian children's book illustrator whose career started in the 1940s.

== Biography ==
Kuhn was born in January 1926 in Vienna, Austria. She graduated from the Federal Training and Research Institute for Graphic Arts and Media and began working for the magazine Wunderwelt in 1948, where she illustrated the story of the middle pages, in addition to numerous text drawings. Then followed work as a freelance graphic designer. She illustrated many children's and fairy tale books, calendars and postcards, children's playing cards, greetings cards and Christmas designs.

Kuhn married in 1950, and had a son and three grandchildren. From 1995 she lived in Baden bei Wien, where she died on 4 October 2022, at the age of 96.
