= Jutta Sika =

Austrian artist

- Born: 17 September 1877; Linz, Austria
- Died: 2 January 1964 (aged 86); Vienna, Austria
- Education: Höhere Graphische Bundes-Lehr- und Versuchsanstalt; University of Applied Arts Vienna
- Known for: Wiener Kunst im Hause

Jutta Sika (17 September 1877 – 2 January 1964) was an Austrian graphic designer, artist, fashion designer, and an educator.

== Early life and education ==
Sika was born on 17 September 1877 in Linz, Austria. Her father, Alfred Sika, had worked as an inspector for the state-controlled railway system. Around the same year that she was born, the family moved to Vienna. Sika had always had an interest in the arts and in 1895, she began to pursue her studies at the Graphische Lehr- und Versuchsanstalt in Vienna. She remained there for two years before continuing her education at the School of Applied Arts, where she went to study costume design from 1897 to 1902 and then returning from 1913 to 1914.

== Career ==
Sika was one of the founding members of "Wiener Kunst im Hause", a group formed in 1901 that was composed of former students who had attended Kunstgewerbeschule Wien. This group then rebranded itself as Wiener Werkstätte, shifting their attention towards creating Gesamtkunstwerk, a unified system that embraced the concept of a total work of art and all around a unified design for interiors. Sika was also a skilled ceramicist and glass designer working for well-known ceramics and glass manufacturers. Later she went on to design women's fashion for multiple fashion firms, creating accessories and embroidery designs for Austrian fashion brands such as Schwestern Flöge and Wiener Stickerei. She then worked as a graphic designer, working for a Christmas tree decoration firm, tea packaging and making postcards. In 1920, she began to put all of her energy towards paintings when she developed an interest in creating floral subjects. She also worked as a teacher, becoming a professor for a drawing class at Gewerbliche Fortbildungschule in Vienna from 1911 to 1933. During the Second World War she spent the remainder of her time teaching at an girls' secondary school.

She died on 2 January 1964 in Vienna.

== Work ==
Many of Sika's works are in the collections of museums in the United States including the Museum of Modern Art, the Art Institute of Chicago, and the Metropolitan Museum of Art.
