= Marguerite Stix =

Marguerite Stix (June 15, 1904, Vienna, Austria - January 10, 1975, New York City, New York) was a sculptor, jeweler, and ceramicist known for her later work with shells.

== Early life ==
Stix was born Margret Christine Salzer, in Vienna, Austria. Fleeing the Nazis in Austria, she moved to Paris in 1938. There she began designing haute couture ceramic buttons and other small fashion accessories, with pieces commissioned for fashion houses including Lanvin, Balenciaga, and Schiaparelli. She was then held for a short time in the concentration camp at Gurs. After being released, she emigrated to the United States in 1941, living in New York City for the rest of her life.

== Later work ==
In the 1960s, she and husband Hugh Stix began working with seashells. On a trip to major shell-producing sites along the Pacific Ocean, they collected approximately 15,000 shell specimens, bringing them back to New York, where they shortly thereafter founded the Stix Rare Shell Gallery in their home. Stix also began a series of drawings of shells, of which then Curator of European Painting at the Metropolitan Museum of Art, Theodore Rousseau Jr., said "I don't know of another artist of our times but Matisse whose drawings can compare with these!" In 1968, the Stixes wrote The Shell: Five Hundred Million Years of Inspired Design about the history of shell collection and the shell's impact on art history.

Stix also began to make jewelry from and highlighting shells at this time, retailing at Cartier's and with clients including Jacqueline Kennedy Onassis.

== Collections ==
- Cooper Hewitt, Smithsonian Design Museum, New York, NY
- Memphis Brooks Museum of Art, Memphis, TN
- Minnesota Museum of American Art, St. Paul, MN
- Museum of Fine Arts, Boston, MA
- Smithsonian American Art Museum, Washington, DC
- New School, New York, NY
- Rose Art Museum, Waltham, MA
- Walker Art Center, Minneapolis, MN
- Weatherspoon Art Museum, Greensboro, NC
- Wadsworth Atheneum, Hartford, CT
