= Gustl French =

Austrian-American painter

- Born: 17 July 1909; Vienna, Austria
- Died: 24 December 2004 (aged 95); Berkeley, Alameda, California, United States
- Education: California College of Arts and Crafts
- Alma mater: Claremont Graduate University
- Known for: painting, printmaking, photography
- Notable work: Music on the Grass (1945-1989), photo etching, 76.2 x 57 cm, Worcester Art Museum
- Awards: Council of American Artist Societies Award, San Francisco Women Artists, 1971; Purchase Award, Annual San Francisco Arts Festival, 1971; Diplome d'Honneior, Prix de Gravure, Biennale de Clermont-Ferrand, France, 1972; Home Savings & Loan Purchase Award, Annual San Francisco Arts Festival, 1975
- Patrons: Transamerica Corporation, San Francisco; Foremost/McKesson, Inc., San Francisco; Harrah's, Lake Tahoe; Bank of America, San Francisco; A.T.&T., Chicago; Hogan Associates, San Francisco

Auguste L. "Gustl" French (1909–2004) was an Austrian-American painter, printmaker and photographer.

== Biography ==
She was born and educated in Vienna, Austria, receiving a doctorate in modern philology from the University of Vienna. While in Europe, she studied with Oskar Kokoschka.

She came to the United States in 1944, fleeing the Bombing of Vienna during World War II. She taught at Baylor University in Waco, Texas, and moved to California in the mid-1950s with her family. There she studied in Oakland at the California College of Arts and Crafts (now California College of the Arts), and at the Claremont Graduate University in the M.F.A. Program.
