= Elfriede Schuselka =

Austrian artist

Elfriede "Elfi" Schuselka-Capobianco (born February 13, 1940, in Vienna, Austria) is a printmaker, sculptor and painter. She studied at the former Academy of Applied Arts (today: University of Applied Arts Vienna) in Vienna, Austria and moved to New York in 1964 to pursue her career as an artist.

== Biography ==
Schuselka studied photography from 1958 to 1959 at the Graphische Versuchsanstalt (today: Höhere Graphische Bundes-Lehr- und Versuchsanstalt) in Vienna, where she was taught by Ernst Hartmann, among others. She also pursued art history and theater studies at the University of Vienna.

From 1959 to 1961, she continued her studies in the master class for graphic arts under Paul Kurt Schwarz at the Academy of Applied Arts in Vienna. In the Summer of 1960, she attended Oskar Kokoschkas "School of Vision" in Salzburg.

Between 1961 and 1963, Schuselka lived in Italy, studying at the Accademia di Belle Arti di Napoli. In March 1964, she moved to New York to advance her career as an artist. There, she worked not only as an artist but also as a teacher at various art institutions. From 1970 to 1972, she taught at the School of Visual Arts, and in 1973, she taught ceramics at "The Pottery" in New York. In 1974, she was a lecturer at the Pratt Institute in Phoenix and New York, and in 1976, she served as a visiting artist at Rutgers University. Between 1978 and 1980, she taught at the Pratt Graphics Center in New York and, from 1989 to 1991, at Baruch College in New York.

In addition to her artistic work, Schuselka served as the New York correspondent for the Viennese artist magazine “Eufora”. She was also a member of the “Society of American Graphic Artists (SAGA)”, “N.Y. Equity” and the New York Co-Op Gallery “55 Mercer”

In the early 1960s, Schuselka was married to the artist Rudi Stern (1936-2006). In the 1970s, she married the artist Domenick Capobianco (1938–2024).

== Education and early works (1959-1964) ==
Schuselka began her artistic career studying photography but soon transitioned to printmaking. Her early works displayed expressionist and surrealist influences, shaped by her professors like Paul Kurt Schwarz and Oskar Kokoschka. Her time as a student reflects the shifts in her work between abstraction and figuration, a dynamic that also characterized her later work.

== Works (1960s-2010s) ==
After moving to the United States in March 1964, Schuselka gravitated more toward abstraction, while maintaining elements of figurative art, as seen in the lithograph Rain (1969). She employed techniques such as lithography, screen printing, and mixed media, eventually expanding into sculptural works like the “Wall Pieces”. For these, she developed a unique method of creating relief works by weaving a net of jute, covering it with plaster, painting one side, and then shattering the piece with a hammer. This process produced a web of shards and a pile of fragments on the floor, both of which she exhibited. Pastel tones mixed with raw plaster fragments created a rhythmic arrangement of solid material and empty spaces. Cracked plaster edges and frayed jute emphasized fragility and decay. The Wall Pieces evoke elements of chance in both material and process, reminiscent of the Action Paintings of Abstract Expressionists. Art historian Barbara C. Matilsky noted the power of these works to reconcile contrasts, writing: “In these works, the physical and emotional states of chaos and balance, destruction and peace, are resolved.”

Schuselkas prints of the 1970s often combine the familiar with the fantastic as is seen in the lithograph “End of the Rainbow” from 1975. In the manner of Pop Art Schuselka takes an object of the daily life and by adding an unexpected element she turns it into something artificial.

The element of chance not only plays an important role in Schuselka sculptures, but also in her paintings and drawings. In the 1980s Schuselka turns to what art historian Nancy Malloy describes as “dynamic abstraction” that allows her to paint forms that seem to emerge from the surface only to disappear again. In the Parnassus series, which compares the artistic endeavor to ascending the mythical Mount Parnassus Schuselka works with various media and motifs, such as ladders and staircases, exploring the endless process of artistic creation. Her work often reflects personal experiences and social issues.

Schuselka's oeuvre combines elements of Expressionism, Surrealism, Pop Art, and Abstraction. She frequently used everyday motifs to explore the symbolic meanings of space and time, often through serial structures. In painterly and expressive manner her art often explores texture and depth of the surface. Her work is characterized by innovative techniques and material experiments, bridging diverse artistic movements and methods.

== Solo exhibitions (Selection) ==
- 1972: ‘Pie in the Sky and other Flying Objects’ introducing Elfi Schuselka with Charles Klabunde, Daniel Ziembo & Helen Siegl, C. Troup Gallery, Dallas, USA.
- 1974: Exhibition of Prints by New York Artist: Elfi Schuselka, Upper Gallery, Keele, UK.
- 1977: Elfi Schuselka, 55 Mercer Gallery, New York, USA.
- 1977: Wall Sculptures, 55 Mercer Gallery, New York, USA.
- 1979: Wallpieces, 55 Mercer Gallery, New York, USA.
- 1980: Paintings on Mesh, Condeso/Lawler Gallery, New York, USA.
- 1983: Elfi Schuselka - Paintings, Condeso/Lawler Gallery, New York, USA.
- 1984: Elfi Schuselka - Sculpture & Drawings, 55 Mercer Gallery, New York, USA.
- 1985: Elfi Schuselka - Paintings & Drawings, Joan Hodgell Gallery, Sarasota, Florida, USA.
- 1985: Elfi Schuselka - Paintings, Condeso/Lawler Gallery, New York, USA.
- 1987: Elfi Schuselka - Paintings 7 Installation, Condeso/Lawler Gallery, New York, USA.
- 1988: Big Drawings, Neue Galerie, Vienna, Austria.
- 1988: Elfi Schuselka - Installation, Broadway Windows, New York, USA.
- 1990: Elfi Schuselka, Chauncey Gallery, Princeton, USA.
- 1993: Elfi Schuselka, Galerie Gerlinde Walz, Stuttgart, Germany.

== Collections ==
Schuselka's works are included in the permanent collection of the Museum of Modern Art, the Amon Carter Museum, among other institutions.
