= Margarete Hamerschlag =

Austrian artist

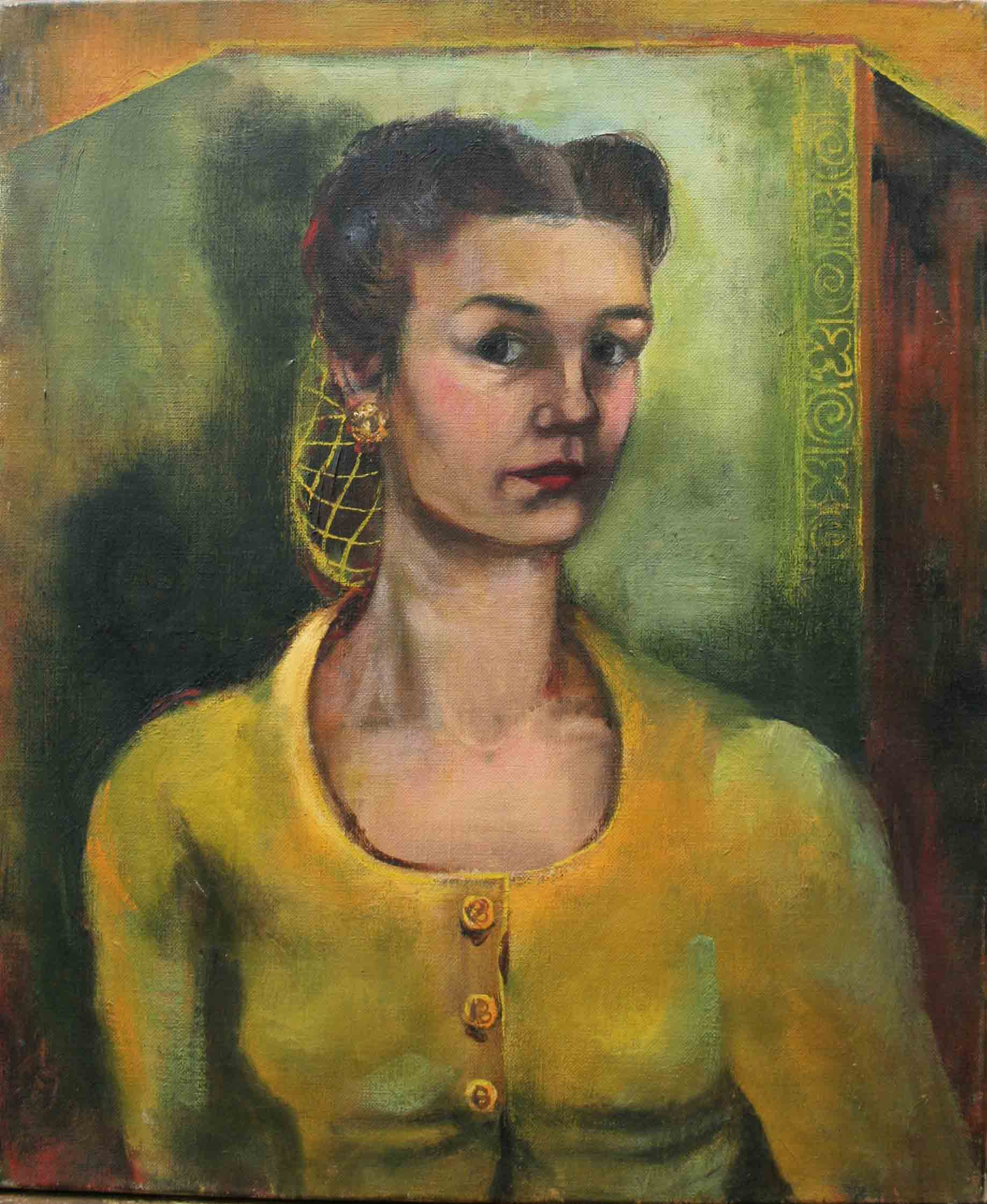
Self-portrait around 1948

View from (hotel) window, Italy, 1952

Margarete Hamerschlag (May 10, 1902, in Vienna – April 5, 1958, in London) was an Austrian artisan, painter, author and illustrator.

== Life and Oeuvre ==
Hamerschlag was born in 1902 in Vienna, daughter of the Jewish physician Richard Hamerschlag and his wife Pauline, born Herz. From 1911 (according to other sources as early as 1908), she attended the Juvenile Art Class of Franz Cižek and studied from 1917 at the Wiener Kunstgewerbeschule with Bertold Löffler (printing), Oskar Strnad (stage design) and Eduard Wimmer-Wisgrill (fashion). Hamerschlag made lithographs for two books, published by Wiener Werkstätte from 1920. With Kinderfreuden, her second book, she had great success. Die portfolios Die Maske des Roten Todes and Die Stadt showed their virtuoso handling of the woodcut and were also noticed abroad. At the age of 20, Hamerschlag became editorial member of the magazine Wiener Mode. As a painter she worked in oil and watercolor. She also designed costumes.

In Rome, she staged several pieces in Anton Giulio Bragaglia's Theater of the Independents and also furnished them. In 1922, she married the architect and Loos student Joseph Berger. Even after the First World War, women only had the opportunity to exhibit as a guest in the artists' associations; membership was still denied. In 1927, the first Viennese exhibition of women's art took place in the rooms of the Museum für Kunst und Industrie, where Hamerschlag exhibited several works. Fritz Lampl wrote in 1928 in German art and decoration: "Margarete Hamerschlag wird, wenn sie die Gefahren der spielerischen handwerklichen Malübung vermeidet … bald in den Reihen der Besten stehen." (Margaret Hamerschlag, if she avoids the dangers of playful craft painting exercise ... soon be in the ranks of the best.) Hamerschlag lived from 1924 to 1934 in the artists' colony on Rosenhügel.

Hamerschlag's husband received an assignment in Palestine in 1934, she accompanied him and exhibited in 1935 in Jerusalem. The couple moved to London in 1936, where Hamerschlag worked as a portraitist and book illustrator, publishing illustrations in numerous magazines and newspapers. Her son Raymond F. was born in 1937. With the "Anschluss of Austria" broke off the connections to the homeland. Not until the end of the Second World War did Hamerschlag change her surname to Berger-Hamerschlag and often signed with Berger. She participated in numerous group exhibitions in England. In addition to her painting, she wrote novels, short stories, and an autobiography. In 1950, she began to teach in youth clubs and published her experiences there in 1955 in her most famous work Journey into a fog with own illustrations.

In England, she was successful as an artist until her death, but fell into oblivion at home. In addition, in many encyclopaedias, auction catalogs, even in art historical treatises her name was now typically misspelled Hammerschlag (with two m’s).

== Memberships ==
- Wiener Frauenkunst
- 1929/30 member of Hagenbund

== Works (selection) ==
- Wiener Werkstätte, ed. (1921), Kinderfreuden (in German), Wien
- Die Stadt: 10 Illustrationen (in German), Wien: Thyrsos, 1923
- Edgar Allan Poe, Margarete Hamerschlag (Illustration) (1924), Die Maske des Roten Todes (in German), Wien: K. Wolff
- Stefan Zweig, Margarete Hamerschlag (Illustration) (1937), The Buried Candelabrum (in German), London: Cassell
- Margarete Hamerschlag (1955), Journey Into a Fog

== Exhibitions (selection) ==
- 2019: City of Women. Female Artists in Vienna from 1900 to 1938, Belvedere (group exhibition)
- 1946: Contemporary European Women Painters in London, group exhibition

== Sources ==
- "Margarete Hamerschlag" (PDF). Galerie Walfischgasse.
