= Irma Komlosy =

Austrian painter (1850–1919)

- Born: Maria Johanna Komlosy; 15 August 1850; Prague, Czechoslovakia
- Died: 17 July 1919; Schrabatz, Austria
- Education: Kunstgewerbeschule Wien
- Known for: Painting

Maria Johanna "Irma" Komlosy (1850–1919) was an Austrian painter known for her flower painting.

== Biography ==
Komlosy was born in 1850 in Prague. She was the daughter of the Hungarian artist Ferenc Komlóssy and studied at the Kunstgewerbeschule Wien. She specialized in flower painting and was compared favorably with Paul de Longpré. She exhibited at Vienna Artist Unit and the Austrian Art Union. She also taught painting.

Komlosy exhibited her work in the rotunda of The Woman's Building at the 1893 World's Columbian Exposition in Chicago, Illinois.

In 1895 Komlosy moved to New York where she set up a studio in the Women’s Exchange Building at 12 East 30th Street. In 1897 she moved to Washington D.C., and around 1905 she returned to Austria.

Komlosy never married. She died in 1919 in Schrabatz, now part of Neulengbach, Austria.

== Gallery ==
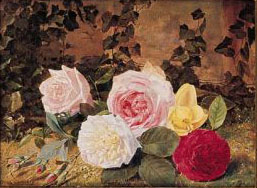
Rose

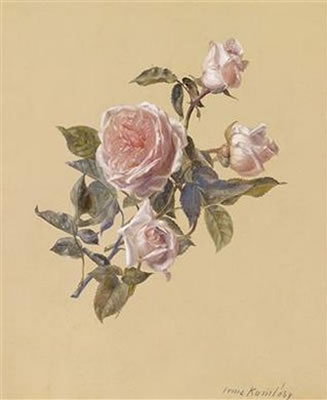
Rose Twig

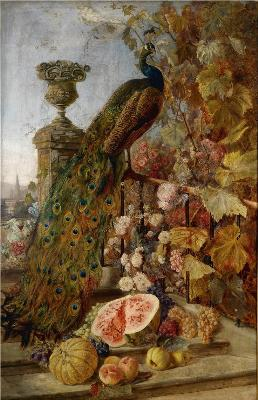
Peacock
