= Betty Kurth =

Austrian art historian, expert in decorative arts and rugs (1878-1948)

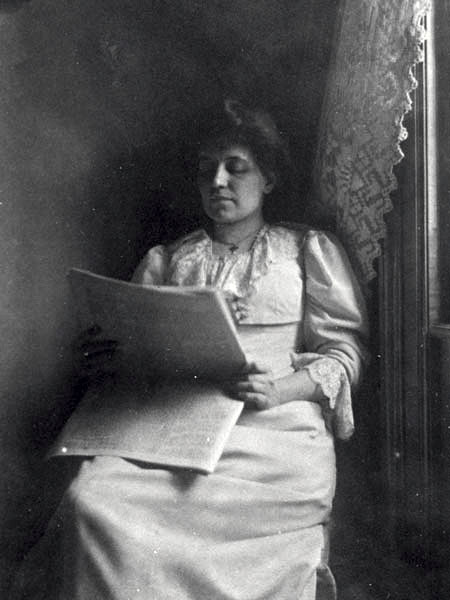
- Betty Kurth, 1908
- Born: 5 October 1878 Vienna; Vienna, Austria-Hungary
- Died: 12 November 1948 (aged 70); London
- Occupation: Art historian

Betty Kurth (born 5 October 1878 in Vienna, Austria-Hungary – died 12 November 1948 in London) full name Bettina Dorothea Kurth, née Kris, was an Austrian art historian. Her research focused on medieval tapestries.

== Life ==
Her parents were the Viennese lawyer Samuel Kris and his wife Hermine, née Morawetz. Betty was a cousin of the art historian Ernst Kris. She graduated from the Lyceum of the Vienna Women's Working Association and subsequently worked as a teacher. In 1903, she married the lawyer Peter Paul Kurth (1879–1924). From 1904, she attended lectures in art history and classical archaeology at the University of Vienna. In 1907, she matriculated as a regular student. She was the first female art history student in Vienna and one of the first women ever to study at the University of Vienna. In 1911, she received her doctorate with a dissertation supervised by Max Dvořák entitled: Die Fresken im Adlerturm zu Trient. This work examined the monument in detail for the first time and placed it in the context of developments in Northern Italy and France since the beginning of the 15th century.

She conducted research as an independent scholar. After the Anschluss of Austria by Nazi Germany, she was forced to emigrate in 1939 as a Jew. The Society for the Protection of Science and Learning (SPSL) unsuccessfully sought a paid position for her. Among other things, she taught at the Warburg Institute in London and lived for a time in abject poverty. In 1941, the Austrian art historian Hans Tietze, who had emigrated to the USA, donated to the SPSL to support her. In 1944, she was commissioned by the Glasgow Art Gallery to catalog the Sir William Burrell Collection of Tapestries. She died in an accident in 1948.

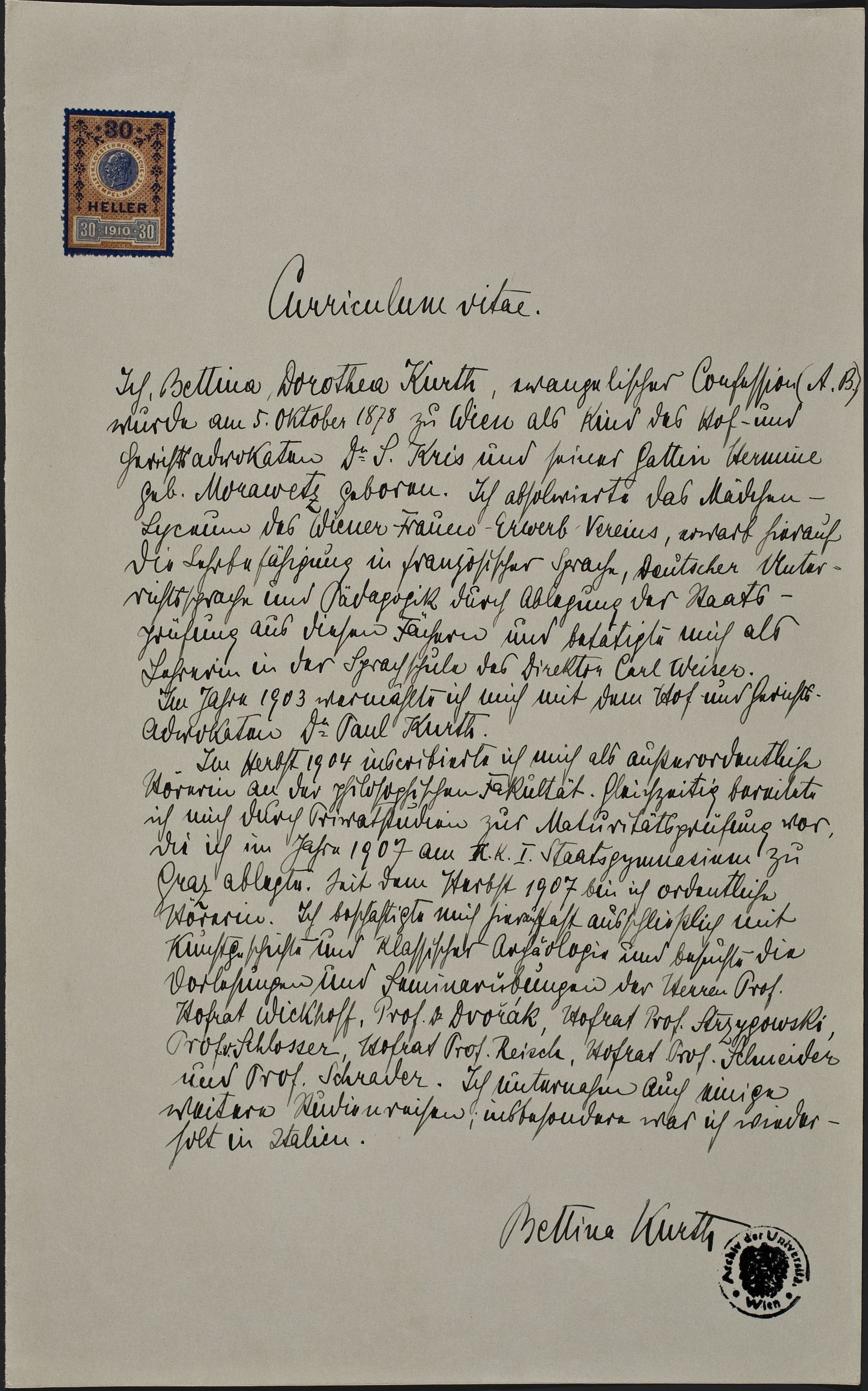
Handwritten curriculum vitae circa 1910

In 1900, she published the fictional diary *One for Many* under the pseudonym Vera. The book "deals with the sexual anxieties and desires of a young girl and her struggle against bourgeois hypocrisy" and went through 23 editions.

Her major work on art history, published in 1926 as a single text volume and two illustrated volumes, is titled Die deutschen Bildteppiche des Mittelalters (The German Tapestries of the Middle Ages). She dedicated it to the memory of her husband and wrote in the preface:

“This publication, commissioned by the German Association for Art History, ventures for the first time to provide a comprehensive overview of German tapestry-weaving of the Middle Ages. In years of collecting work, the German woven tapestries in museums and public buildings, in church treasuries and private collections, and — as far as accessible — all pieces that appeared and disappeared in the antiques trade, were systematically examined and studied: altogether a corpus of over 320 works, whose locations extend across almost all European countries, and even Russian and American collections. […]

Although the work essentially represents a collection of material, whose novelty and first-time presentation may compensate for its shortcomings, an attempt was nevertheless also made to place the individual tapestries geographically and chronologically and to situate them within the overall development of art, while avoiding, as far as possible, purely intuitive judgments — art-historical guesswork. […]

The appearance of the publication, work on which had already begun in 1913, was delayed by manifold circumstances. If the physical and psychological hardships of the war, which made completion of the material collection impossible, had already delayed the completion of the work by several years, these obstacles were far exceeded by the difficulties the work faced in the postwar period. Typesetting of the work began in 1920. The work then stagnated for several years, until its acquisition by the Schroll publishing house enabled its rapid publication. […]

Without the encouragement and active interest of my late, esteemed teacher Max Dvořák, it would not have been possible for me to begin and complete this work. My debt of gratitude is owed in particular measure also to my esteemed teacher Julius von Schlosser, whose constant, lively engagement, suggestions, and perspectives advanced the work in every respect, as well as to Privy Councillor Otto von Falke in Berlin, who, through his wealth of experience and untiring willingness to help, removed many difficulties from my path.”

Separately, another assessment of the work states: “Your three monumental volumes on medieval German tapestries are indispensable not only to all scholars in the field, but are also a model of responsible and successful research into technique, style, history, and above all iconography.” She was said to be the first to recognize the importance of the tapestry workshop at Tournai.

== Publications ==
- Die deutschen Bildteppiche des Mittelalters. Ein Textband, zwei Tafelbände. Schroll, Wien 1926.Kurth, Betty (1926). Die deutschen Bildteppiche des Mittelalters (in German). Wien: Schroll.
