= Irma von Duczynska =

Austrian artist

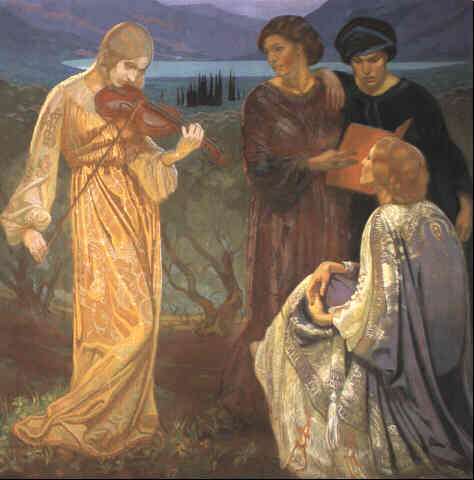
Harmonie, 1914

Irma von Duczynska (27 January 1869 – 19 January 1932) was an Austrian painter and sculptor based in Vienna and Munich.

== Biography ==
Irma studied at the Academy of Fine Arts Vienna with Heinrich Lefler and Ferdinand Andri. She took part in Viennese art exhibitions.

From 1901 to 1914, Irma ran a painting school for women and children with fellow sculptor Elza Kövesházi-Kalmár and Hungarian sculptor and painter Imre Simay

After moving to Munich in 1915, she set up a small studio. She was friends with Michael Bauer and Margareta Morgenstern. In 1931, she came to the pulmonary clinic in Wiesneck, where she died the following year.

Her sister Helena was also a painter.
