= Ernestine von Kirchsberg =

Austrian landscape painter (1857–1924)

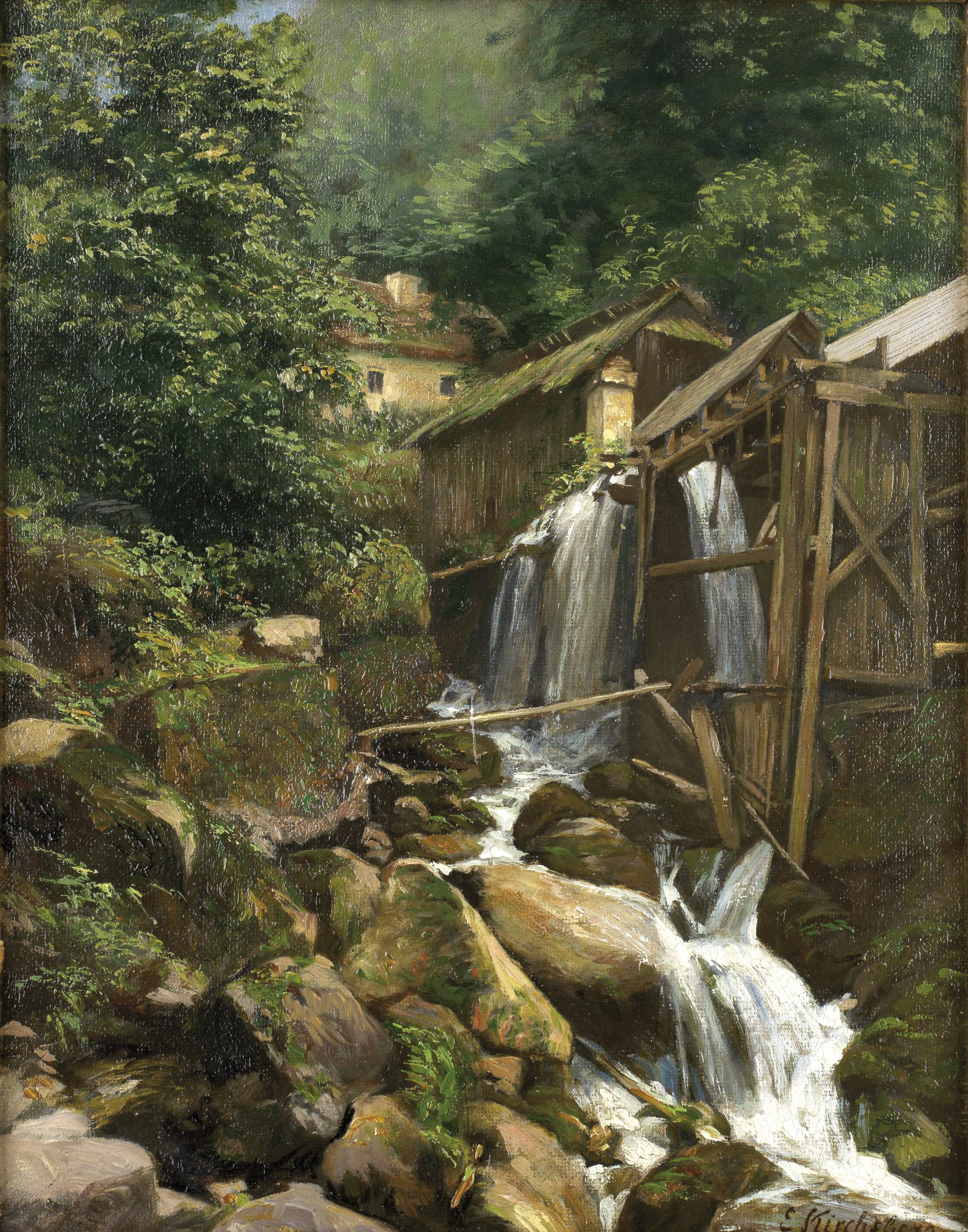
Dilapidated Mill

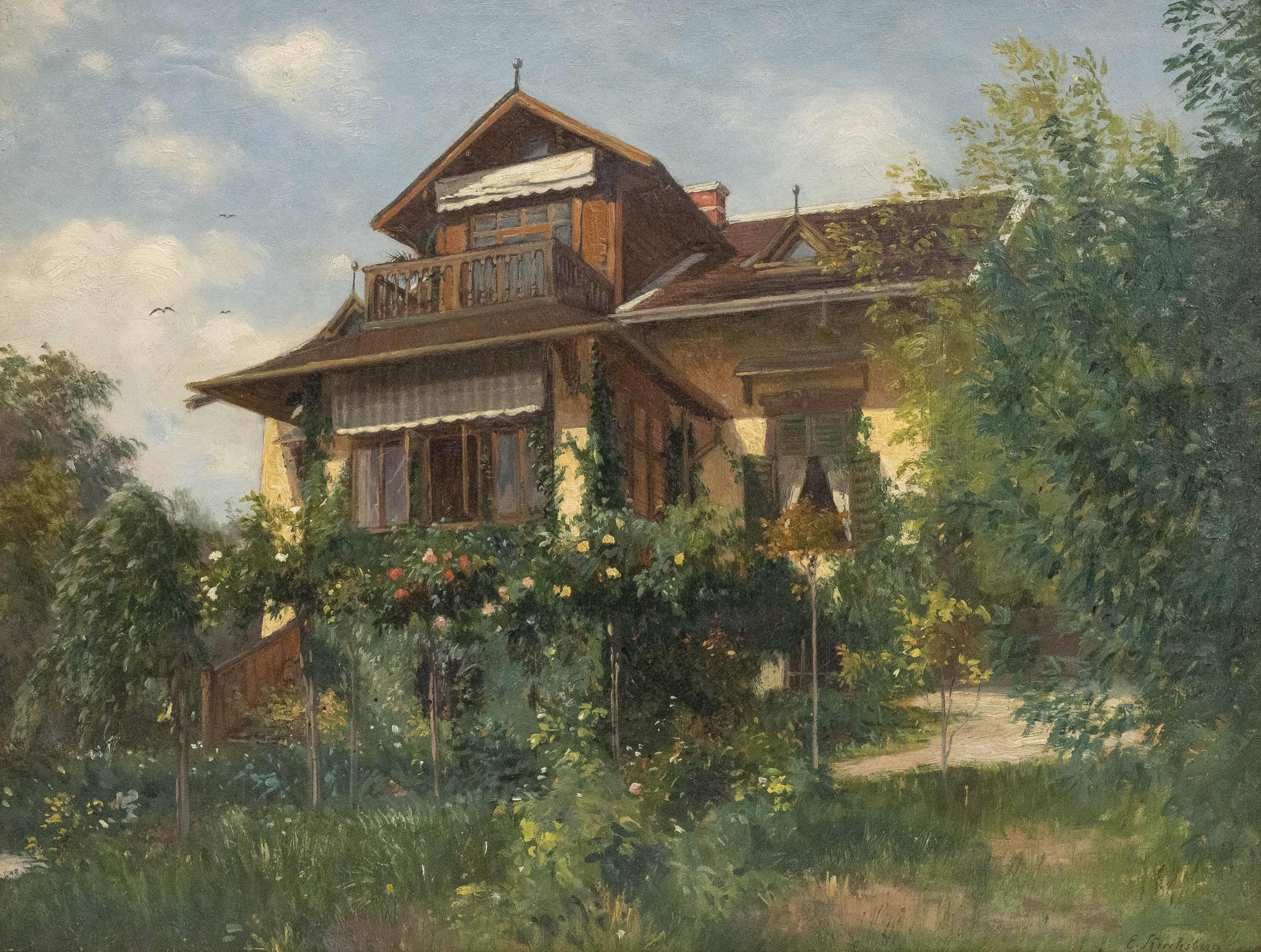
Suburban Villa with Garden

Ernestine von Kirchsberg (12 August 1857, Verona, Austrian Empire – 8 October 1924, Graz, Austria) was an Austrian landscape painter.

== Biography ==
She was born in the Austrian Empire. Back in Graz, she began taking art lessons in 1873 at the "Landschaftliche Zeichenakademie" (Landscape Drawing Academy) with Hermann von Königsbrunn. After 1881, she studied at the Academy of Fine Arts, Vienna, with Eduard Peithner von Lichtenfels, August Schaeffer and Hugo Darnaut. Her first exhibit followed shortly, at the Vienna Künstlerhaus.

It was Darnaut who most influenced her style; an atmospheric school of landscape painting peculiar to Austria, known as "Stimmungsimpressionismus". While in Vienna, she befriended Marie Egner and Alfred Zoff, who she later followed to Munich. There, she completed her apprenticeship with him and Adalbert Waagen, a student of Albert Zimmermann. She also took up watercolors and was initially best known for her work in that genre.

In 1893, she was awarded a prize at the World’s Columbian Exposition in Chicago. She later exhibited frequently in Vienna, Berlin, Prague, Graz and elsewhere; making numerous painting expeditions to the Adriatic, Styria, Carniola and the South Tyrol.

She died in 1924 and is buried at the St.Leonhard Cemetery in Graz.

== Sources ==
- Erich Nußbaumer: "Kirchsberg, Ernestine von". In: Österreichisches Biographisches Lexikon 1815–1950 (ÖBL). Vol. 3, Austrian Academy of Sciences, Vienna 1965, p. 342.
- Manfred Srna (Ed.), Kunsthandel, Gesamtkatalog der Gemälde, Aquarelle und Zeichnungen, Österreichische Gemälde des 19. und 20. Jh., Graz 2009, ISBN 978-3-200-01709-2
