= Eugenie Breithut-Munk =

Austrian painter (1867–1915)

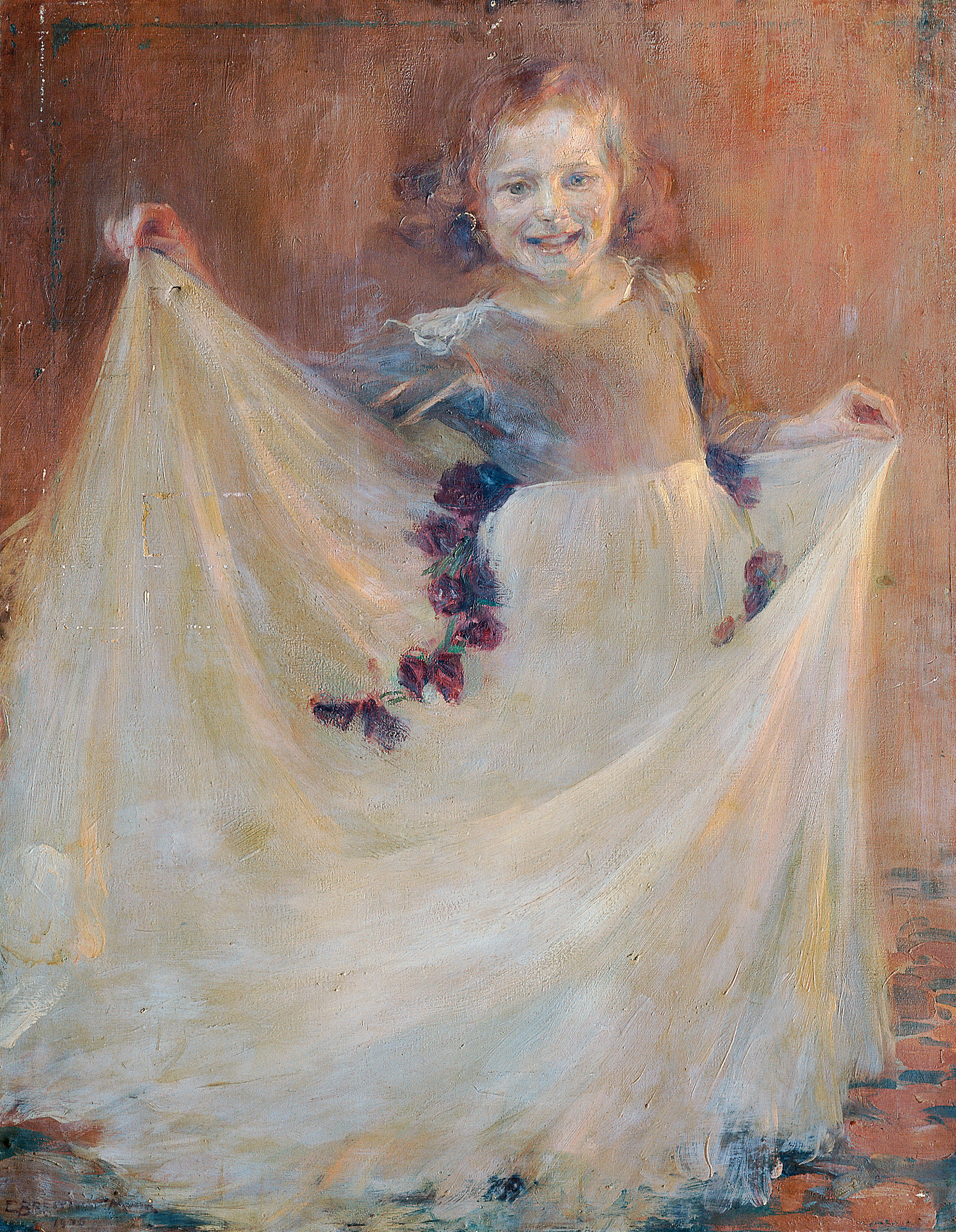
Dancing Child

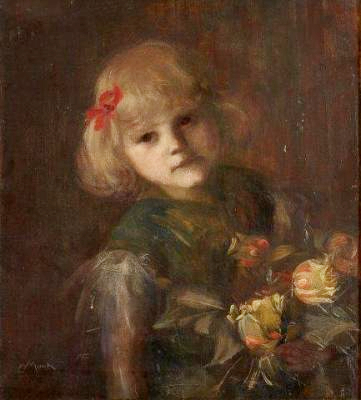
Girl with a Bouquet of Flowers

Eugenie Breithut-Munk (12 July 1867, Vienna - 21 July 1915, Vienna) was an Austrian painter; specializing in portraits and genre scenes. She also designed bookplates, in the Art Nouveau style.

== Biography ==
She learned drawing at the "Allgemeinen Zeichenschule für Frauen und Mädchen" (drawing school for women and girls), from the architect, Franz Pönninger. This was followed by studies at the "Kunstgewerbeschule des K. K. Österreichischen Museums" (now the University of Applied Arts) with Karl Karger and Alois Delug. She then went to Munich, where she enrolled at the Damenakademie (Ladies' Academy), founded by Bertha von Tarnóczy. There, she studied with Ludwig Schmid-Reutte.

A scholarship grant enabled her to make study trips to Paris and London. In 1892, she had her first exhibit, in Paris, at the "Exposition des arts de la femme". She returned to Vienna in 1900. Shortly after, she married the painter and sculptor, Peter Breithut.

In 1901, she was one of the co-founders of the Acht Künstlerinnen, which had the goal of making works by female artists more accessible to the public. The other original members were Olga Wisinger-Florian (who began the organizing process), Marie Egner, Marianne von Eschenburg, Susanne Granitsch, Marie Müller, Teresa Feoderovna Ries, and Bertha von Tarnóczy. Until 1909, they exhibited bi-annually at the Salon Pisko. Other female artists were invited as guests; including Josefine Swoboda, Marie Arnsburg and Hermine von Janda. In 1906, they were represented at an exhibition in Earl's Court, London.

In 1908, she took part in the "Kunstschau am Heumarkt", with Gustav Klimt as the event's President. She also participated in several exhibitions at the Vienna Künstlerhaus, and with the Vienna Secession at the Secession Building.
