= Bertha von Tarnóczy =

Austrian art teacher (1846–1836)

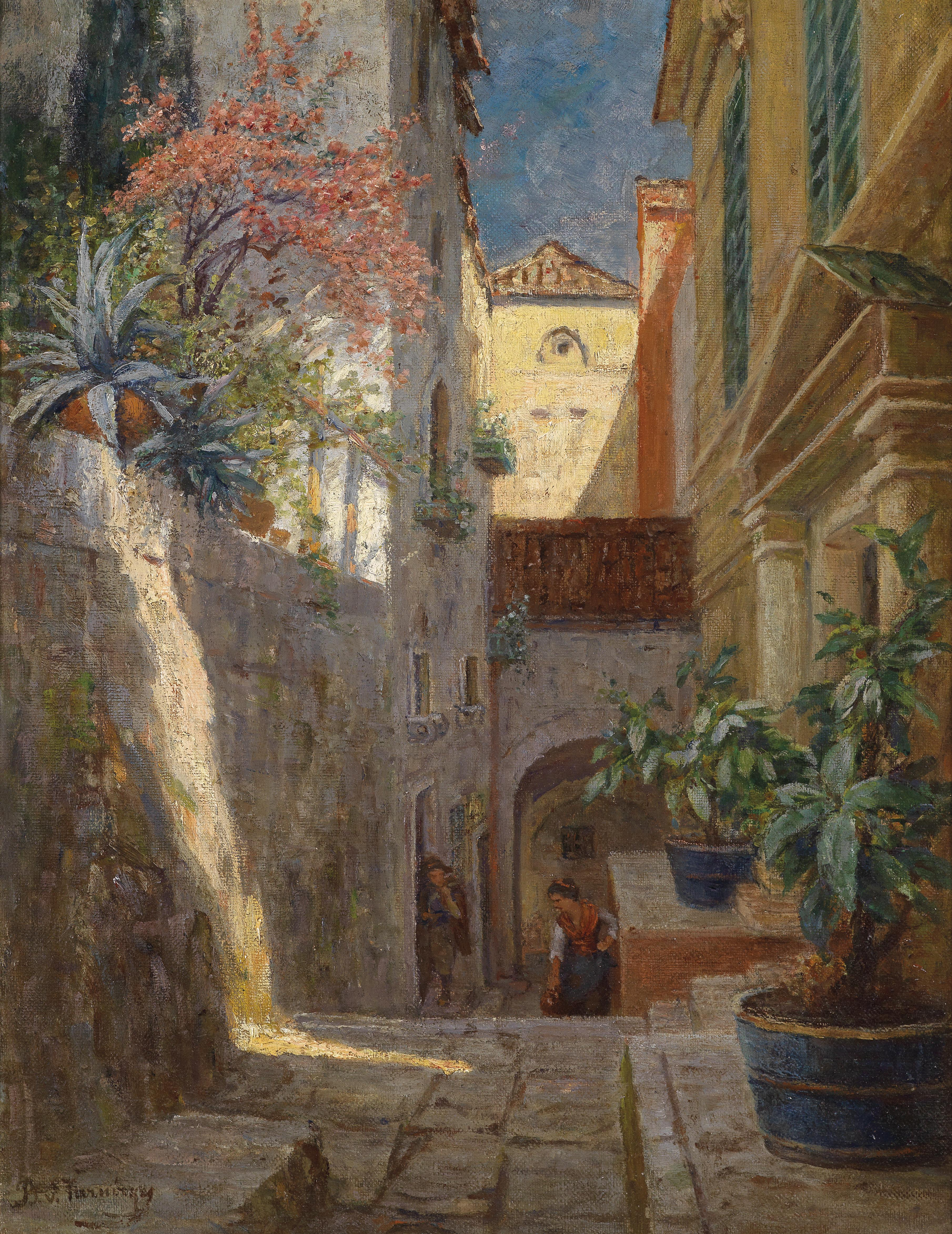
View in a Southern Alley

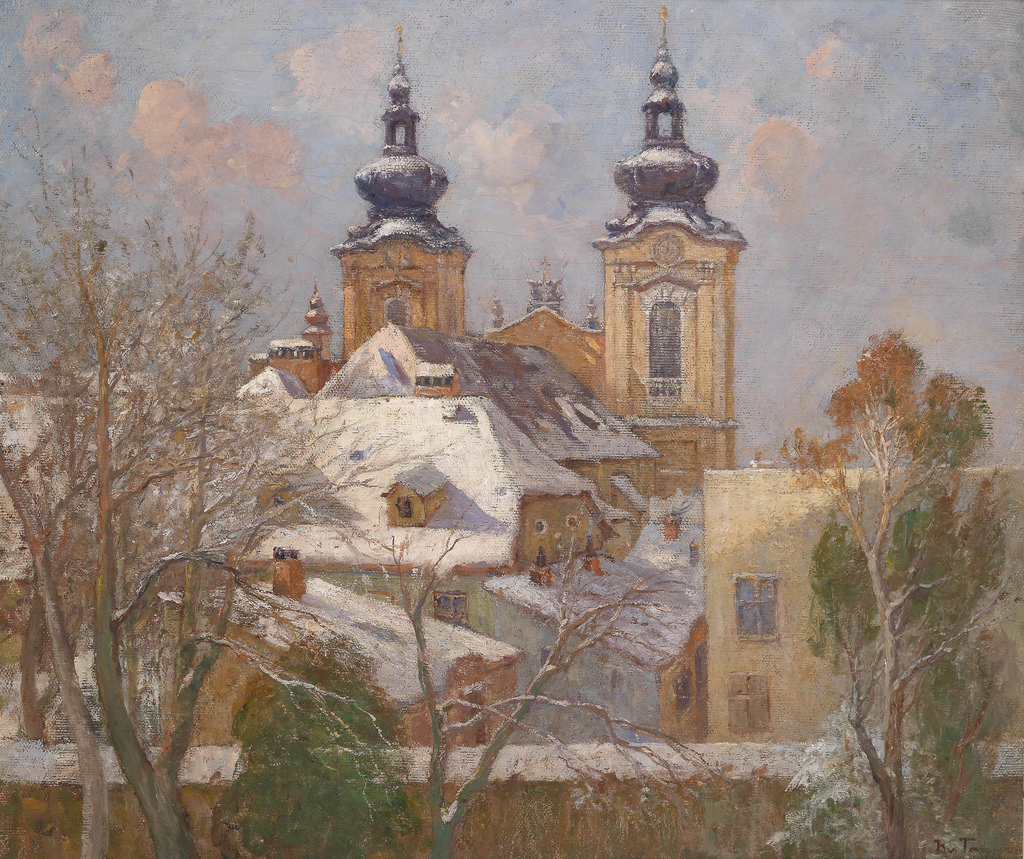
View of the Ursuline Church in Linz

Bertha von Tarnóczy-Sprinzenberg (1 April 1846, Innsbruck - 6 March 1936, Pörtschach am Wörthersee) was an Austrian art teacher and painter, specializing in landscapes and still lifes.

== Biography ==
Her father was the court Financial Director, Karl Ludwig von Tarnóczy-Sprinzenberg and her uncle was the Archbishop (later Cardinal), Maximilian Joseph von Tarnóczy. She attended school in the convent of Sacré Coeur, Riedenburg, where she first displayed her talent for drawing. She accompanied her father on his numerous travels until 1875/76, when she took her first art lessons in Salzburg with Anton Hansch.

In 1877, she went to Munich, where she studied in the Women's Department at the Academy of Fine Arts with Theodor Her and took private lessons from Jeanna Bauck. In 1882, she became one of the founding members of the Munich Women Artists' Association.

For personal reasons, she moved to Vienna in 1886, studied with Emil Jakob Schindler and became friends with Olga Wisinger-Florian. Later, she took several study trips to Italy and Holland and began exhibiting; notably in Salzburg and Budapest. In 1891, she received an Honorary Diploma at an exhibition in Agram (now Zagreb). She also began giving lessons to children of the nobility and, following the death of Michaela Pfaffinger, took over her art school in Linz, which she operated until 1919.

In 1901, together with Wisinger-Florian, Eugenie Breithut-Munk, Marianne von Eschenburg, Marie Egner, Susanne Granitsch, Marie Müller and Teresa Feoderovna Ries, she founded the group "Acht Künstlerinnen" (Eight Women Painters) in Vienna. Later, she became one of the first members of the Austrian Association of Women Artists.
