= Marie Müller (artist) =

Austrian artist (1837–1935)

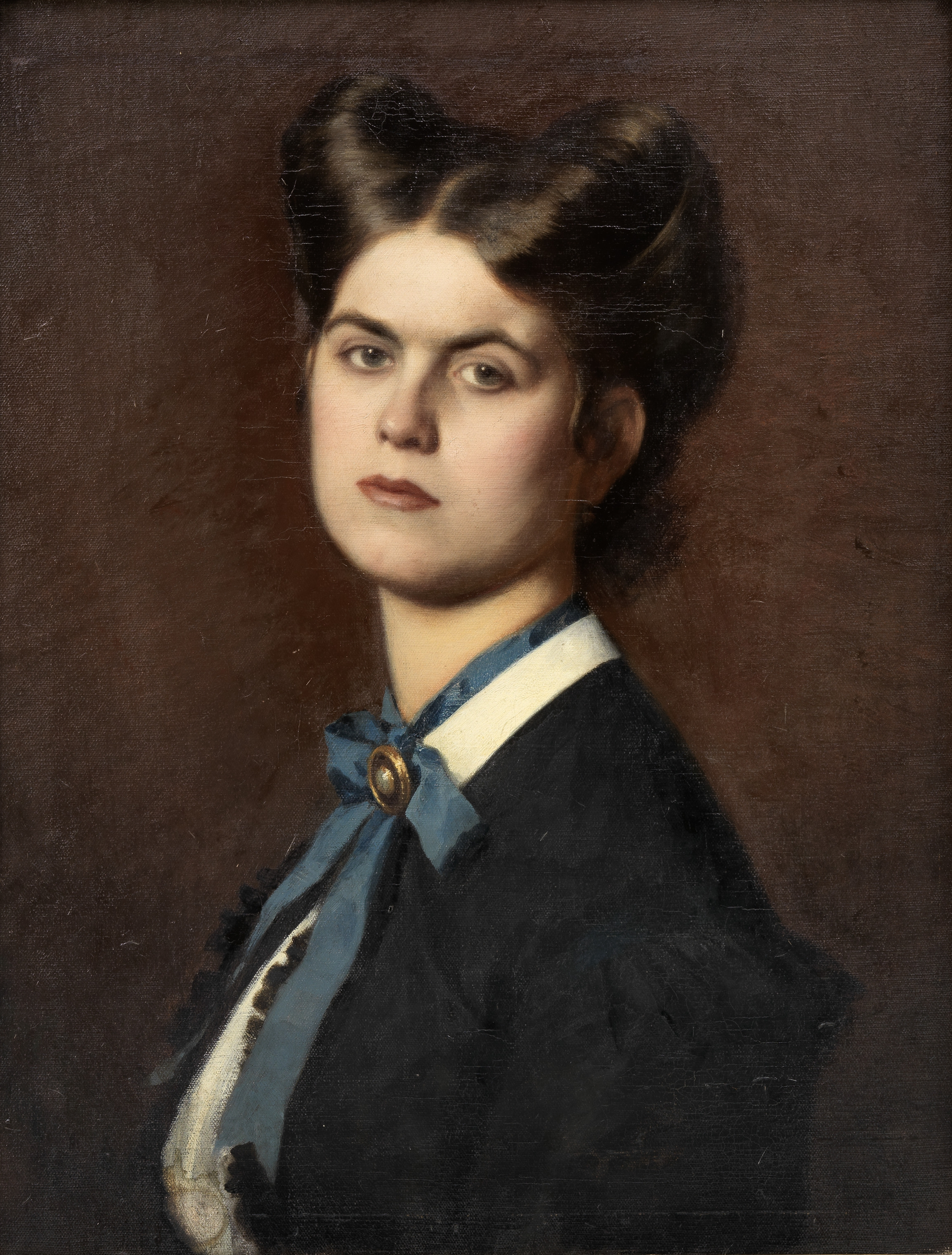
Marie Müller; portrait by her brother, Leopold Carl Müller (1866)

Marie Müller (10 July 1847 – 21 March 1935) was an Austrian portrait painter.

== Biography ==
She was born in Vienna. Her father, Leopold Müller (1807–1862), was a surveyor who later became a lithographer. Her mother, Josefa née Bichler, was the daughter of a master furrier. She had nine siblings, four of whom died as children. Her brother, Leopold Carl, and sister Bertha also became painters. Her sister, Josefine (1839–1906), married the painter Eduard Swoboda.

In 1872, she attended the preparatory figure drawing classes at the Kunstgewerbeschule (now the University of Applied Arts), under the direction of Michael Rieser. The following year, she began taking private painting lessons from Ferdinand Laufberger. She studied with him until 1880. For the next ten years, she worked with her sister, Bertha, as a portrait painter in the studios of their brother, Leopold, at the Academy of Fine Arts. One of the Professors there, August von Pettenkofen, became a sort of mentor. Leopold was known as an Orientalist. In 1883/84, she accompanied him on a trip to Cairo; painting portraits and interiors.

She had her first exhibition in 1886, at the Vienna Künstlerhaus, presenting seven portraits, and continued to exhibit there every year. In 1890, she and Bertha inherited Pettenkofen's studio at the Academy, and worked there until they were evicted in 1902. The city of Vienna commissioned her to paint a portrait of the novelist, Marie von Ebner-Eschenbach, in 1891. The two became friends and corresponded regularly.

Around 1900, she became one the founding members of Acht Künstlerinnen, which had the goal of making works by female artists more accessible to the public. The other original members were Olga Wisinger-Florian (who began the organizing process), Marie Egner, Marianne von Eschenburg, Susanne Granitsch, Eugenie Breithut-Munk, Teresa Feoderovna Ries, and Bertha von Tarnóczy. Until 1909, they exhibited bi-annually at the Salon Pisko.

During the post-war period of hyperinflation, she and Bertha lost a considerable amount of money. She was an agent for Leopold's works from 1925 until 1931, and organized a memorial exhibition in 1932. That same year, she sold her letters and cards from Ebner-Eschenbach to the Vienna State Library. She died in 1935 in Vienna.

== Selected portraits ==
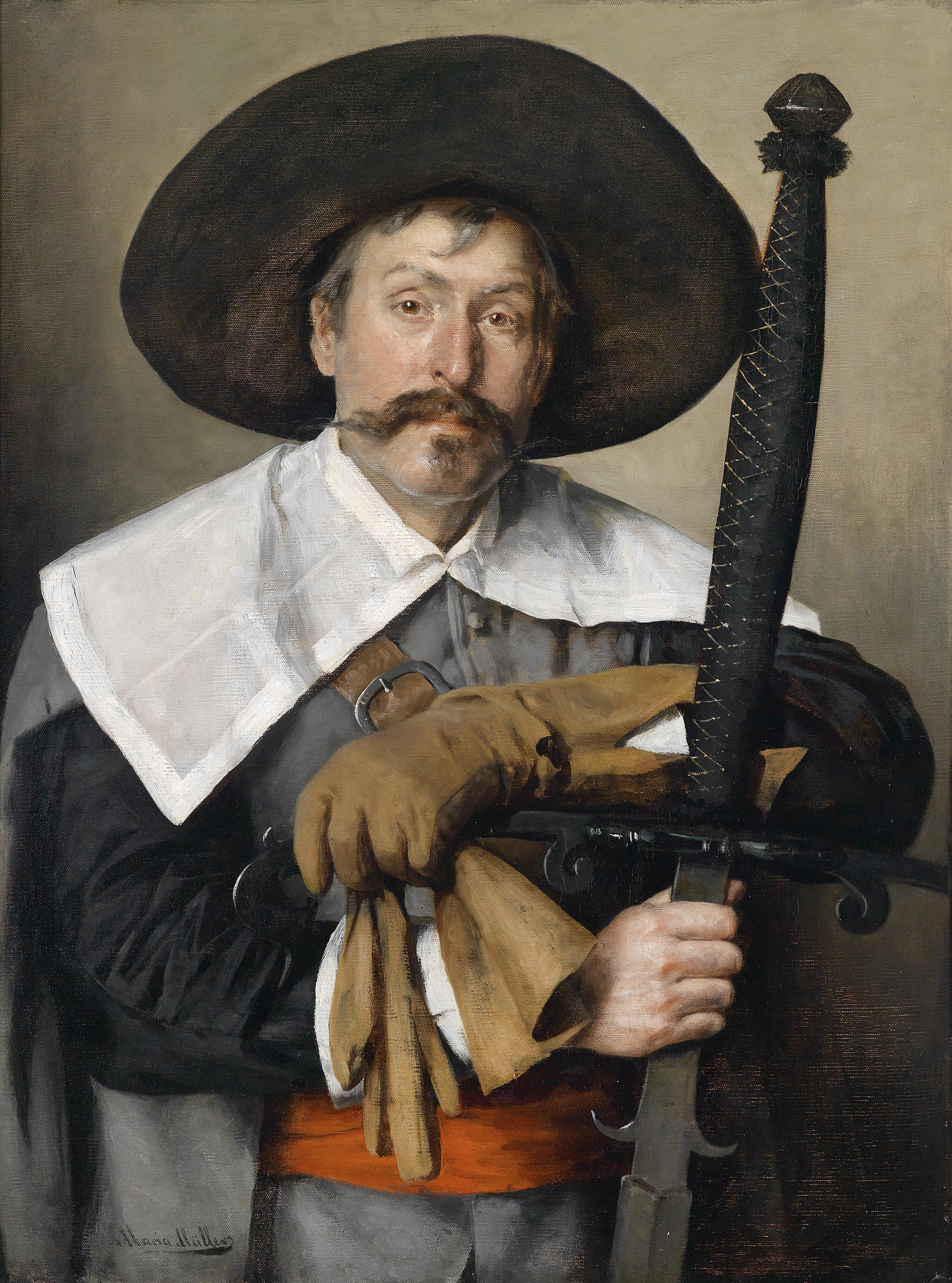
Landsknecht

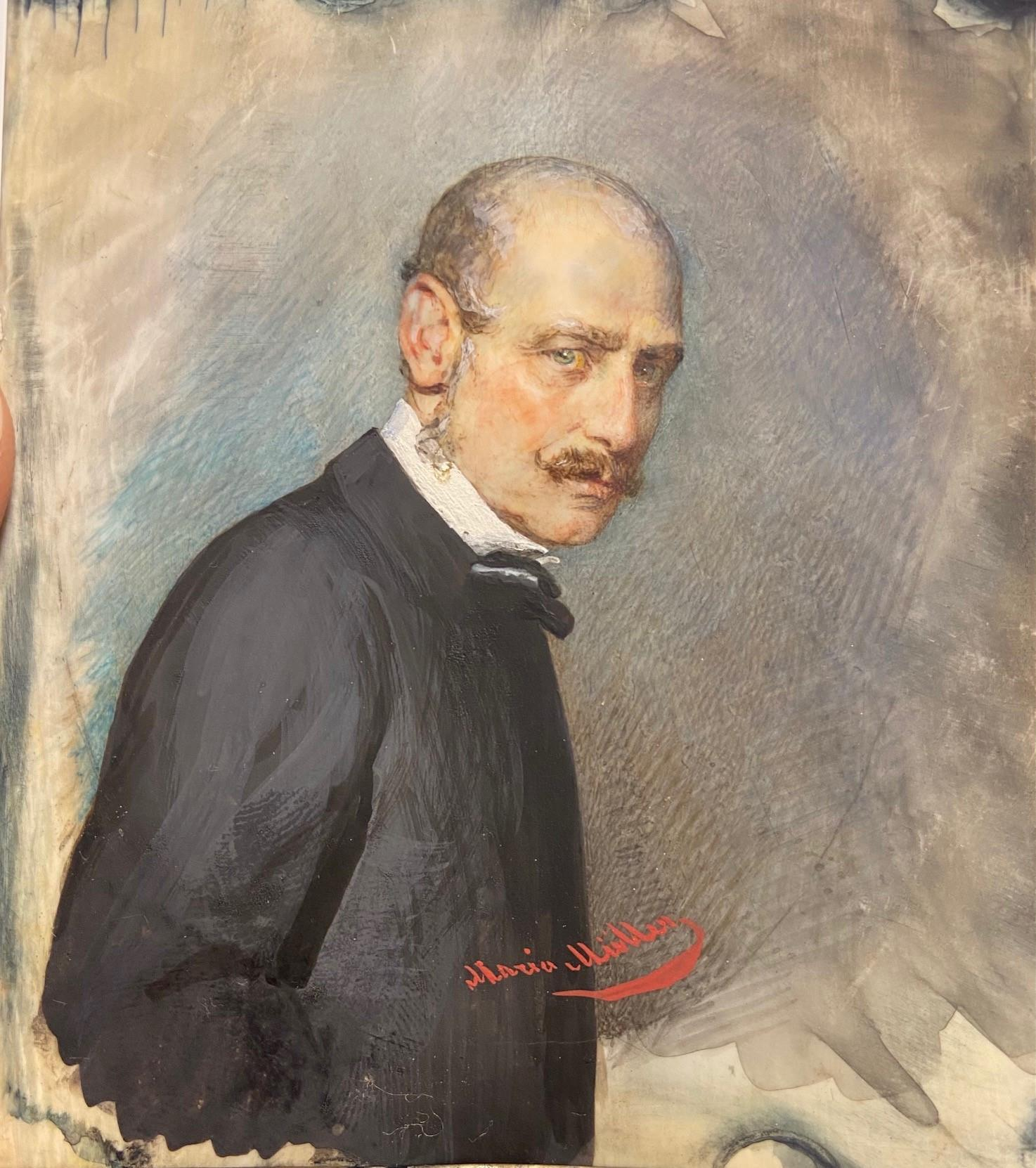
August von Pettenkofen

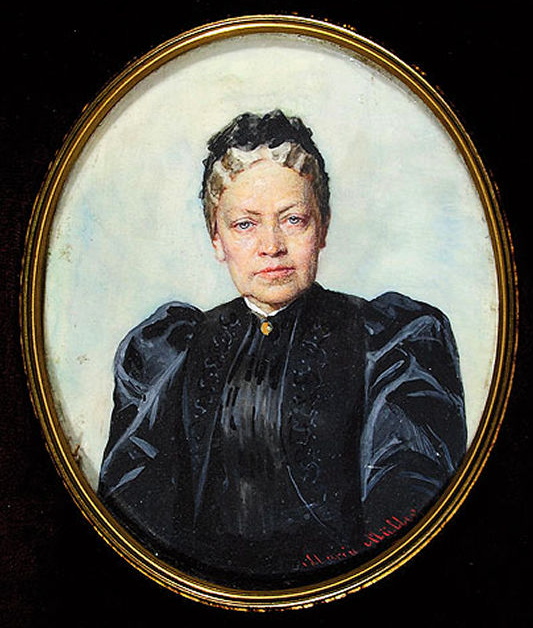
Marie von Ebner-Eschenbach

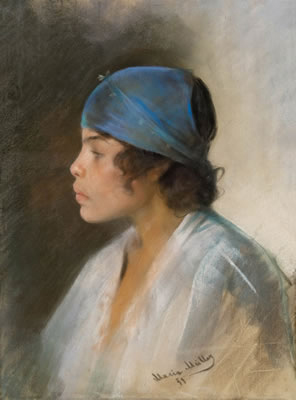
Neapolitan Boy

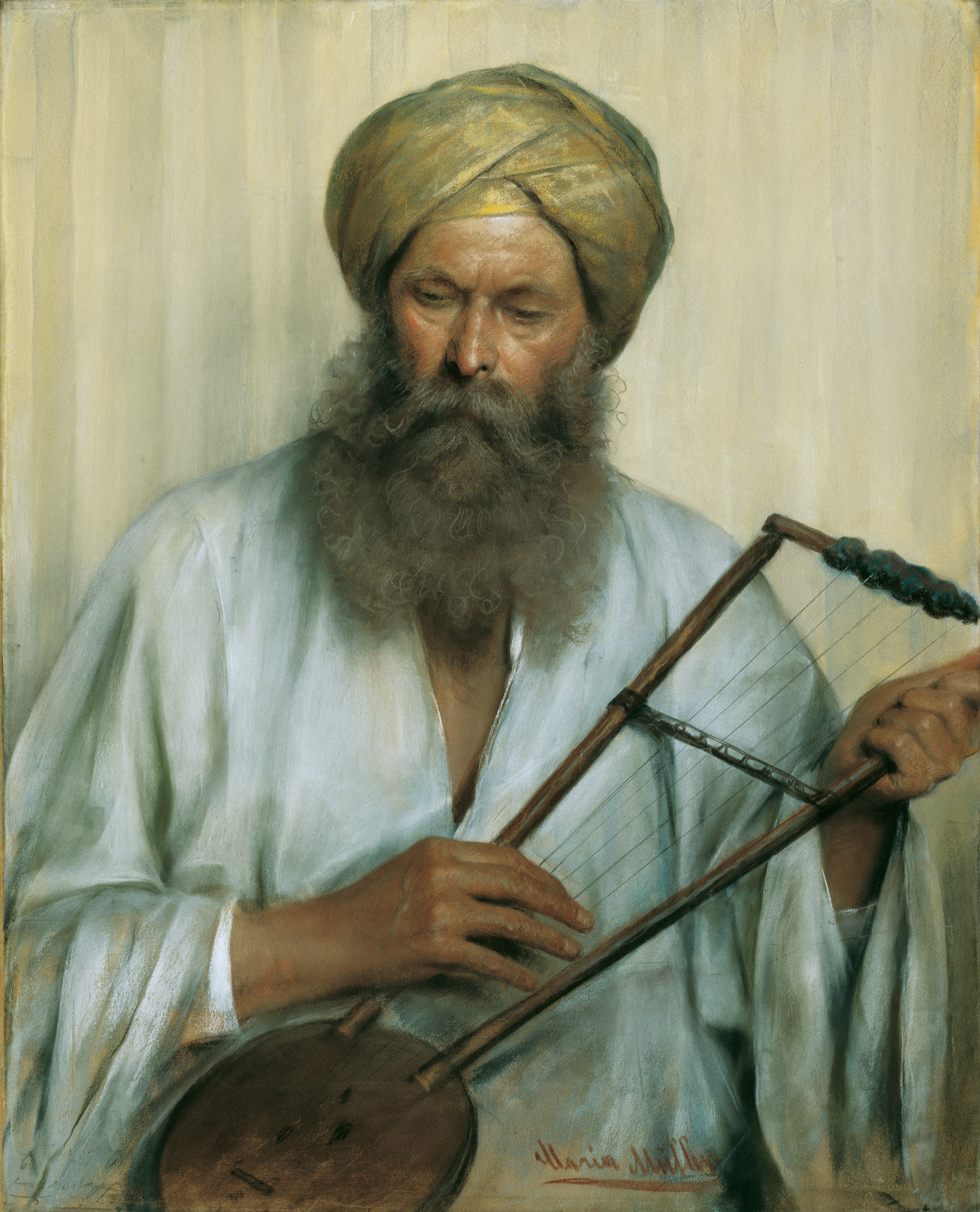
Oriental in White
Caftan and Turban,
Belvedere Museum.
