= Alfred Zoff =

Austrian painter

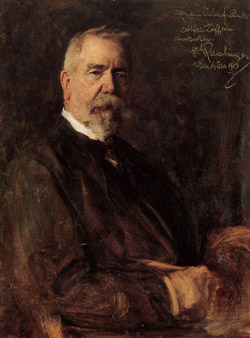
Alfred Zoff (1913); portrait by Heinrich Rauchinger.

Alfred Zoff (11 December 1852, in Graz – 12 August 1927, in Graz) was an Austrian Post-Impressionist landscape painter.

== Biography ==
His father was a doctor who originally came from Carinthia. He decided to become an artist at an early age and, although he began by studying medicine, in 1869 he took classes at the State Drawing Academy in Graz with the landscape painter, Hermann von Königsbrunn.

By 1880, he had decided on art as a career and was enrolled at the Academy of Fine Arts, Vienna, where he studied with Eduard Peithner von Lichtenfels. After his father's death in 1882, his mother moved to Klagenfurt and he would often visit there to paint. It remained a favorite location for the rest of his life. He also made occasional trips to Italy and Belgium.

He completed his studies in 1890 at the Academy of Fine Arts, Karlsruhe, with Gustav Schönleber, who acquainted him the Barbizon school of landscape painting. After that, he lived in Munich and Krems an der Donau. From 1907, he was a professor of landscape and still-life painting at the academy in Graz, where he was an exponent of the Viennese style known as "Stimmungsimpressionismus" (Mood Impressionism).

He received numerous awards, including a bronze medal at the Exposition Universelle (1900). His memberships included the Künstlerhaus Wien (from 1883) and the Hagenbund (from 1900). In 1927, shortly before his death, he was officially granted citizenship (Bürgerrechte) by the city of Graz.

== Selected paintings ==
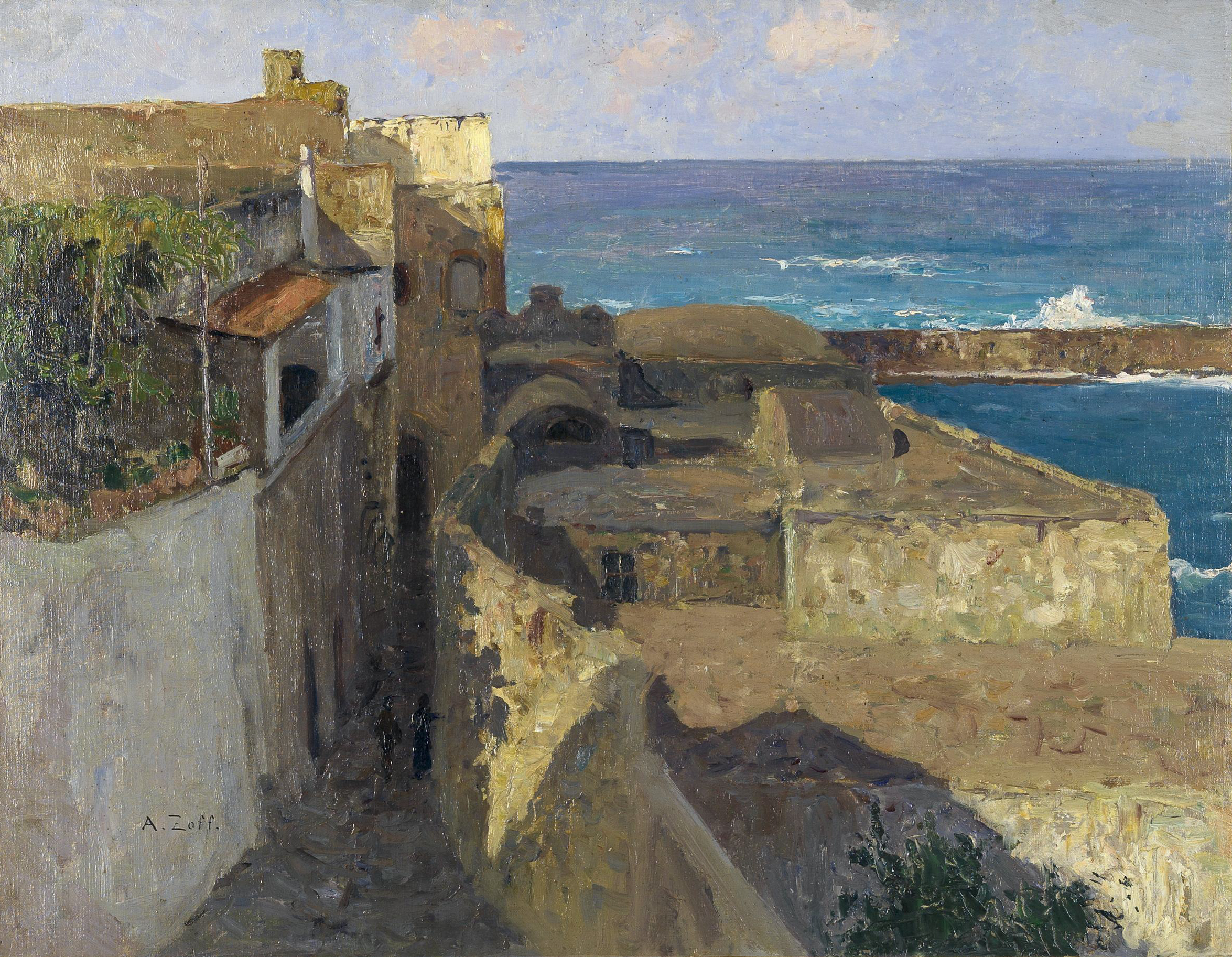
Alley in Forio

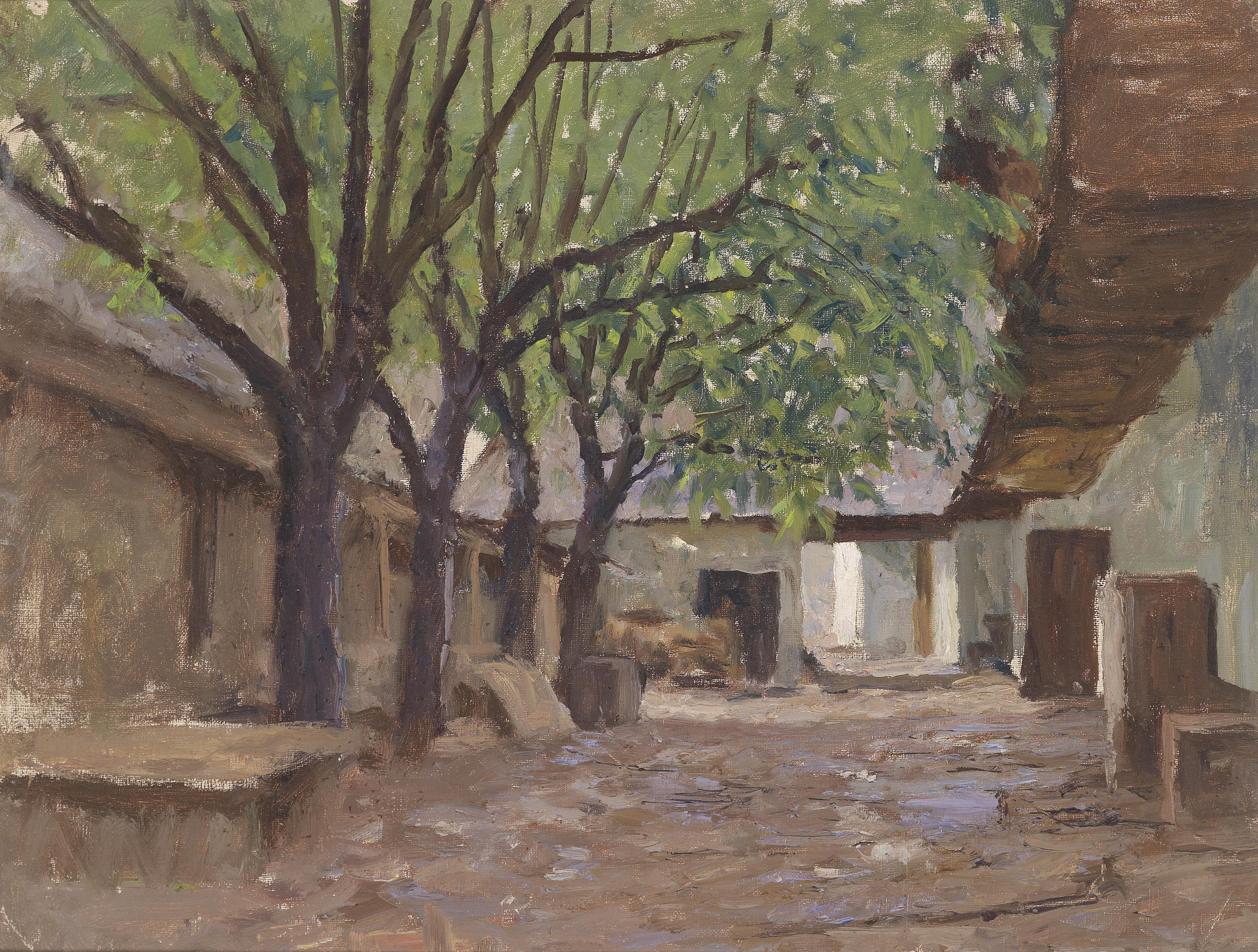
Farmhouses in Klagenfurt

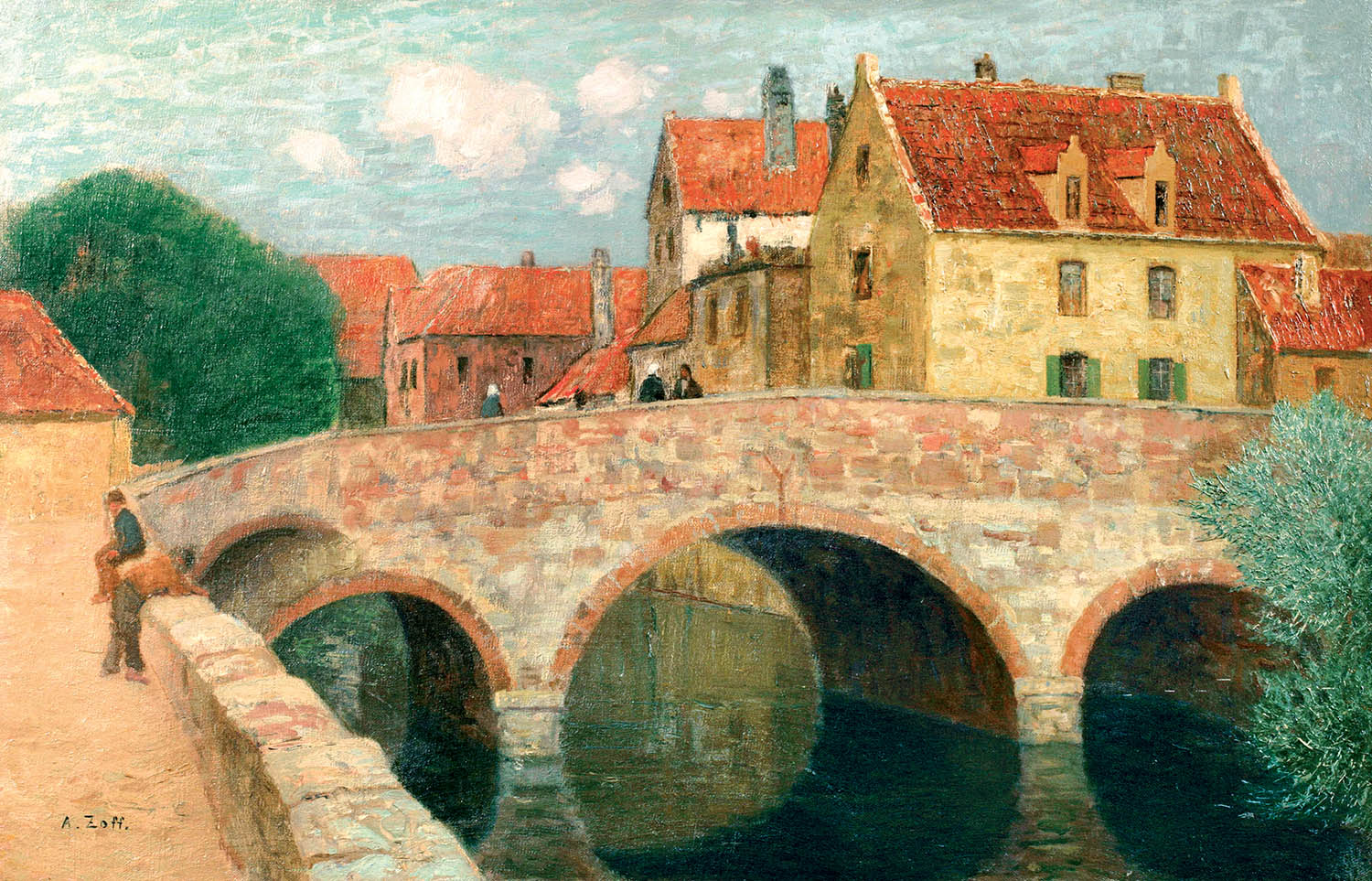
Quay des Menetriers in Bruges
