= Tina Blau =

Austrian painter (1845–1916)

Tina Blau-Lang
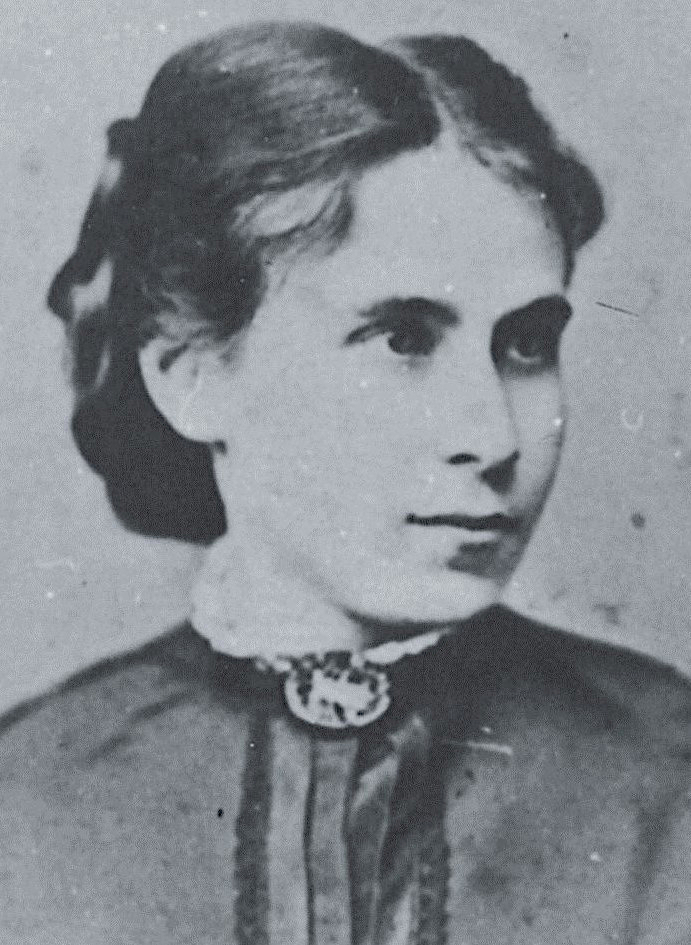
- Tina Blau (1870s)
- Born: Tina Blau; 15 November 1845; Vienna, Austrian Empire
- Died: 30 October 1916 (aged 70); Vienna, Austria-Hungary
- Known for: Painting
- Spouse: Heinrich Lang

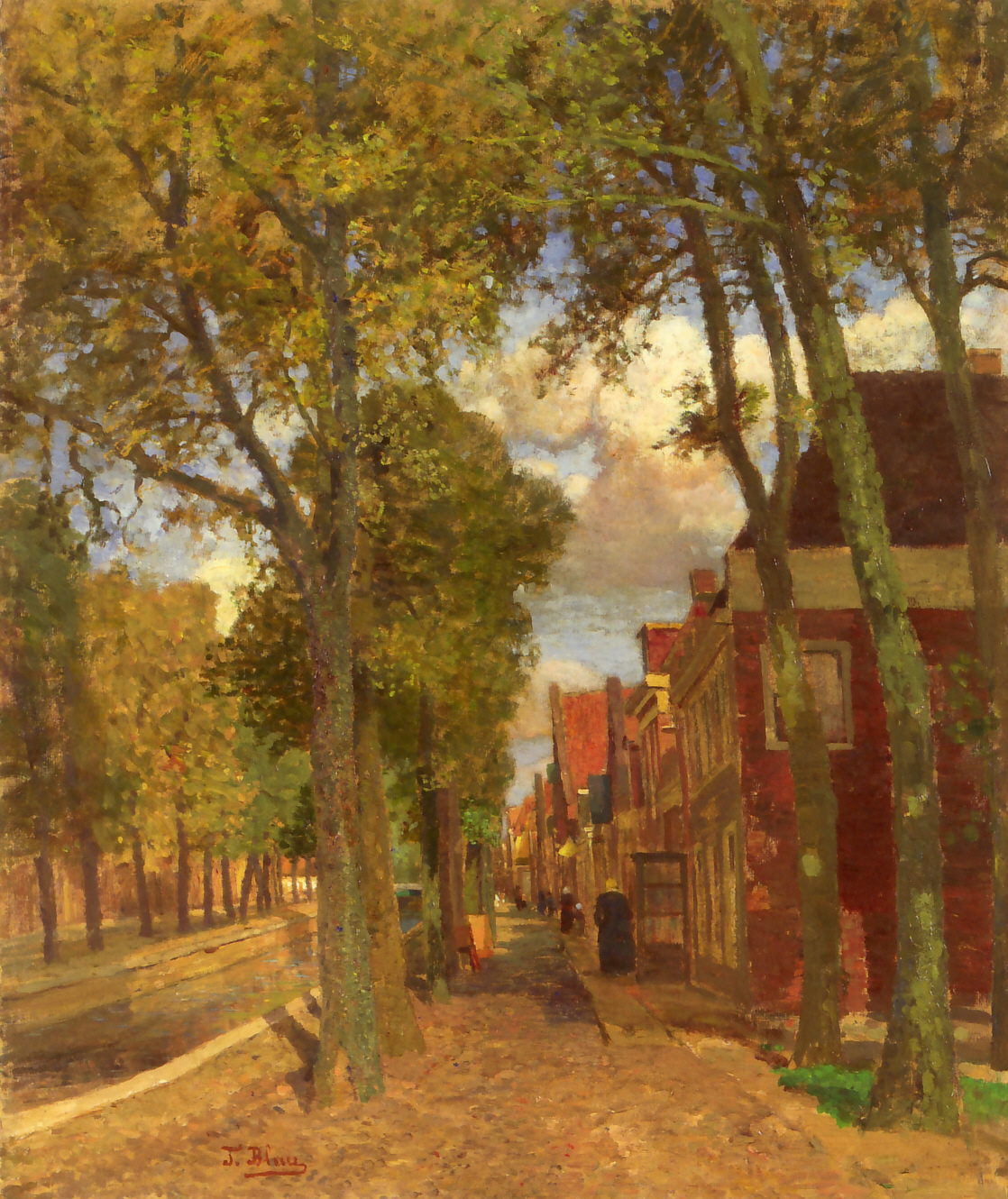
Canal in Friesland (1908)

Tina Blau, later Tina Blau-Lang (15 November 1845 – 31 October 1916) was an Austrian landscape painter.

== Life ==
Blau's father was a doctor in the Austro-Hungarian Medical Corps and was very supportive of her desire to become a painter. She took lessons, successively, with August Schaeffer and Wilhelm Lindenschmit in Munich (1869–1873). She also studied with Emil Jakob Schindler and they shared a studio from 1875 to 1876, but allegedly broke off the engagement after a quarrel. Later, at the art colony in Plankenberg Castle, near Neulengbach, she briefly became his student again.

In 1883, she converted from Judaism to the Evangelical Lutheran Church and married Heinrich Lang, a painter who specialized in horses and battle scenes. They moved to Munich where, from 1889, she taught landscape and still life painting at the Women's Academy of the Münchner Künstlerinnenverein (Munich Women Artists' Association). In 1890, her first major exhibition was held there. Blau exhibited her work at the Palace of Fine Arts at the 1893 World's Columbian Exposition in Chicago, Illinois.

After her husband's death, she spent ten years travelling in Holland and Italy. After her return, she established a studio in the Rotunde. In 1897, together with Olga Prager, Rosa Mayreder and Karl Federn, she helped found the "Wiener Frauenakademie", an art school for women, where she taught until 1915. One of her students was Slovenian painter, teacher and printmaker Avgusta Šantel (1876–1968).

She spent her last summer working in Bad Gastein, then went to a sanatorium in Vienna for a medical examination. She died there of cardiac arrest. She was given an "Ehrengrab" (Honor Grave) in the Zentralfriedhof. The Vienna Künstlerhaus auctioned off her estate and held a major retrospective in 1917.
