= Hugo Darnaut =

Austrian landscape painter (1851–1937)

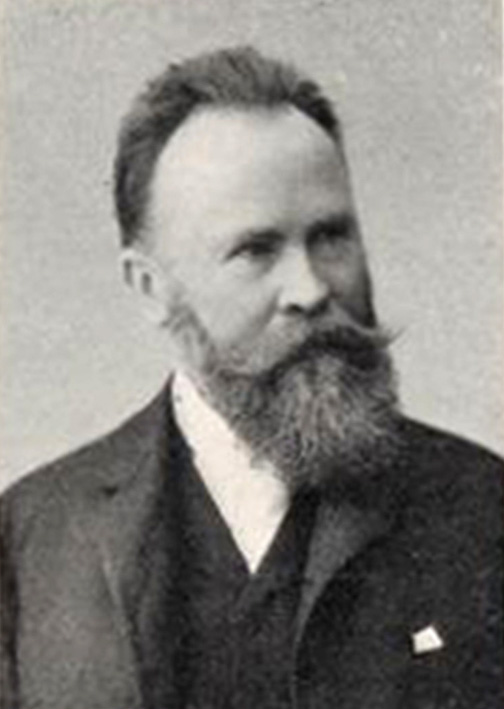
Hugo Darnaut (1904)

Hugo Darnaut, originally Hugo Fix, (28 November 1851 – 9 January 1937) was an Austrian landscape painter.

== Biography ==
He was born on 28 November 1851 in Dessau. His father, Michael Fix, was a court performer who went by the stage name "Darnaut". He was raised in Graz and began by studying decorative art in Vienna with a theater painter named Heinrich Burghart, then enrolled at the Academy of Fine Arts, where he studied with Eduard Peithner von Lichtenfels. Thanks to a scholarship, he was able to go to Düsseldorf, where he studied with the landscape painters Andreas Achenbach, Robert Meyerheim and Johannes Wortmann. He became a member of the Vienna Künstlerhaus in 1877. During the early 1890s, he spent some time with Gustav Schönleber in Karlsruhe.

Following the death of Emil Jakob Schindler, he took over the Schloss Plankenberg in Sieghartskirchen, where Schindler had operated a school of landscape painting. He also organized large-scale exhibitions in Berlin, Paris and Venice, among others. In 1900, he and the architecture painter, Erwin Pendl, created a monumental bird's-eye view of Vienna for the Exposition Universelle. From 1913 to 1918, he was President of the Vienna Cooperative of Fine Artists.

In 1925, he became an honorary member of the TU Wien and, five years later, he was named a Bürger (citizen) of Vienna. He died in Vienna on 9 January 1937

== Selected paintings ==
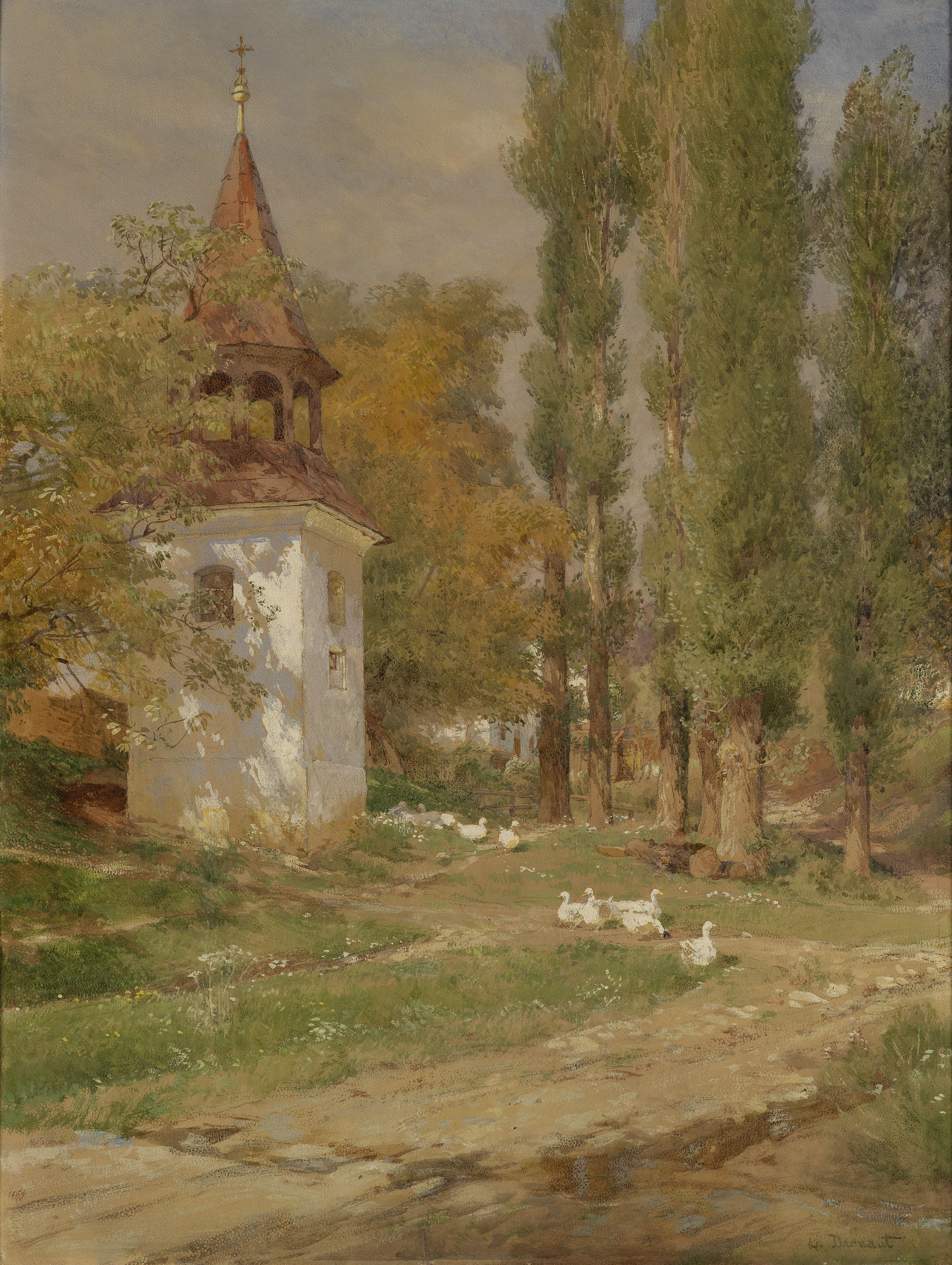
Moravian Village Scene

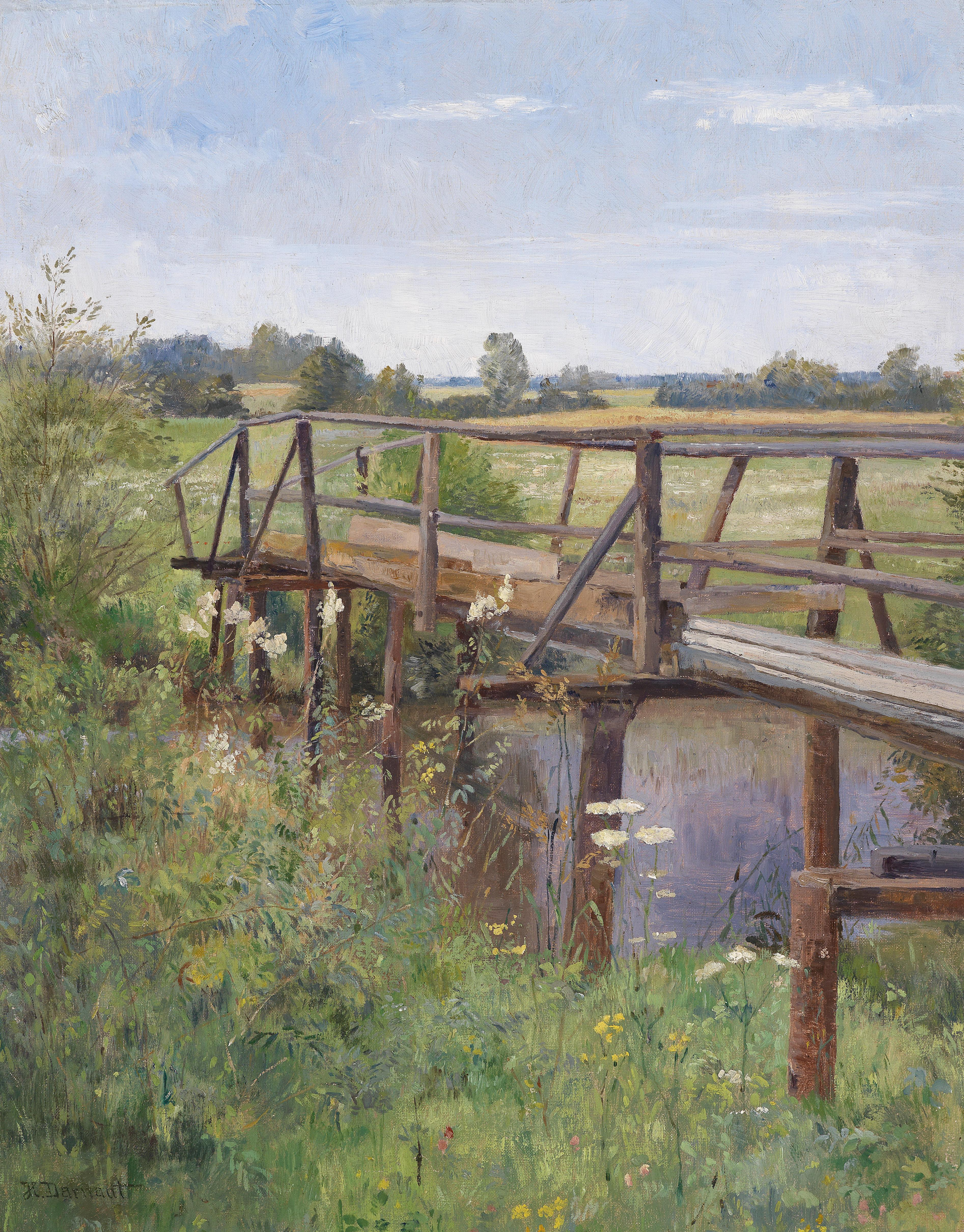
Summer Landscape
with Bridge

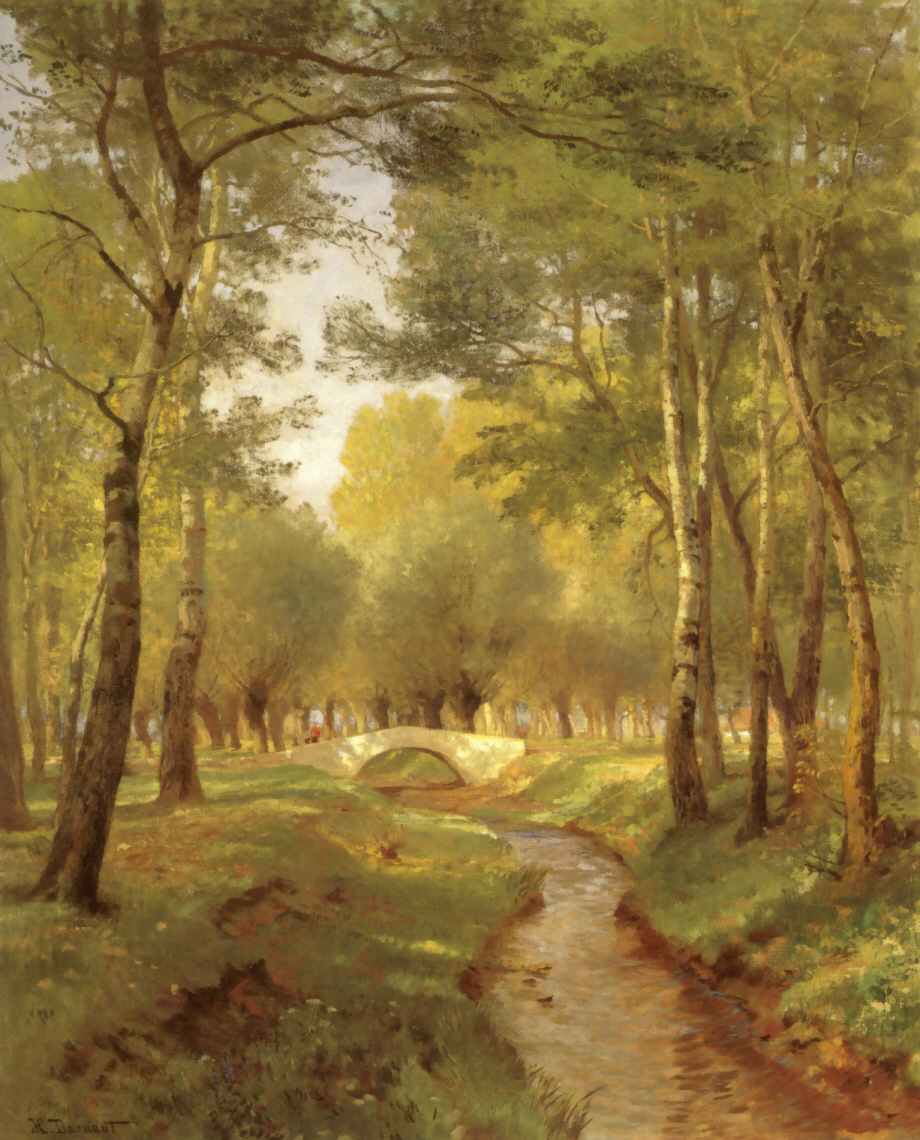
Forest Stream
with Bridge

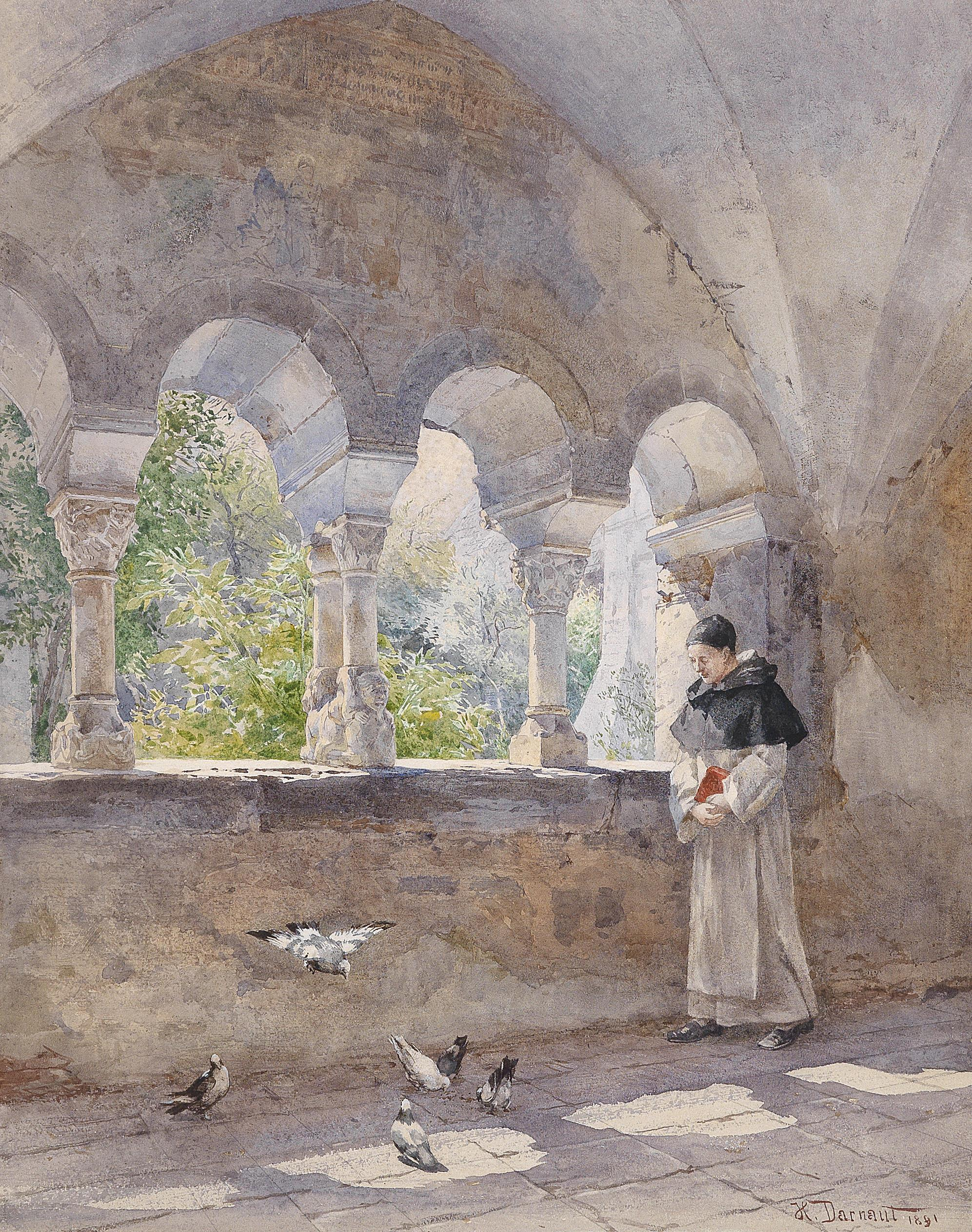
Cloister at the Cistercian Abbey in Millstatt
