= Hermann von Königsbrunn =

Austrian painter (1823–1907)

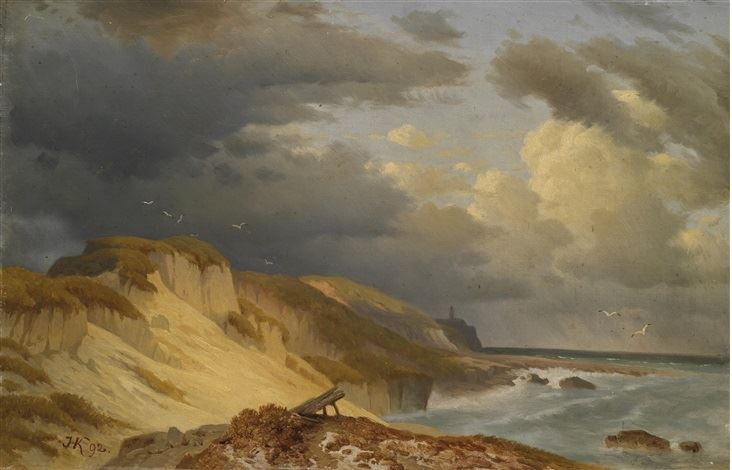
On the Coast

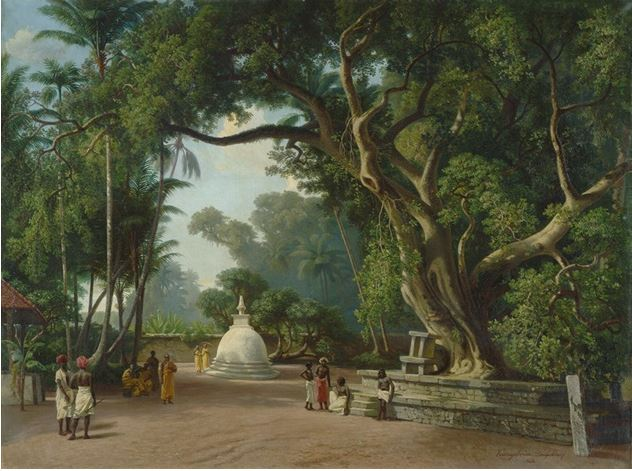
Monks Under a Bodhi Tree in Ceylon

Hermann Freiherr von Königsbrunn (1 March 1823 – 16 February 1907) was an Austrian landscape painter.

== Biography ==
He was born on 1 March 1823 in Bad Radkersburg. His family had been elevated to the nobility in 1685 and obtained rights to the title of Freiherr in 1716. He studied in Graz, where he frequented the studios of the landscape painter and author, Josef Kuwasseg, and developed an interest in art. After that, he attended Theresian Academy in Vienna. In 1845, he graduated from there and found his first employment; as a civil servant.

In 1848, he decided to pursue a career as a painter and studied with Leopold Rottmann, a lecturer at the Academy of Fine Arts, Munich. In addition to his lessons, he copied landscapes created by one of the other Professors there, Eduard Schleich.

After returning home for a short time, he went to Salzburg in 1850 and worked with the landscape painter, Johann Fischbach. In 1851, he became a travel companion to Franz Ritter von Friedau (1826–1888), heir to an industrial fortune, and the zoologist Ludwig Karl Schmarda. Together, they embarked on an expedition to Greece, Egypt and Ceylon.

In 1865, he applied for a position at the Graz University of Technology. Although he received a majority vote from the board, Heinrich Bank, a history painter, was chosen instead. Three years later, he obtained a position as a Professor at the Styrian Provincial Art School, where he taught until 1892 and was one of the school's most popular teachers. Among his notable students there were Marie Egner, Ernestine von Kirchsberg, Anton Marussig and Alfred Zoff.

He died in Graz on 16 February 1907.

== Sources ==
- Biography; from the Biographisches Lexikon des Kaiserthums Oesterreich @ WikiSource
- Gothaisches Genealogisches Taschenbuch der Freiherrlichen Häuser, Gotha, Justus Perthes, 1903, pp. 382–383.
- Heinrich Fuchs, Die österreichischen Maler des 19. Jahrhunderts, Vol. 2, self-published, Vienna, 1973,
- 125 Jahre Steiermärkischer Kunstverein Werkbund, (exhibition catalog), Kulturreferat der Landeshauptstadt Graz, Stadtmuseum, Graz 1990, ISBN 3-900764-123.
