= Bertha Müller =

Austrian painter (1848–1937)

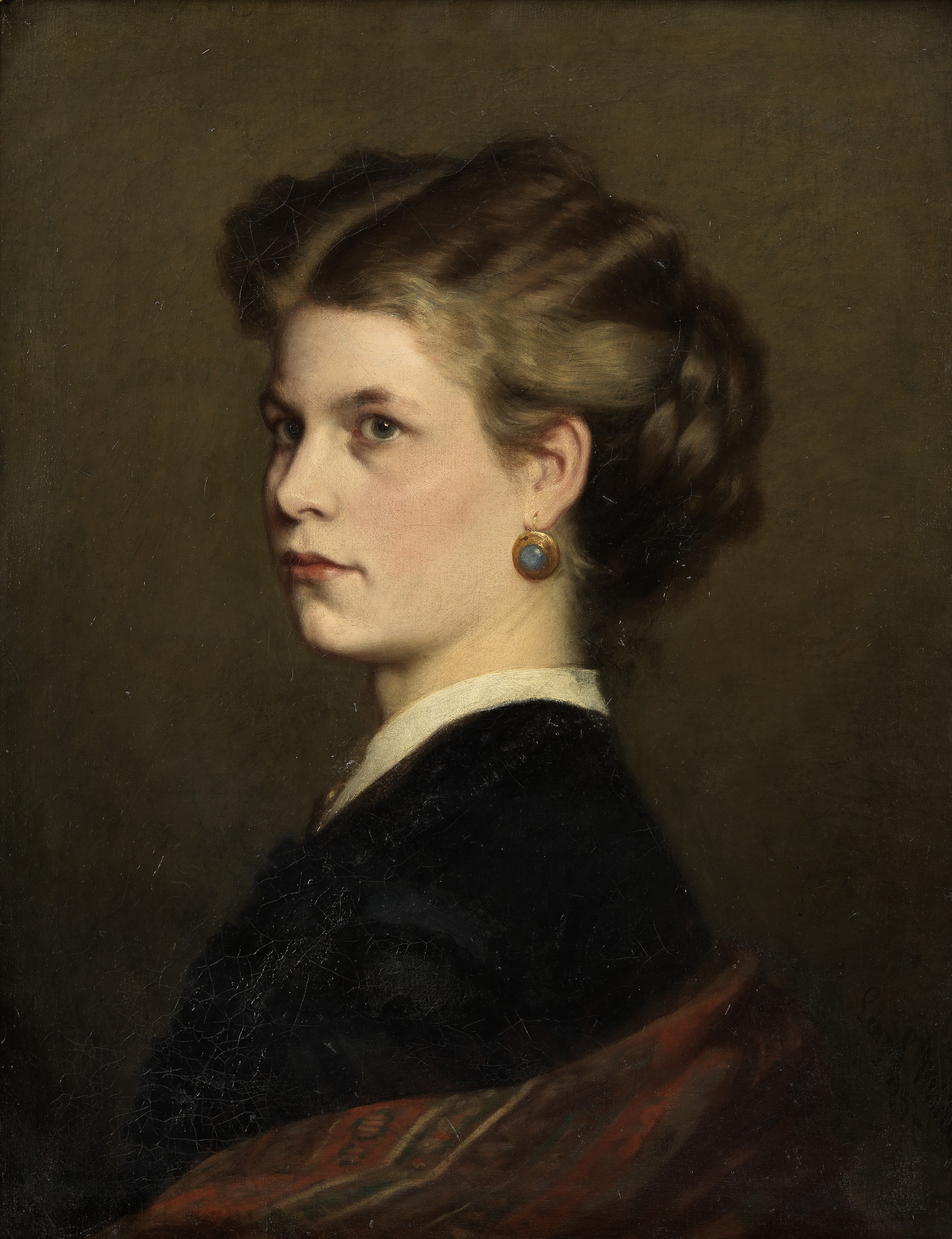
Bertha Müller; by her brother Leopold Carl Müller (1870s)

Bertha Mathilde Müller (28 October 1848 – 26 January 1937) was an Austrian portrait painter.

== Biography ==
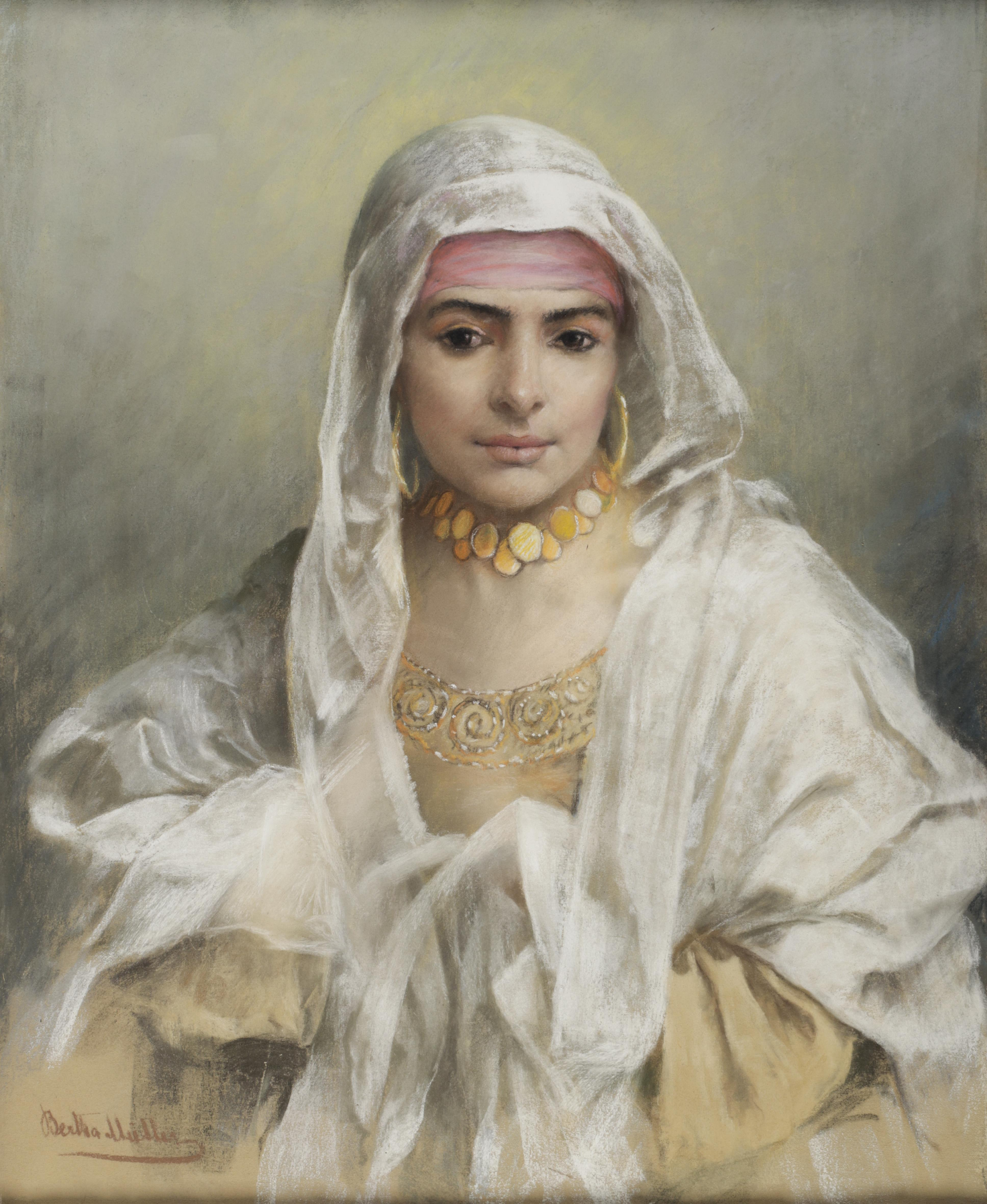
Portrait of an Oriental Woman, pastel on canvas

She was born in Vienna. Her father, Leopold Müller (1807–1862), was a surveyor who later became a lithographer. Her mother, Josefa née Bichler, was the daughter of a master furrier. She had nine siblings, four of whom died as children. Her brother, Leopold Carl, and sister Marie also became painters. Her sister, Josefine (1839–1906), married the painter Eduard Swoboda.

After her father's death, Leopold took care of his younger siblings, until the family's financial situation improved, around 1870. From 1877 to 1879, she attended the preparatory school at the Kunstgewerbeschule (now the University of Applied Arts).

For ten years, from 1880, she and Marie worked in their brother Leopold's studio at the Academy of Fine Arts; taking additional lessons from him. There, they met August von Pettenkofen, who became a sort of mentor. He died in 1889, and left his studio to them in his will. They worked there until 1902, when they were evicted, then opened their own studio.

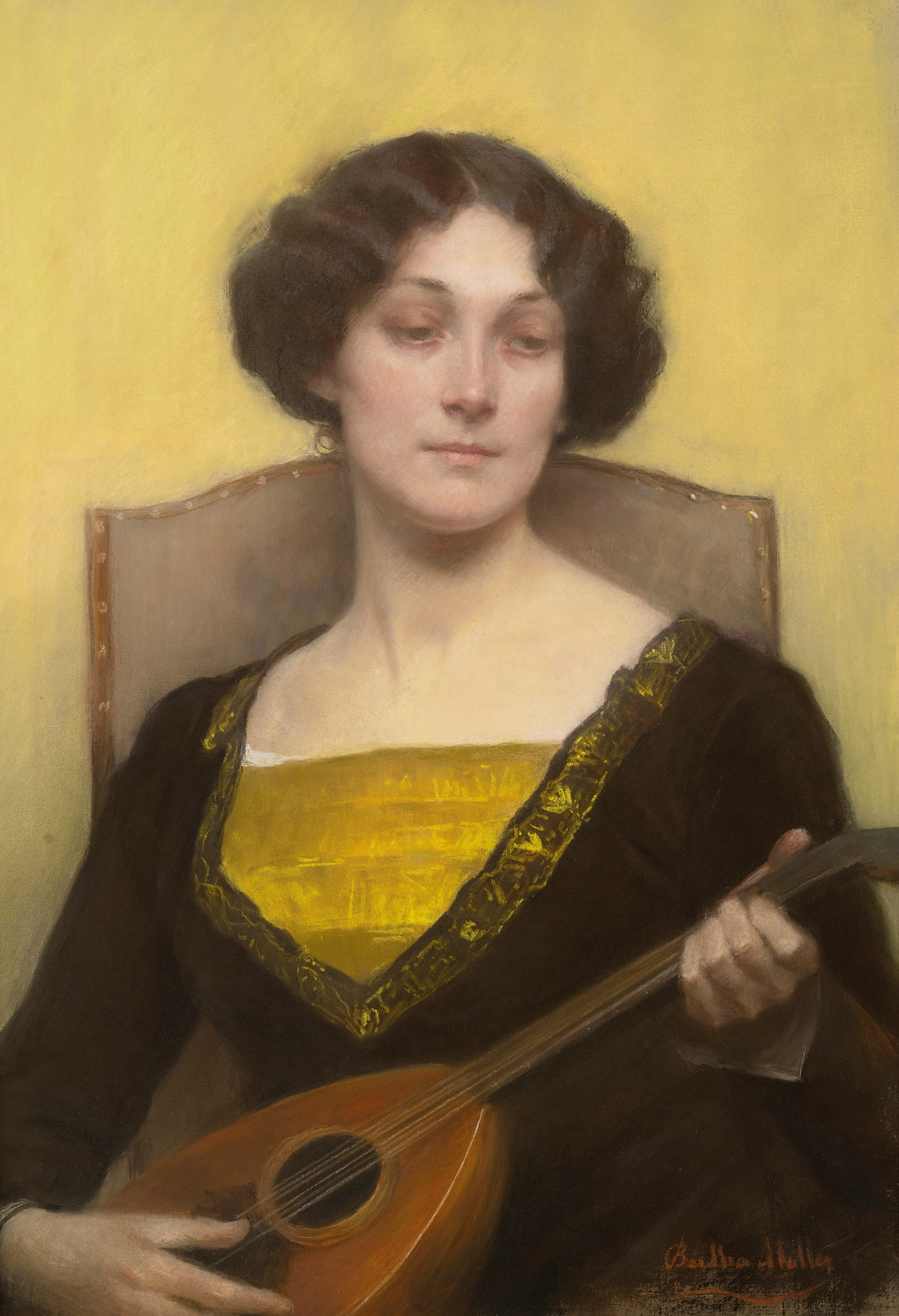
Emilie Louise Flöge Playing the Mandolin, pastel on canvas

She also worked in Stuttgart, and was a member of the Württembergischer Malerinnenverein (Women artists' association), from 1903 to 1907. She never became as well known as her sister, and exhibited little, although she participated in a showing in the rotunda of The Woman's Building at the 1893 World's Columbian Exposition in Chicago.

In addition to her original portraits, she made several copies on behalf of Kaiser Wilhelm II, including one of his grandmother, Queen Victoria (original by Heinrich von Angeli), which is now in the National Portrait Gallery, London.

Müller died in Vienna in 1937.
