= Heinrich Lang (painter) =

German painter, illustrator, and author

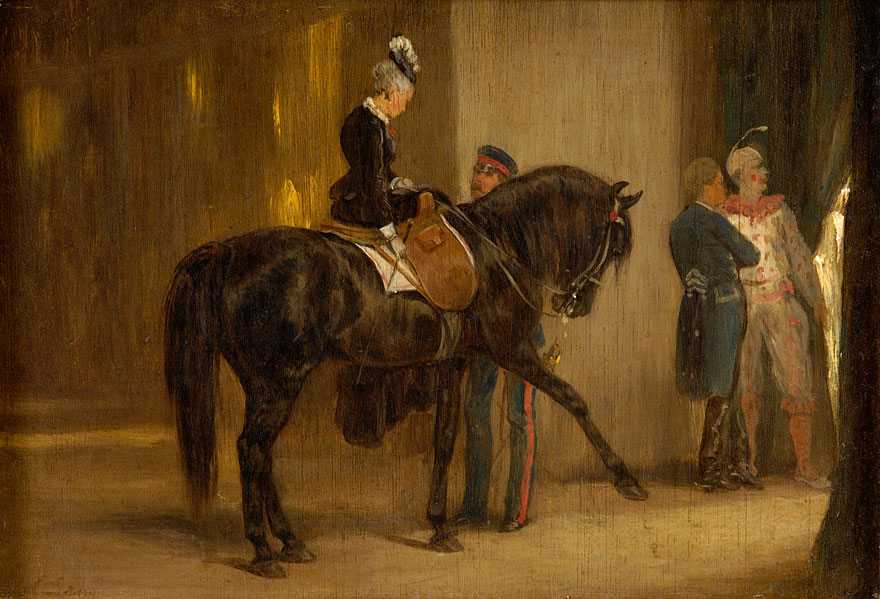
Waiting for Their Entrance

Heinrich Lang (24 April 1838 in Regensburg – 8 July 1891 in Munich) was a German horse and battle painter, illustrator and author.

== Biography ==
He developed an interest in painting from visiting the studios of Carl Steffeck, during a stay in Berlin when he was seventeen. Between 1855 and 1857, he studied with Friedrich Voltz and Franz Adam at the Academy of Fine Arts, Munich. He conducted anatomical studies of horses at the Veterinary School of the Ludwig-Maximilians-Universität München as well as at the local stud farms of the Princes of Thurn and Taxis in Regensburg and Württemberg, where he had learned to ride as a boy. He served a brief stint in the artillery in 1859.

He undertook several trips to Hungary throughout the 1860s, painting scenes from the puszta. In 1866 and 1868, he exhibited at the Salon in Paris. While there, he worked with Adolf Schreyer. In 1870 and 1871, during the Franco-Prussian War, he worked as a battle painter. After that, he developed an interest in circus performers.

His first wife, Antonie (née Meggendorfer) died in 1877. He married the landscape painter, Tina Blau, in 1883 and spent his later years as an illustrator and writer in Munich. His death was due to a combination of influenza and tuberculosis, which had been undiagnosed before he became ill.

== Sources ==
- Hyacinth Holland (1906). "Lang, Heinrich" . Allgemeine Deutsche Biographie (in German). Vol. 51. Leipzig: Duncker & Humblot. pp. 547–553.
- Eva Knels: "Lang, Heinrich" In: Bénédicte Savoy, France Nerlich (Eds.): Pariser Lehrjahre. Ein Lexikon zur Ausbildung deutscher Maler in der französischen Hauptstadt. Vol. 2: 1844–1870. de Gruyter, Berlin/Boston 2015 ISBN 978-3-11-031477-9
