= Marie Arnsburg =

Austrian painter (1853-1940)

- Born: January 3, 1853; Vienna, Austria
- Died: May 30, 1940 (aged 87); Vienna, Austria

Marie Arnsburg (1853-1940) was an Austrian artist known for her impressionistic paintings.

Arnsburg was born on January 3, 1853 in Vienna, Austria. She was a member of the Verein der Schriftstellerinnen und Künstlerinnen Wien (Association of Women Writers and Artists Vienna) from 1900 through 1906.

Arnsburg died on May 30, 1940 in Vienna, Austria.

== Gallery ==
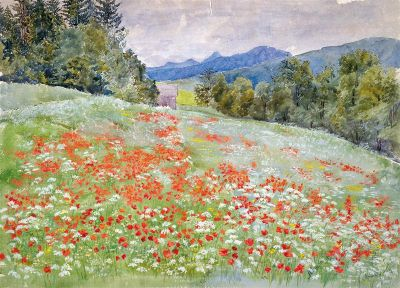
Poppy and Hemlock Meadow, Schladming

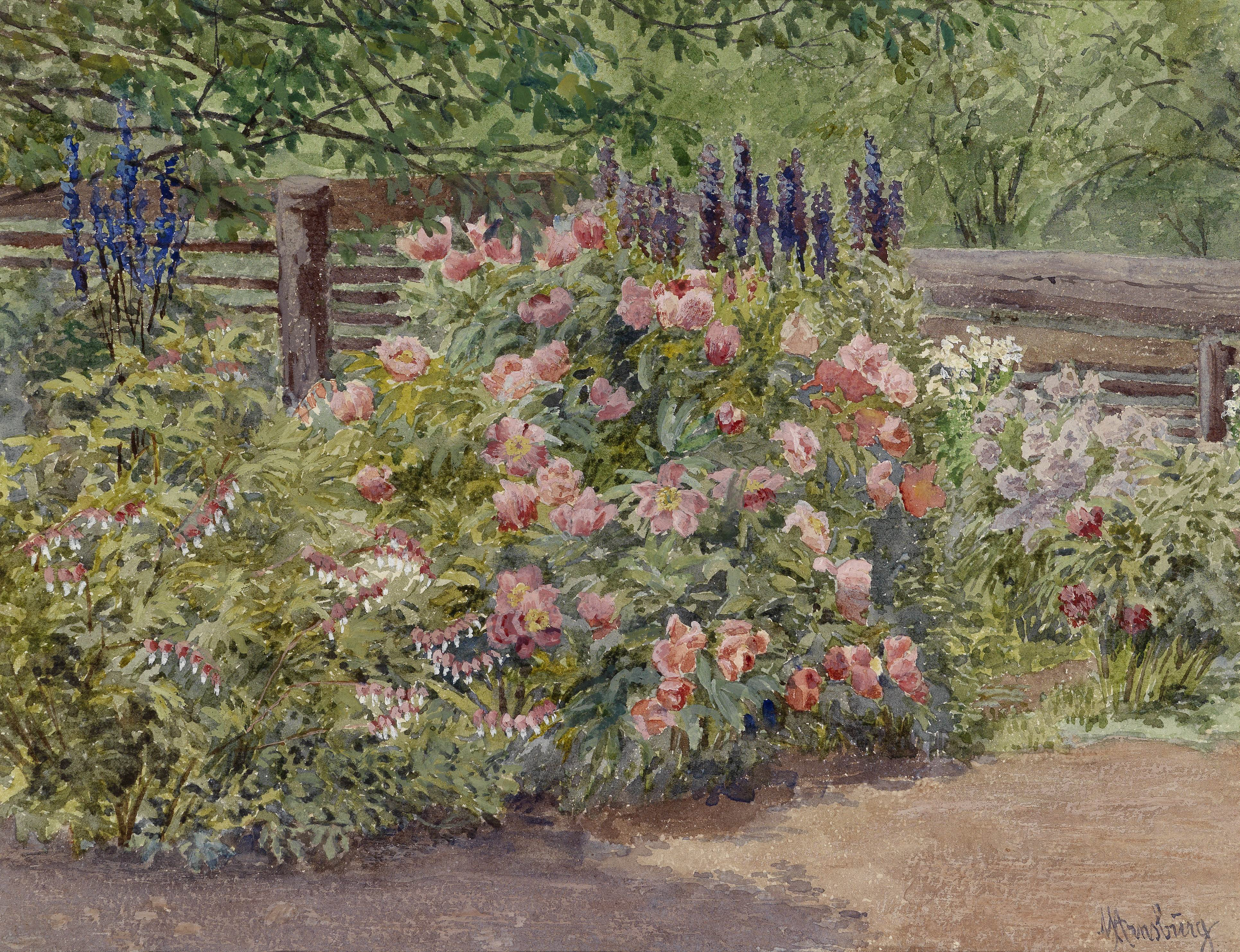
Peonies
