= Marie Egner =

Austrian painter (1850–1940)

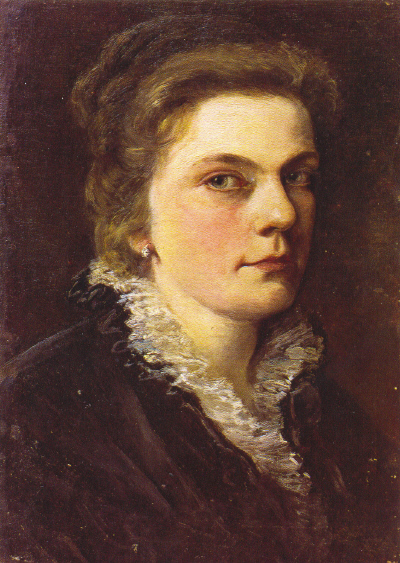
- Self-portrait (1878)
- Born: 25 August 1850; Bad Radkersburg, Austria
- Died: 31 March 1940 (aged 89); Vienna, Austria
- Known for: Painting
- Website: marieegner.at

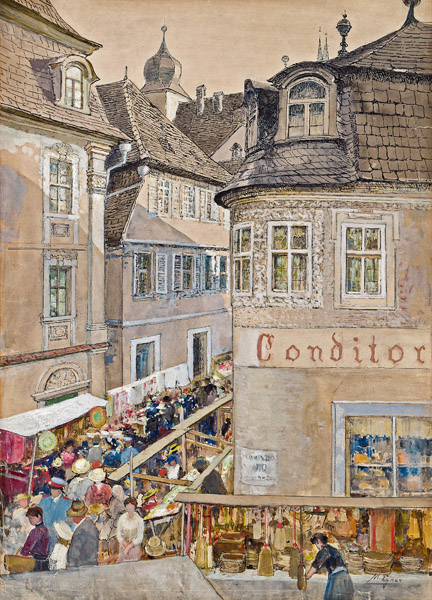
Weekly Market in Marktbreit (date unknown)

Marie Egner (25 August 1850, Bad Radkersburg - 31 March 1940, Vienna) was an Austrian painter.

== Life ==
Egner was born on 25 August 1850 in Bad Radkersburg, Austria. She took her first drawing lessons in Graz with Hermann von Königsbrunn, then went to Düsseldorf from 1872 to 1875, where she studied with Carl Jungheim. In 1882, she went to Vienna to live with her mother, but spent her summers at the art colony in Plankenberg Castle, near Neulengbach, where she took lessons with Emil Jakob Schindler until 1887. A study trip to England followed from 1887 to 1889. Shortly after, her first exhibition was held at the Vienna Künstlerhaus. She also exhibited in Germany and England.

Egner exhibited her work at The Woman's Building at the 1893 World's Columbian Exposition in Chicago, Illinois. Along with Tina Blau and Olga Wisinger-Florian she was part of the Austrian "Stimmungsimpressionismus. Egner established an art school for women, but had to give it up in 1910, for health reasons. After World War I, she became a member of the Austrian Association of Women Artists (VBKÖ). In 1926, the group held a major retrospective exhibition of her work. After 1930, she began to lose her eyesight and withdrew from public life.

She died on 31 March 1940 in Vienna.

== Legacy ==
Her work was included in the 2019 exhibition City Of Women: Female artists in Vienna from 1900 to 1938 at the Österreichische Galerie Belvedere.
