= Marianne von Eschenburg =

Austrian painter (1856–1937)

- Born: 18 April 1856; Vienna, Austria
- Died: 28 October 1937 (aged 81); Vienna, Austria
- Known for: Painting

Marianne von Eschenburg (1856–1937) was an Austrian painter. She was known for her portrait paintings.

== Biography ==
von Eschenburg was born on 18 April 1856 in Vienna, Austria. She was a student of her uncle, Karl von Blaas. She studied in Paris with Carolus-Duran, Henri-Jean Guillaume Martin, and Elisa Koch.

She exhibited at the Salzburger Kunstverein and the Vienna Künstlerhaus. She was a founding member of Acht Künstlerinnen (Group of the Eight Artists) in Vienna.

von Eschenburg exhibited her work at The Woman's Building at the 1893 World's Columbian Exposition in Chicago, Illinois.

She died on 28 October 1937 in Vienna, Austria.

== Gallery ==
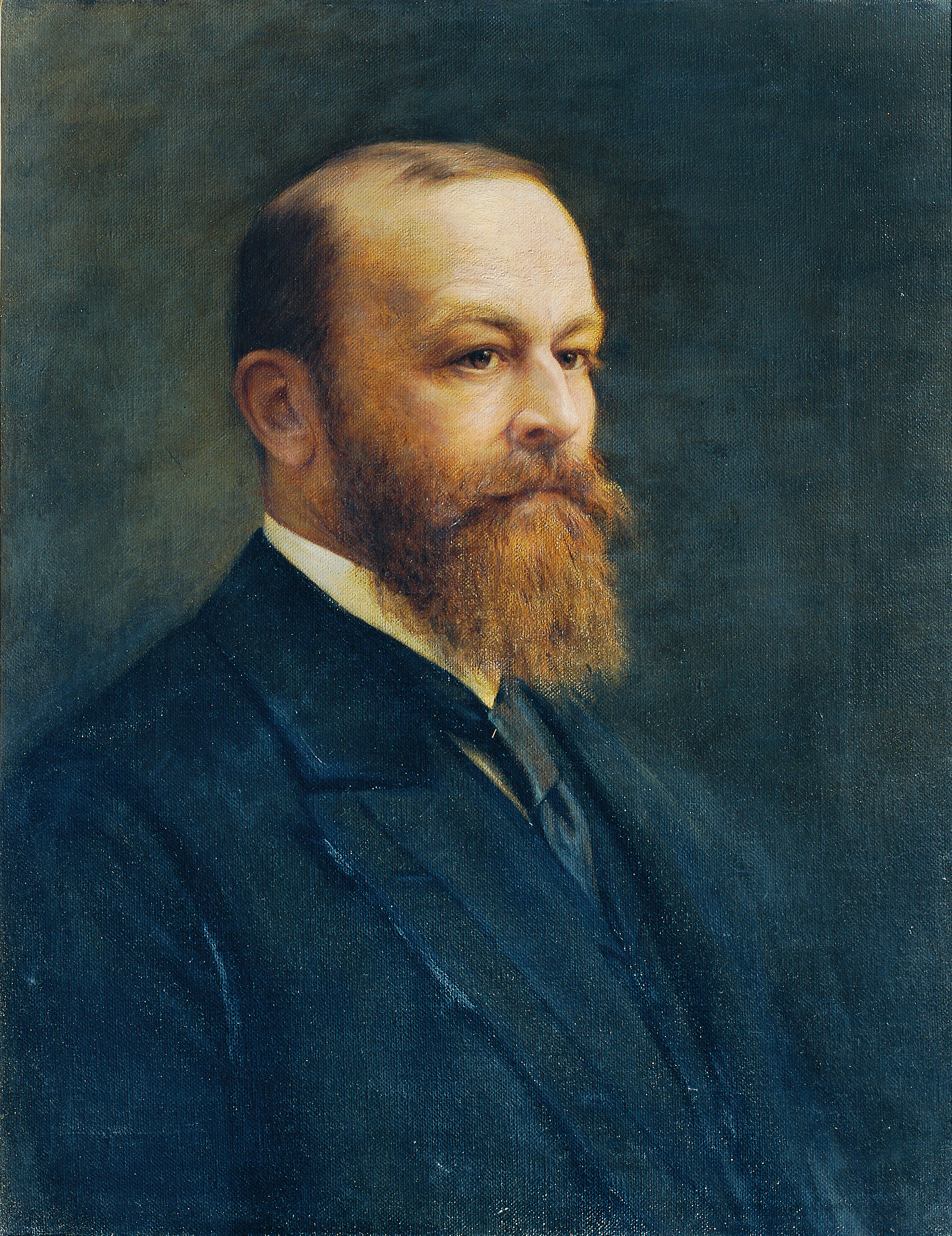
Portrait of Professor Alexander Kolisko

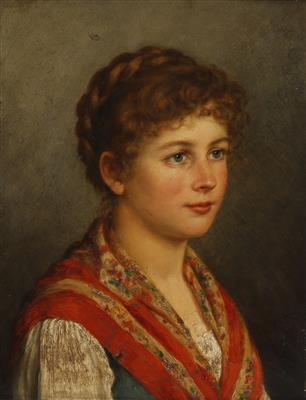
Portrait of a Girl (1890)

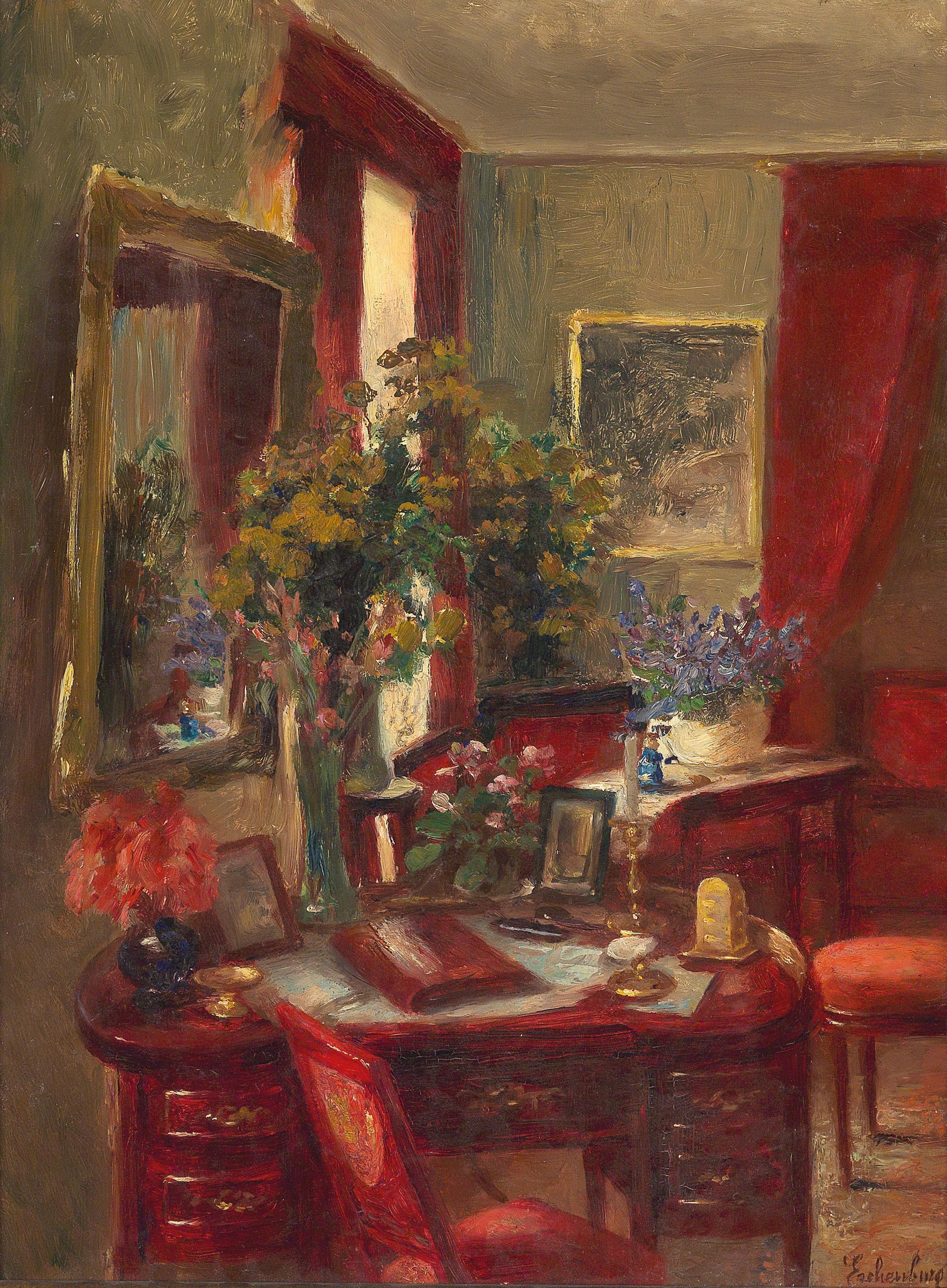
Atelier of the painter
Olga Wisinger-Florian

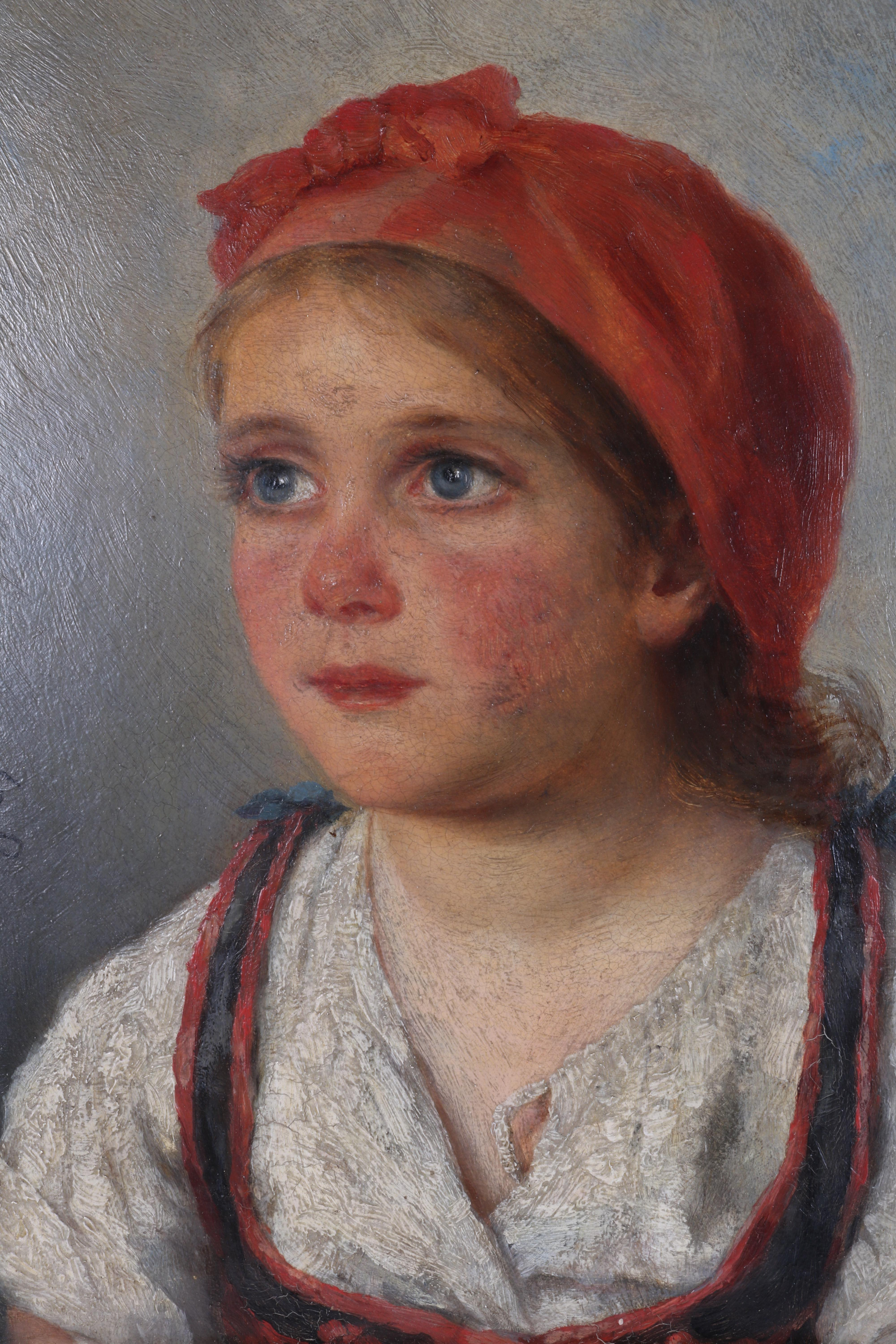
Young Girl with Red Headscarf
