= August Schaeffer =

Austrian painter (1833–1916)

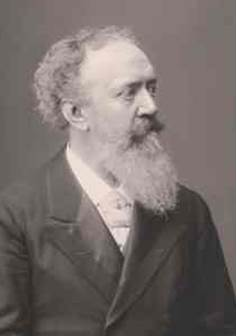
August Schaeffer (date unknown)

August Schaeffer von Wienwald (30 April 1833 – 29 November 1916) was an Austrian landscape painter and Director of the Kunsthistorisches Museum.

== Biography ==
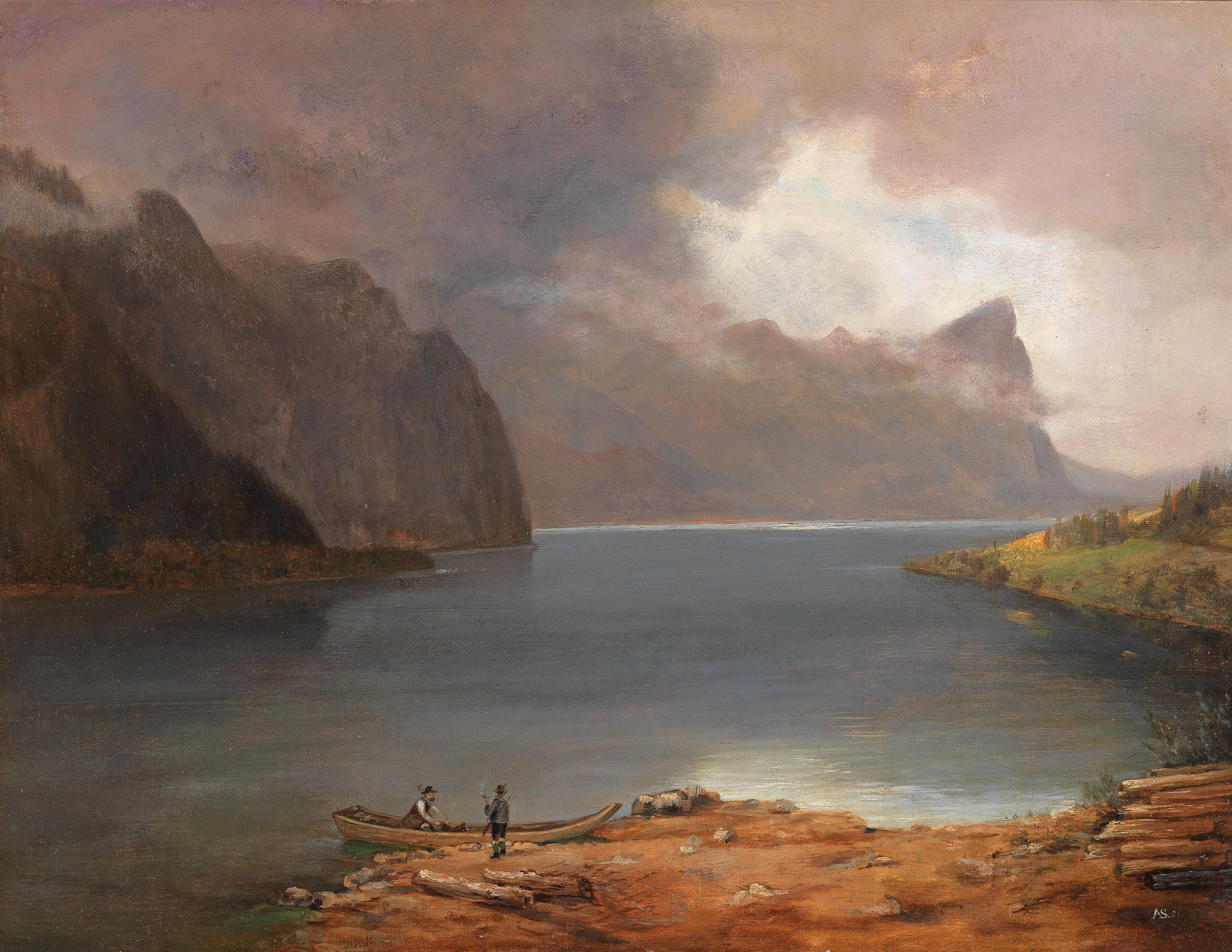
View of Mondsee

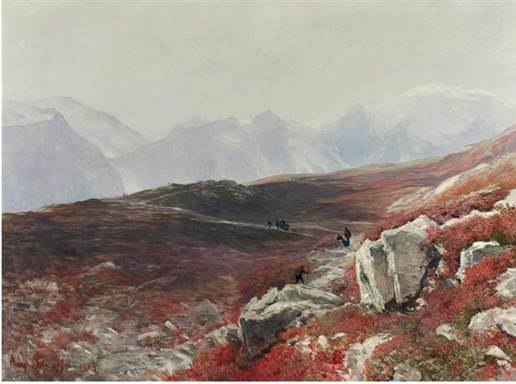
Blooming Alpenroses with Hikers

He was born on 30 April 1833 in Vienna. His father was a surgeon. Two of his sisters would marry painters; Ludwig Halauska, also a landscape painter, and Karl Borromäus Post, an animal painter.

From 1852 to 1856, he studied at the Academy of Fine Arts with the landscape painter, Franz Steinfeld. After graduating, he undertook numerous study trips throughout southern and western Europe, notably to the North Sea, Hungary and the Alps. From 1871 to 1874, he was a secretary at the Academy's library, then served as Curator of their gallery from 1874 to 1880.

He then moved to the Kunsthistorisches Museum; beginning as Curator from 1881 to 1891, then becoming the museum's second Director, from 1892 to 1910, succeeding Eduard von Engerth. During his tenure, he worked to create a scientific foundation for the museum and pursued a conservative course for acquisitions.

After 1861, he was also an active member of the Vienna Künstlerhaus, serving on the executive committee from 1884 to 1886. He wrote a history of the organization: 50 Jahre Genossenschaft der bildenden Künstler Künstlerhaus that was published in 1913. He was elevated to the aristocracy in 1912, becoming "August Schaeffer Edler von Wienwald". Shortly before his death, he was named a Hofrat (Court Counselor). He died on 29 November 1916 in Vienna.

He was married twice. His first wife was the opera singer, Emilie Hoffmann (1835–1889). In 1905, he married the painter and writer, Auguste Wahrmund (1862-1936), daughter of the orientalist scholar, Adolf Wahrmund.
