= Teresa Feoderovna Ries =

Austrian sculptor and painter

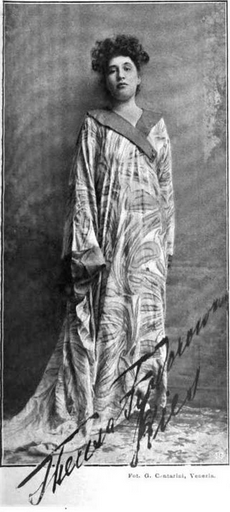
Teresa Feodorovna Ries, from a 1906 publication.

Teresa Feoderovna Ries (30 January 1866, Budapest – 16 July 1956, Lugano) was a Hungarian-born Austrian sculptor and painter. The year of her birth has also been given as 1866 and 1877.

== Life and work ==
Teresa Ries was born in Hungary to a Jewish family. She attended the Moscow School of Painting, Sculpture and Architecture. She was expelled for showing disrespect toward a professor in one of her classes. She moved to Vienna at the age of 21, where her first exhibition at the Vienna Künstlerhaus included Witch, a sculpture of a nude woman clipping her toenails. This piece caught the attention of Kaiser Franz Joseph I, and she soon became highly celebrated throughout Vienna. The exhibition was also attended by Gustav Klimt, an active member of the Vienna Secession movement, who asked her to exhibit with them. She sought out Edmund Hellmer as a mentor; at first he refused, saying that "it was pointless to teach women since they married anyway". Hellmer eventually relented and helped her to exhibit her work and to gain commissions.

In 1900 Ries exhibited at the Paris World's Fair and the 1911 World's Fair in Turin on the invitation of both Russia and Austria. Prince Aloys of Liechtenstein offered her the use of a suite of rooms beside his own picture gallery as a studio.

Working in stone, marble, plaster, and bronze, Ries produced both private and public works during her career. Some of her well-known nude sculptures are Sleepwaker (pre-1894), Lucifer (c. 1897), and Death (1898). She produced sculptures and busts for public spaces; her Bust of Jaromir Mundy (1897) is mounted on the outside of the Vienna Fireman's Association building. She is perhaps best known for photographing and creating a bust of Mark Twain during the time he resided in Vienna.

According to art critic Karl Kraus, "her exhibitions received too much publicity". Ries published her memoir, Die Sprache des Steines (The Language of Stone) in 1928. In 1938 she was evicted from her gallery and studio space due to the Nazi policy of Aryanization. She continued to work in Vienna until 1942 and then immigrated to Lugano, Switzerland.

== Personal life ==
Ries married, lost a child, and divorced while still a teenager in Moscow.

== Legacy ==
Her work was included in the 2019 exhibition City Of Women: Female artists in Vienna from 1900 to 1938 at the Österreichische Galerie Belvedere.

== Sources ==
- Johnson, Julie M. (2012). The Memory Factory: The Forgotten Women Artists of Vienna 1900. Purdue University Press. ISBN 978-1-55753-613-6.
- Anka Leśniak: Teresa Feodorowna Ries and The Witch. Art and Documentation, 21, 2019, pp. 143–158
