= Eduard Peithner von Lichtenfels =

Austrian painter (1833–1913)

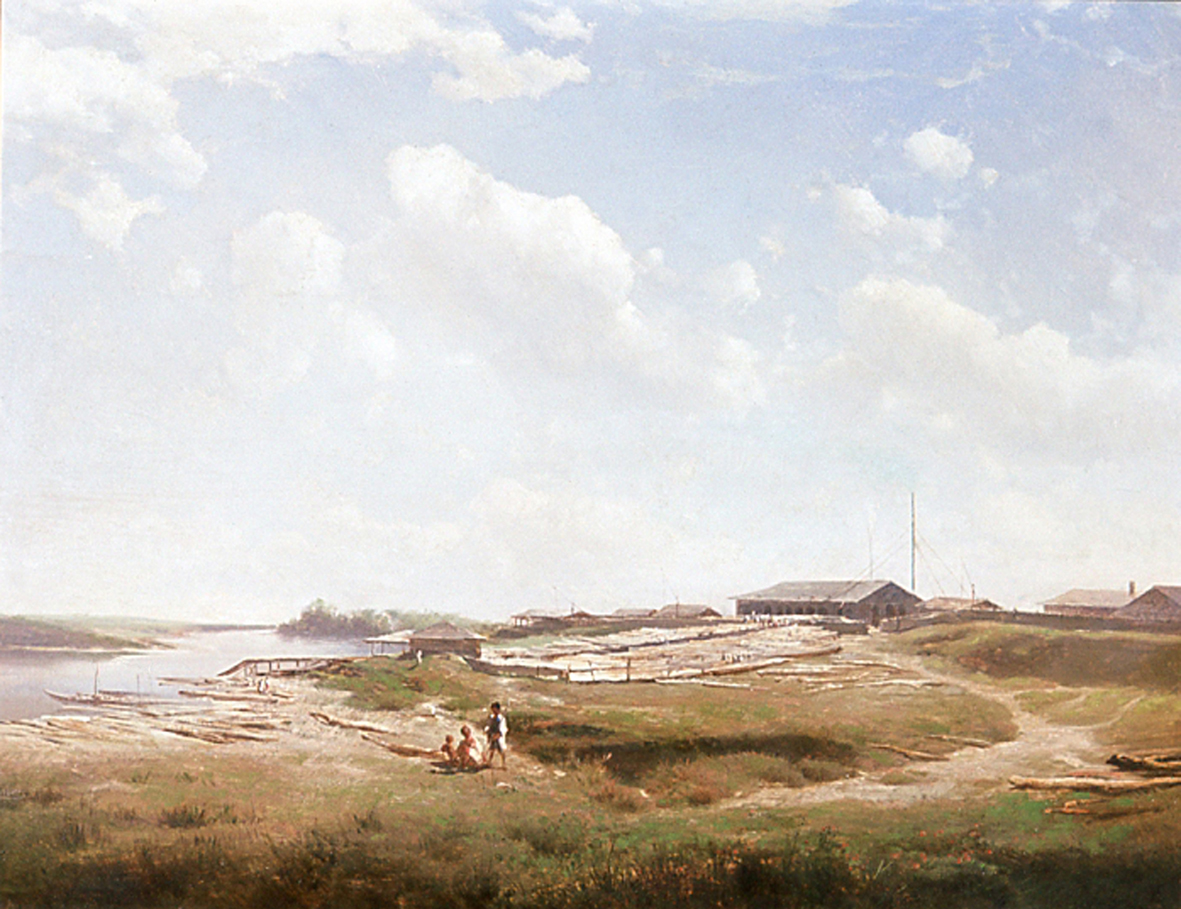
View of the Donau with Lumberyard (c. 1860), Universalmuseum Joanneum

Eduard Peithner von Lichtenfels (18 November 1833 in Vienna – 22 January 1913 in Berlin) was an Austrian landscape painter. He studied at the Academy of Fine Arts, Vienna, under Franz Steinfeld and Thomas Ender. He taught landscape painting at the Academy from 1872 to 1901; his students included Alfred Roller.
