= Olga Wisinger-Florian =

Austrian painter (1844-1926)

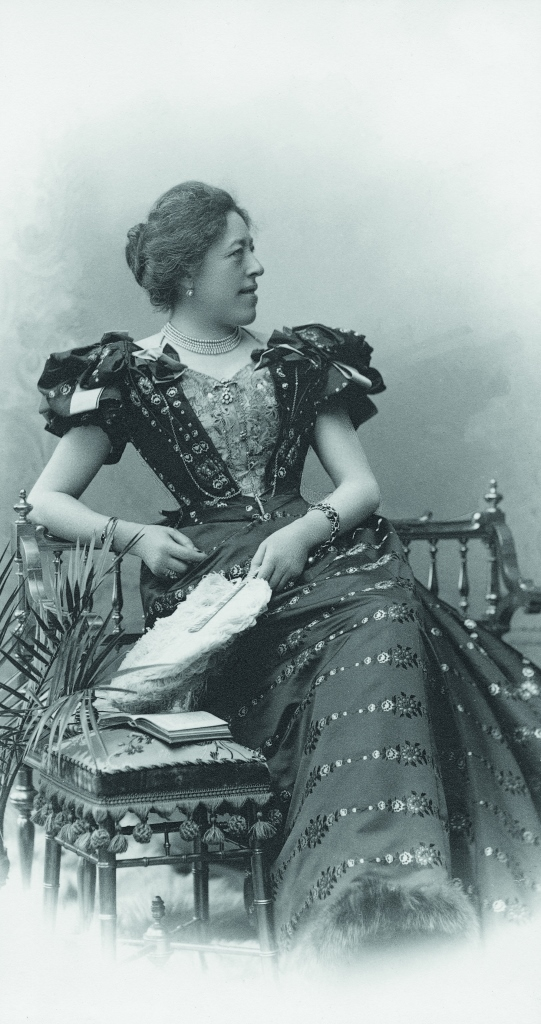
- Olga Wisinger-Florian, circa 1890
- Born: 1 November 1844; Vienna, Austria
- Died: 27 February 1926 (aged 81); Grafenegg, Austria
- Known for: Painting
- Movement: Impressionism

Olga Wisinger-Florian (1 November 1844 – 27 February 1926) was an Austrian impressionist painter, mainly of landscapes and flower still life. She was a representative of the Austrian "Stimmungsimpressionismus" (Mood Impressionism), a loose group of Austrian impressionist painters that was considered avant-garde in the 1870s and 1880s.

== Life ==
Wisinger-Florian was born and lived all her life in Vienna. She began private art lessons at age 19. Frustrated with her progress and the quality of the instruction, she followed her parents' wishes and trained as a concert pianist with Julius Epstein. From 1868 to 1873 she had some success as a pianist, until a hand injury forced her retirement from the piano.

At age 30, Wisinger-Florian returned to painting, and devoted herself wholly to its study. She studied first with August Schaeffer and then with Emil Jakob Schindler. When she was 35 she was included in an exhibition of the Viennese Art Association. She was one of only nine women asked to contribute to Die österreichisch-Ungarische Monarchie, a 24-part encyclopedia of the lands and peoples of the Austro-Hungarian empire—of the other women included, Wisinger-Florian was the lone Austrian.

From 1881 she regularly showed paintings at the annual exhibitions mounted at the artist's house and later often showed at Vienna Secession exhibitions. The work she showed at the Paris and Chicago international exhibitions earned her worldwide acclaim. Wisinger-Florian exhibited her work at the Palace of Fine Arts and The Woman's Building at the 1893 World's Columbian Exposition in Chicago, Illinois. The artist, who was also active in the middle-class women's movements of the time, was awarded numerous distinctions and prizes. Wisinger-Florian's early paintings can be assigned to what is known as Austrian Mood Impressionism. In her landscape paintings she adopted Schindler's sublime approach to nature. The motifs she employed, such as views of tree-lined avenues, gardens and fields, were strongly reminiscent of her teacher's work. After breaking with Schindler in 1884, however, the artist went her own way. Her conception of landscapes became more realistic. Her late work is notable for a lurid palette, with discernible overtones of Expressionism. With landscape and flower pictures that were already Expressionist in palette by the 1890s, she was years ahead of her time.

Despite her late start as a painter, Wisinger-Florian enjoyed renown in fin de siècle Vienna. Her work was included in the 2019 exhibition City Of Women: Female artists in Vienna from 1900 to 1938 at the Österreichische Galerie Belvedere.

== Selected paintings ==
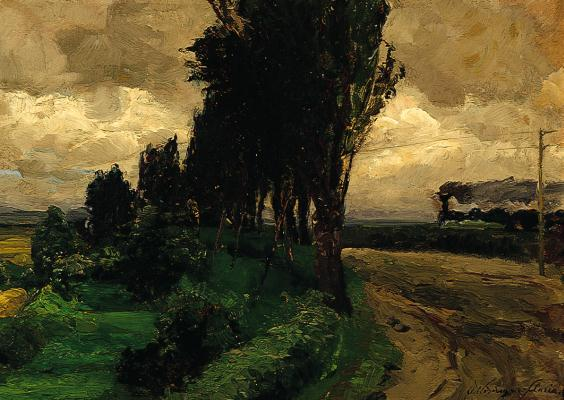
Landscape

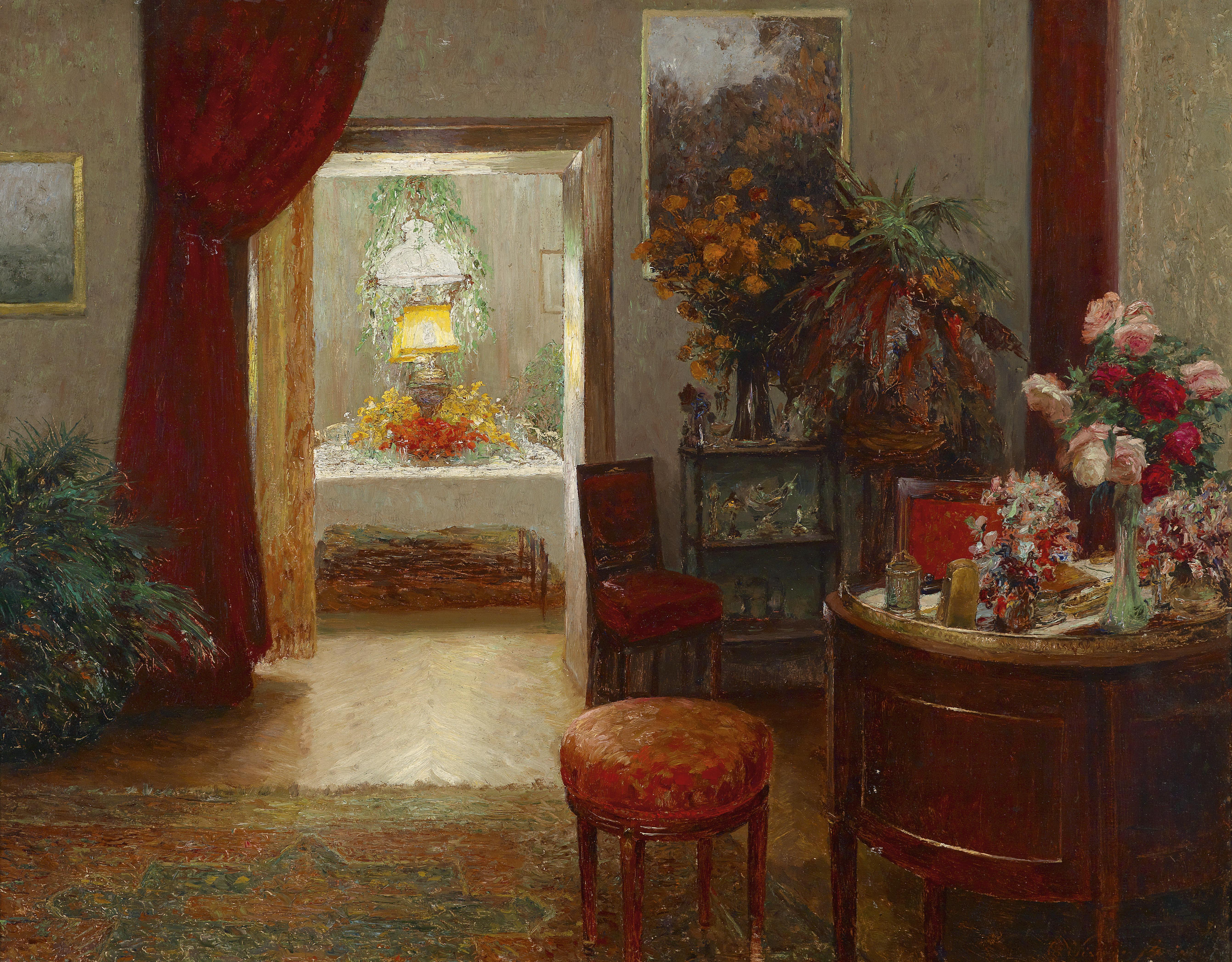
Interior with Decorated Table

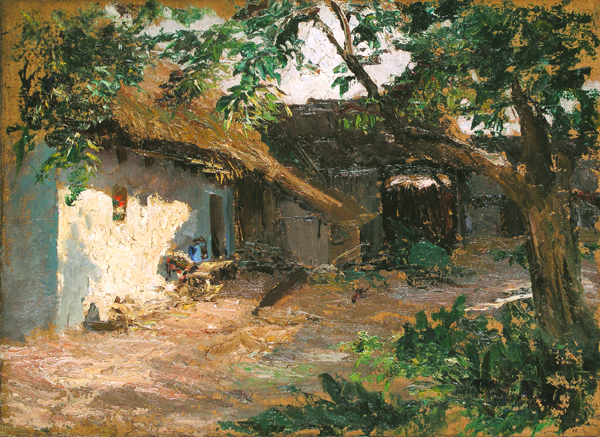
Farmhouse in Etzdorf

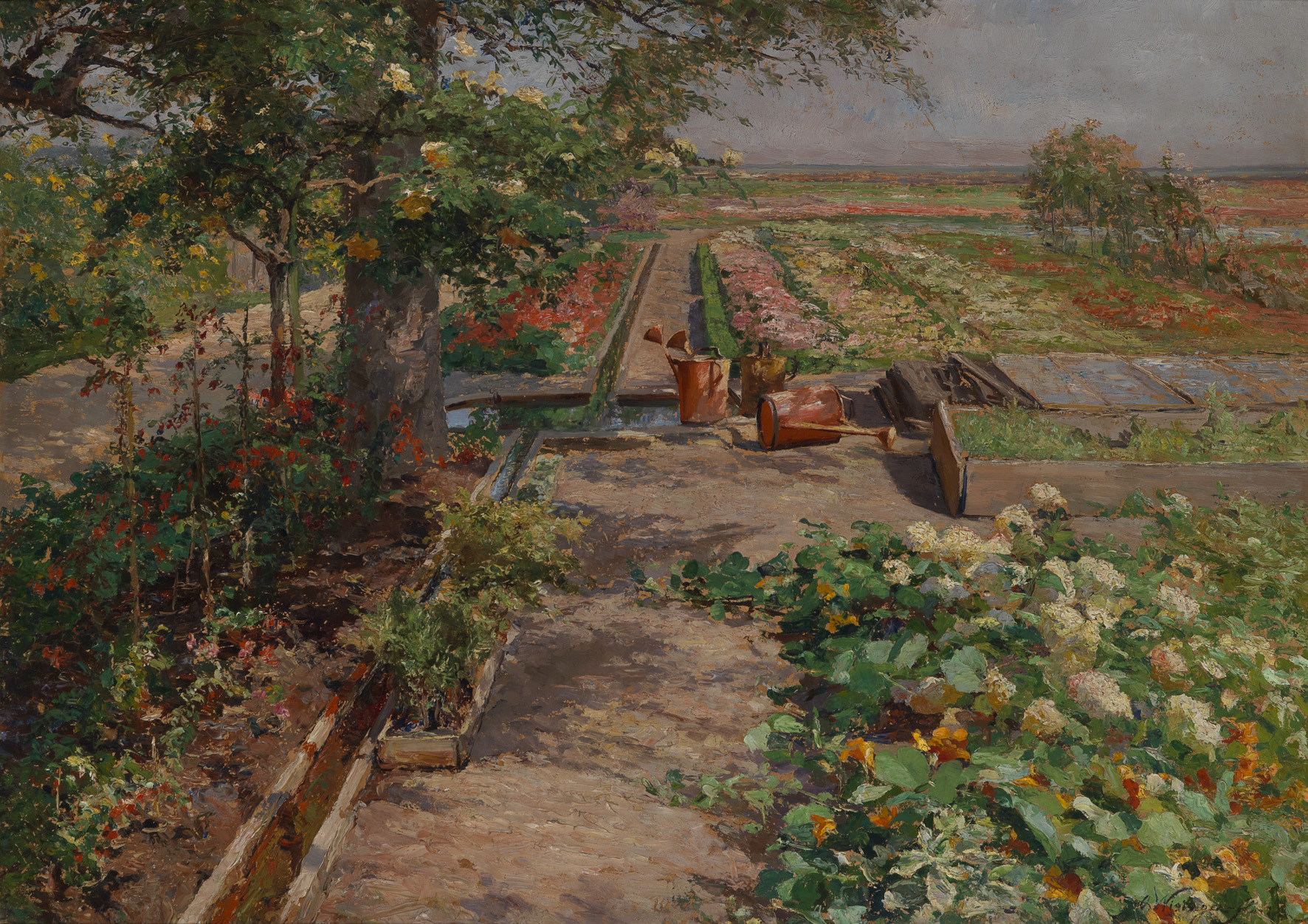
In the Garden

== Sources and further reading ==
- M. Schwab, "Olga Wisinger-Florian", master's thesis, Vienna, 1991
- P. Müller and P. Weninger, Die Schule von Plankenberg, exhibition guide, Vienna, 1991
- A(dalbert). F(ranz). Seligmann (1862–1945), Olga Wisinger-Florian, Neue Freie Presse, 3.11.1924
- Bärbel Holaus, "Olga Wisinger-Florian (1844–1926): Arrangement mit dem "Männlichen" in der Kunst", in: Jahrhundert der Frauen: vom Impressionismus zur Gegenwart; Österreich 1870 bis heute, Ed.: I. Brugger (born 1960, Zell am See), Wien: Kunstforum, 1999, pp. 84‒103
- Eisenberg, Ludwig (1858–1910), Künstler- und Schriftstellerlexikon "Das geistige Wien", 1891, p. 406, Wien, Heinrich Brockhausen
- Edith Futscher, "Olga Wisinger-Florian". In: exhibition catalogue from das Kunsthaus Mürzzuschlag "Natürliche Natur. Österreichische Malerei des Stimmungsimpressionismus"., 1994, 250 S., ÖWF: pp. 214‒17, Mürzzuschlag
- H. Kratzer, Die großen Österreicherinnen. 90 außergewöhnliche Frauen im Porträt. 2001, Wien, Ueberreuter
- Peter Weninger, Olga Wisinger-Florian, Katalog zur Ausstellung im NÖ Landesmuseum. Die Schule von Plankenberg, Emil Jakob Schindler und der österreichische Stimmungsimpressionismus., 1991, pp. 45‒47, 148, Graz
- H. Zeman (born 1940, Pernitz), Die Porträtmalerin Marie Müller 1847‒1935. Leben und Werk. Samt ihrem Briefwechsel mit der Dichterin Marie v. Ebner-Eschenbach und unter Berücks. d. Porträtmalerin Bertha Müller 1848‒1937., 2002, p. 124, Wien, self-published
