= List of painters from Austria =

Notable Austrian artists

This is a list of notable painters from, or associated with, Austria.

== A ==
- Josef Abel (1768–1818)
- Fritz Aigner (1930–2005)
- Joseph Matthäus Aigner (1818–1886)
- Tivadar Alconiere (1797–1865)
- Oz Almog (born 1956)
- Franz Alt (1821–1914)
- Rudolf von Alt (1812–1905)
- Anton Altmann (1808–1871)
- Friedrich von Amerling (1803–1887)
- Heinz Anger (born 1941)
- Christian Attersee (born 1940)
- Josef Maria Auchentaller (1865–1949)

== B ==
- Alfred Basel (1876–1920)
- Herbert Bayer (1900–1985)
- Franz von Bayros (1866–1924)
- Tommaso Benedetti (1797–1863)
- Julius Victor Berger (1850–1902)
- Joseph Bergler (1753–1829)
- Joseph Binder (1798–1864)
- Eduard Bitterlich (1833–1872)
- Karl von Blaas (1815–1894)
- Tina Blau (1845–1916)
- Otto Böhler (1847–1913)
- Johann Böss (1822–1887)
- Friedrich August Brand (1735–1806)
- Antonietta Brandeis (1849–1910)
- Franz Brandner (born 1962)
- Arik Brauer (1929–2021)
- Günter Brus (1938–2024)

== C ==
- Hans Canon (1829–1885)
- Franz Caucig (1755–1828)
- Edgar Chahine (1874–1947)
- Eduard Charlemont (1848–1906)
- Hugo Charlemont (1850–1939)
- Franz Cižek (1865–1946)
- Johann Nepomuk della Croce (1736–1819)
- Carl Otto Czeschka (1878–1960)

== D ==
- Alexander Johann Dallinger von Dalling (1783–1844)
- Johann Dallinger von Dalling (1741–1806)
- Johann Baptist Dallinger von Dalling (1782–1868)
- Josef Danhauser (1805–1845)
- Hugo Darnaut (1851–1937)
- Franz Defregger (1835–1921)
- Anton Depauly (1801–1866)
- Ludwig Deutsch (1855–1935)
- Johann Conrad Dorner (1810–1866)
- Johann Baptist Drechsler (1766–1811)

== E ==
- Johann Georg Edlinger (1741–1819)
- Albin Egger-Lienz (1868–1926)
- Marie Egner (1850–1940)
- Bettina Ehrlich (1903–1985)
- Anton Einsle (1801–1871)
- Franz Eisenhut (1857–1903)
- August Eisenmenger (1830–1907)
- Rudolf Eisenmenger (1902–1994)
- Eduard Ender (1822–1883)
- Johann Ender (1793–1854)
- Thomas Ender (1793–1875)
- Eduard von Engerth (1818–1897)
- Rudolf Ernst (1854–1932)
- Franz Eybl (1806–1880)

== F ==
- Anton Faistauer (1887–1930)
- Anton Filkuka (1888–1957)
- Bernd Fasching (1955–2021)
- Eugen Felix (1836–1906)
- Peter Fendi (1796–1842)
- Johann Fischbach (1797–1871)
- Ludwig Hans Fischer (1848–1915)
- Vinzenz Fischer (1729–1810)
- Camilla Friedländer (1856−1928)
- Friedrich Ritter von Friedländer-Malheim (1825–1901)
- Emil Fuchs (1866–1929)
- Ernst Fuchs (1930–2015)
- Joseph von Führich (1800–1876)

== G ==
- Friedrich Gauermann (1807–1862)
- Peter Johann Nepomuk Geiger (1805–1880)
- Richard Geiger (1870–1945)
- Franz Geyling (1803–1875)
- Richard Gerstl (1883–1908)
- Luigi Gillarduzzi (1822–1856)
- Hilda Goldwag (1912–2008)
- Alexander Demetrius Goltz (1857–1944)
- Helmuth Gräff (born 1958)
- Matthias Laurenz Gräff (born 1984)
- Josef Grassi (1757–1838)
- Christian Griepenkerl (1839–1916)
- Eduard Gurk (1801–1841)
- Ludwig Guttenbrunn (1750–1819)

== H ==
- Gabriel von Hackl (1843–1926)
- Robert Hammerstiel (1933–2020)
- Anton Hansch (1813–1876)
- Felix Albrecht Harta (1884-1967)
- Anton Hartinger (1806–1890)
- Rudolf Hausner (1914–1995)
- Xenia Hausner (born 1951)
- Joseph Heicke (1811–1861)
- Gottfried Helnwein (born 1948)
- Mercedes Helnwein (born 1979)
- Claudius Herr (1775–1838)
- Louis Christian Hess (1895–1944)
- Adolf Hitler (1889–1945)
- Johann Nepomuk Hoechle (1790–1835)
- Rudolf Alfred Höger (1877–1930)
- Wolfgang Hollegha (1929-2023)
- Stephanie Hollenstein (1886–1944)
- Theodor von Hörmann (1840–1895)
- Alfred Hrdlicka (1928–2009)
- Adolf Humborg (1847–1921)
- Friedensreich Hundertwasser (1928–2000)

== J ==
- Paul Jaeg (born 1949)
- Adam Jankowski (born 1948)
- Fritz Janschka (1919–2016)
- Rudolf Jettmar (1869–1939)

== K ==
- Alexander Kaiser (1819–1872)
- Eduard Kaiser (1820–1895)
- Hermann Kern (1838–1912)
- Alexander Kircher (1867–1939)
- Raphael Kirchner (1876–1917)
- Ernst Klimt (1864–1892)
- Gustav Klimt (1862–1918)
- Julius Klinger (1876–1942)
- Martin Knoller (1725–1804)
- Ludwig Koch (1866–1934)
- Kiki Kogelnik (1935–1997)
- Oskar Kokoschka (1886–1980)
- Friedrich König (1857–1941)
- Rudolf Kortokraks (1928–2014)
- Barbara Krafft (1764–1825)
- Johann Peter Krafft (1780–1856)
- Johann Victor Krämer (1861–1949)
- Siegfried L. Kratochwil (1916–2005)
- Joseph Kreutzinger (1757–1829)
- Josef Kriehuber (1757–1829)
- Carl Kronberger (1800–1876)
- Elke Krystufek (born 1970)
- Alfred Kubin (1877–1959)
- Leopold Kupelwieser (1796–1862)
- Max Kurzweil (1867–1916)
- Karl Joseph Kuwasseg (1802–1877)

== L ==
- Demeter Laccataris (1798–1864)
- Siegmund L'Allemand (1840–1910)
- Johann Baptist von Lampi the Elder (1751–1830)
- Johann Baptist von Lampi the Younger (1775–1837)
- Hans Larwin (1873–1938)
- Maria Lassnig (1919–2014)
- Wilhelm Legler (1875–1951)
- Helmut Leherb (1933–1997)
- Anton Lehmden (1929–2018)
- Felix Ivo Leicher (1727–1812)
- Maximilian Liebenwein (1869–1926)
- Bertold Löffler (1874–1960)
- Friedrich Loos (1797–1890)

== M ==
- Georg Mader (1824–1881)
- Hans Makart (1840–1884)
- Anton von Maron (1733–1808)
- Franz von Matsch (1861–1942)
- Hubert Maurer (1738–1818)
- Gabriel von Max (1840–1915)
- Georg Mayer-Marton (1897–1960)
- Karl Mediz (1868–1945)
- Emilie Mediz-Pelikan (1861–1908)
- Edgar Meyer (1853–1925)
- Josef Mikl (1929–2008)
- Carl Moll (1861–1945)
- Josef Moroder-Lusenberg (1846–1939)
- Joseph Mössmer (1780–1845)
- Otto Muehl (1925–2013)
- Leopold Müller (1834–1892)

== N ==
- Joseph Nigg (1782–1863)
- Hermann Nitsch (1938–2022)

== O ==
- Joseph Oberbauer (1853–1926)
- Karl O'Lynch von Town (1869–1942)
- Emil Orlík (1870–1932)

== P ==
- Ludwig Passini (1832–1903)
- Elmar Peintner (born 1954)
- Max Peintner (born 1937)
- Eduard Peithner von Lichtenfels (1833–1913)
- August von Pettenkofen (1821–1889)
- Franz Xaver Petter (1791–1866)
- Adalbert Pilch (1917–2004)
- Max Edler von Poosch (1872–1968)
- Karl Postl (1769–1818)
- August Prinzhofer (1816–1885)
- Erwin Puchinger (1875–1944)
- Norbert Pümpel (born 1956)

== Q ==
- Martin Ferdinand Quadal (1736–1811)

== R ==
- Carl Rahl (1812–1865)
- Arnulf Rainer (1929–2025)
- Barbara Rapp (born 1972)
- Josef Rebell (1787–1828)
- Erwin Redl (born 1963)
- Thomas Reinhold (born 1953)
- Maximilian Reinitz (1872–1935)
- Oscar Rex (1857–1929)
- Ferdinand von Řezníček (1868–1909)
- Michael Rieser (1828–1905)
- Alfred Roller (1864–1935)
- Anton Romako (1832–1889)
- Constantin Daniel Rosenthal (1820–1851)
- Utz Rothe (1940–2024)
- Johann Michael Rottmayr (1656–1730)
- Franz Rumpler (1848–1922)
- Ferdinand Runk (1764–1834)

== S ==
- Johann Michael Sattler (1786–1847)
- August Schaeffer (1833–1916)
- Albert Schickedanz (1846–1915)
- Egon Schiele (1890–1918)
- Carl Schindler (1821–1842)
- Emil Jakob Schindler (1842–1892)
- Mathias Schmid (1835-1923)
- Christoph Schmidberger (born 1974)
- Max Schödl (1834–1921)
- Robert Schöller (born 1950)
- Carl Schuch (1846–1903)
- Paul Schuss (born 1948)
- Hans Schwarz (1922–2003)
- Fritz Schwarz-Waldegg (1889–1942)
- De Es Schwertberger (born 1942)
- Moritz von Schwind (1804–1871)
- Anna Stainer-Knittel (1841–1915)
- Franz Steinfeld (1787–1868)
- Adalbert Stifter (1805–1868)
- Ernst Stöhr (1860–1917)
- Josefine Swoboda (1861–1929)
- Rudolf Swoboda (1859–1914)

== T ==
- Bertha von Tarnóczy (1846–1936)
- Josef Eduard Teltscher (1801–1837)

== U ==
- Carola Unterberger-Probst (born 1978)
- Andreas Untersberger (1874–1944)

== W ==
- Aloys Wach (1892–1940)
- Ferdinand Georg Waldmüller (1793–1865)
- Max Weiler (1910–2001)
- Franz West (1947–2012)
- Horst Widmann (born 1938)
- Olga Wisinger-Florian (1844–1926)
- Marie Elisabeth Wrede (1898-1981)
- Michael Wutky (1739–1822/23)

== Z ==
- Carl Wenzel Zajicek (1860–1923)
- Roman Zenzinger (1903–1990)
- Johann Ziegler (1749–1812)
- Alfred Zoff (1852–1927)
- Aloys Zötl (1803–1887)

== See also ==
- List of Austrians
- Lists of artists
