= Dallinger =

Dallinger is a surname. Notable people with the surname include:

- James Dallinger (1989-), New Zealand rower
- William Dallinger (1839–1909), scientist and British minister in the Wesleyan Methodist Church
- Frederick W. Dallinger (1871–1955), American Republican politician
- Johann Dallinger von Dalling (1741–1806), Austrian painter
  - Johann Baptist Dallinger von Dalling (1782–1868), his son, also an Austrian painter
  - Alexander Johann Dallinger von Dalling (1783–1844), his second son, also an Austrian painter
- Reinhard Dallinger (1950-), Austrian zoologist
- Maximilian Dallinger (1996-), German sport shooter
