= Dallinger von Dalling =

Dallinger von Dalling is a surname. Notable people with the surname include:

- Johann Dallinger von Dalling (1741–1806), Austrian painter
  - Johann Baptist Dallinger von Dalling (1782–1868), his son, also an Austrian painter
  - Alexander Johann Dallinger von Dalling (1783–1844), his second son, also an Austrian painter
