= Kronberger =

Kronberger is a surname. Notable people with the surname include:

- Carl Kronberger (1841–1921), Austrian painter
- Hans Kronberger (disambiguation), multiple people
- Lily Kronberger (1890–1974), Hungarian figure skater
- Maximilian Kronberger (1888–1904), German poet
- Petra Kronberger (born 1969), Austrian alpine skier

== See also ==
- Kronberger 61, planetary nebula
