= Hans Larwin =

Austrian painter (1873–1938)

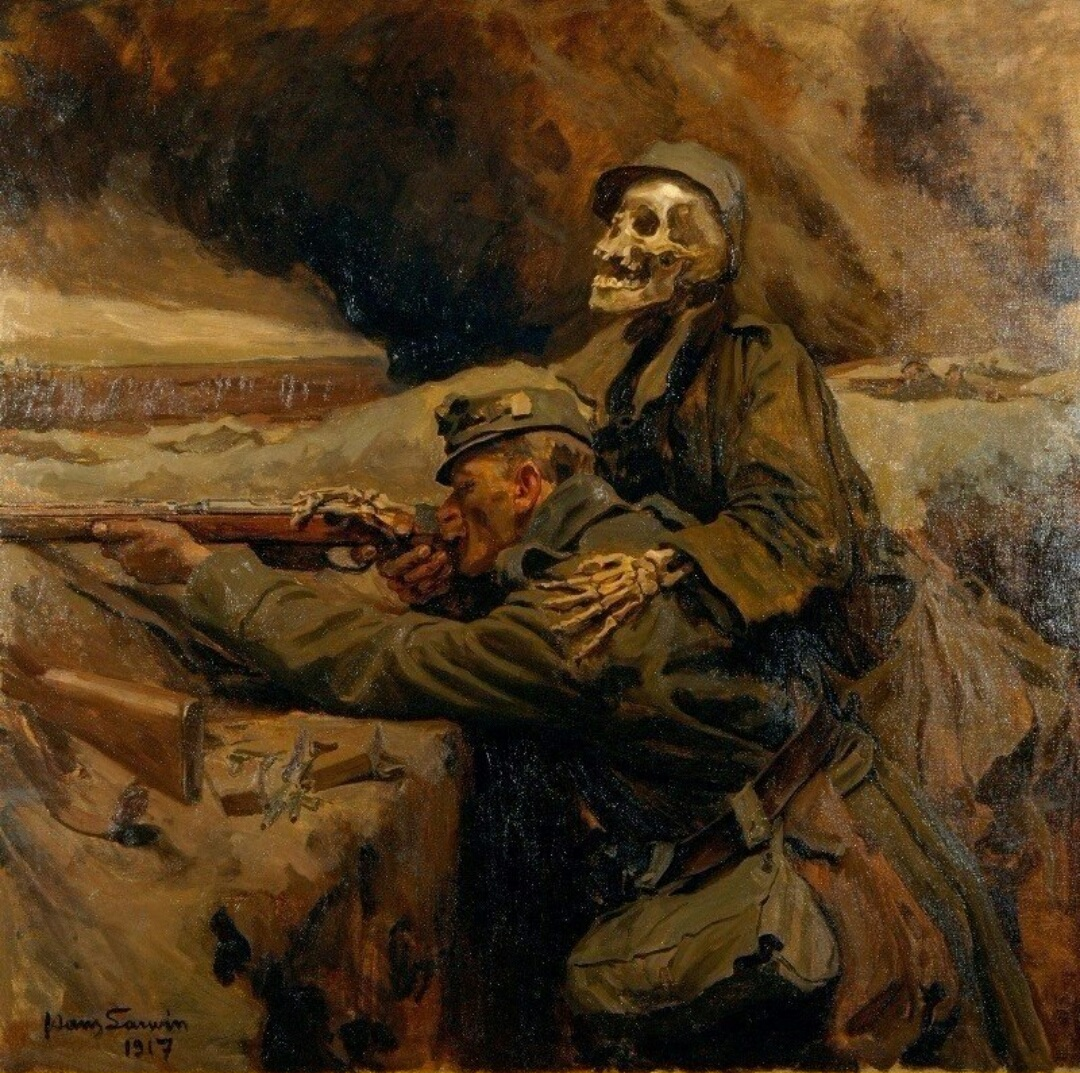
- Soldat und Tod, 1917
- Born: Johann Larwin; 6 December 1873; Vienna, Austria-Hungary
- Died: 17 November 1938 (aged 64); Vienna, Federal State of Austria
- Known for: Painting
- Occupation: Academician
- Employers: Academy of Fine Arts Vienna; Höhere Graphische Bundes-Lehr- und Versuchsanstalt

Signature
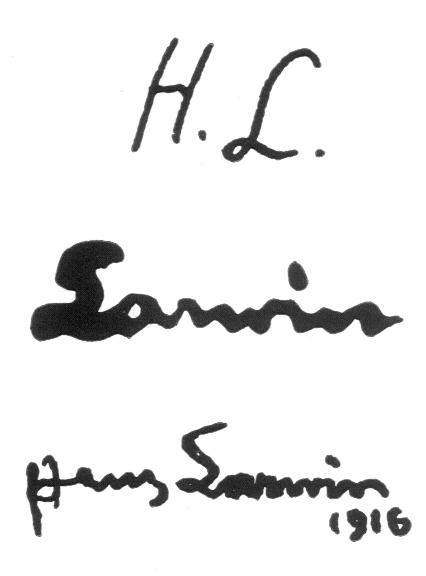

Hans Larwin (6 December 1873 – 17 November 1938) was a Viennese genre painter and academician.

== Life ==
Larwin was the son of bookbinder Johann Larwin and his wife Karoline (née Veihinger). He attended at a Kunstgewerbeschule (Austrian vocational arts school) in Vienna and studied from 1889 at the Academy of Fine Arts. He studied under such artists as Christian Griepenkerl in 1891, from 1893 with August Eisenmenger and from 1894 with Kazimierz Pochwalski.

Around 1900, Larwin undertook numerous study trips to Rome, Munich, Paris, and the Netherlands. In 1902 he became a member of the Vienna Künstlerhaus gallery, and had his first exhibitions there. He was also a member of the "Alte Welt" artists' association. During World War I, he was involved as an official war painter on various fronts for the Austria-Hungary dual monarchy.

After a stay in Chicago (1922–24) Larwin lived between 1925 and 1927 in Slovakia, Hungary, and Yugoslavia. In 1927 he returned to Vienna, where he became professor and director of the general painting school at the Vienna Academy of Fine Arts in 1930. He also taught at the Higher Graphic Federal Institute of Education and Research.

His patron was Jenny Mautner (1856–1938) and her husband, Isidor Mautner (1852–1930), the owners of the Marienthal textile factory since 1925.

His grave is located at the Vienna Central Cemetery.

== Awards ==
Throughout his career he received many awards.

- 1898: Rompreis (state travel scholarship)
- 1907: Little Golden State Medal; for his oil painting Branntweiner
- 1908: Imperial Prize; for his oil painting Sonntagabend in Neustift (Sunday evening in Neustift)
- 1910: Archduke Carl Ludwig Medal; for his oil painting Beim Heurigen (At Heurigen)
- 1913: Great Golden State Medal; for his oil painting Wiener Stadtratssitzung under Lueger (Vienna City Council meeting under Lueger)
- 1914: Friedrich Dobner of the Dobenau Prize; for his oil painting Nach der Assanierung in Erdberg(After mating in Erdberg)
- 1915: Prize of the City of Vienna
- 1926: State Prize
- 1927: Reichel Prize
- 1953: Larwingasse in the 22nd municipal district of Donaustadt was named after him

== Works ==
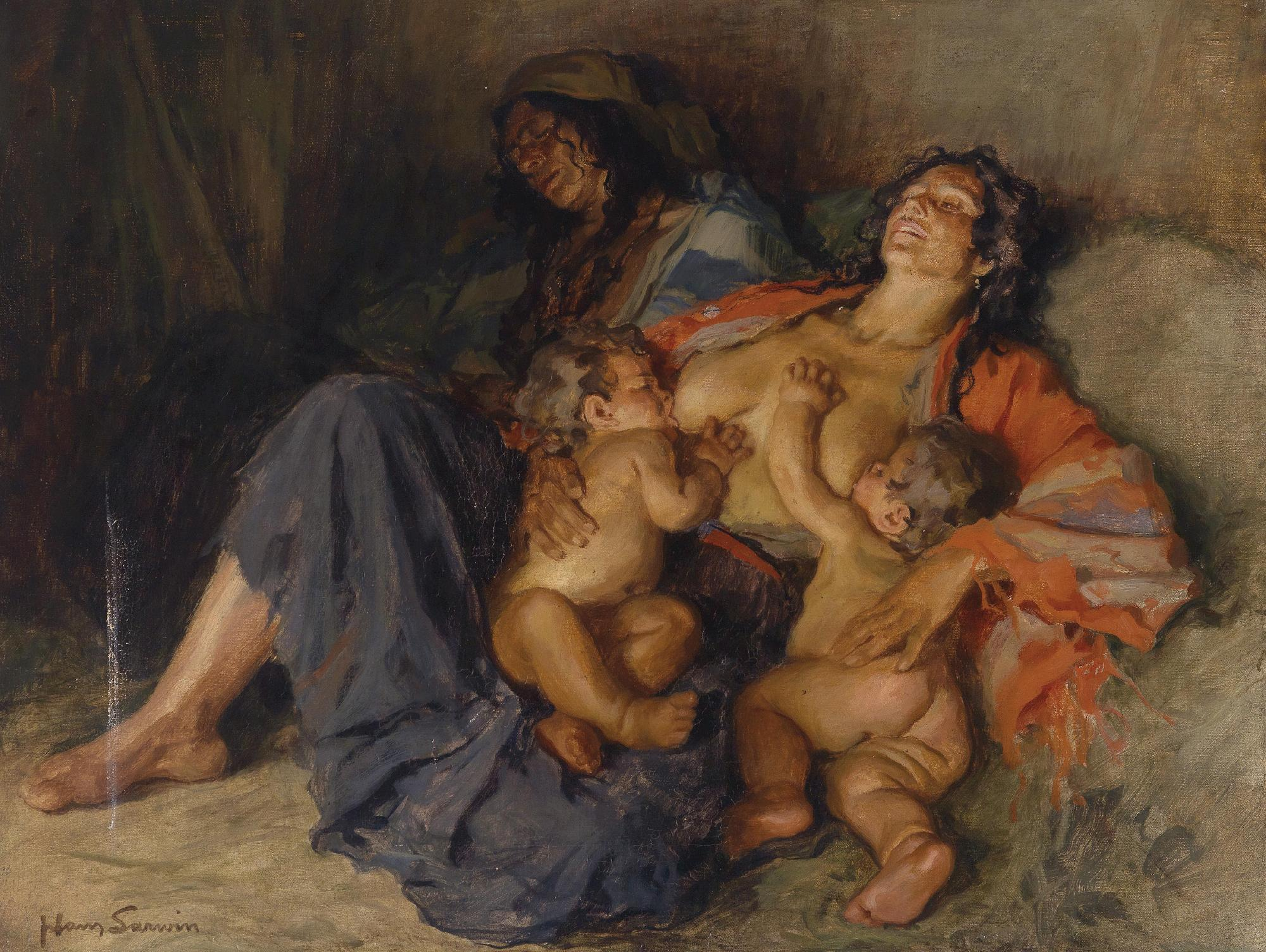
Gypsies with their two Children - Zigeunerinnen mit ihren zwei Kindern, 1920s

Hans Larwin was known mainly as a genre painter of the Viennese suburbs and scenes from the Viennese national life, but also created portraits. His favorite techniques were oil and pastel painting as well as drawing.

- Branntweiner, 1907.
- Sitzung des Wiener Stadtrats unter Lueger, 1907 (Vienna Museum).
- Beim Heurigen, 1910.
- Illustrationen für den ersten Band der bekannten Kremser-Alben, 1911.
- Nach der Assanierung in Erdberg, 1914.
- Soldat und Tod, 1917, Museum of Military History, Vienna
- Zigeunerin mit Zwillingen, 1920s, Art Institute of Chicago?

== See also ==
- List of painters from Austria

== Bibliography ==
Notes

References

- Austrian Academy of Sciences (1972). "Österreichisches Biographisches Lexikon 1815–1950" (PDF). Österreichisches Biographisches Lexikon 1815–1950, Austrian Academy of Sciences.
- Czeike, Felix (1994). Historisches Lexikon Wien: in 5 Bänden, Volume 3 (in German). Kremayr & Scheriau. ISBN 9783218005456. - Total pages: 700
- Fuchs, Heinrich (1979). Die österreichischen Maler des 19. Jahrhunderts. Ergänzungsband : 2. L - Z, Volume 2 (in German). Selbstverl.
- Thieme, Ulrich; Becker, Felix (1927). Allgemeines Lexikon der bildenden Künstler von der Antike bis zur Gegenwart (English: General Dictionary of Artists from Antiquity to the Present) (in German). Verlag E.A. Seemann. - Total pages: 604
- Vienna Central Cemetery (2017). "Prof. Hans Larwin". Vienna Central Cemetery.
- Vollmer, Hans; Thieme, Ulrich (1956). Allgemeines Lexikon der bildenden Künstler des XX. Jahrhunderts: Bd. K-P (in German). E.A. Seemann.
- Vries, Guus de Vries (2016). The Great War Through Picture Postcards. Pen and Sword Books. ISBN 9781473856714. - Total pages: 256
