= Mathias Schmid =

Austrian painter (1835–1923)

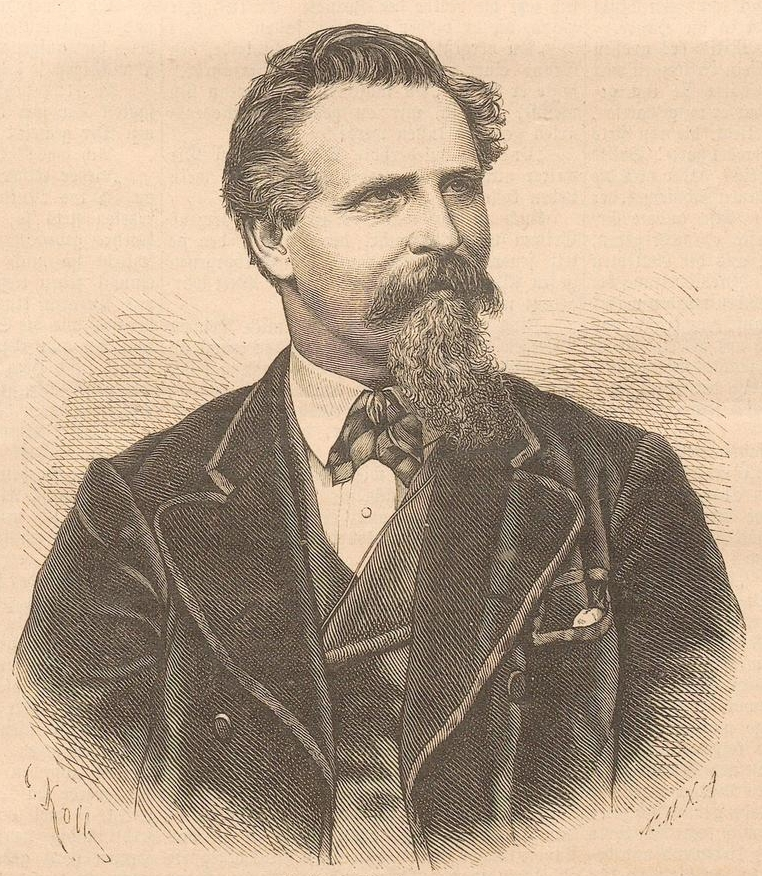
- Born: December 14, 1835; See, Tyrol, Austrian Empire
- Died: January 22, 1923 (aged 87); Munich, Germany
- Education: Academy of Fine Arts, Munich
- Known for: Genre painting
- Movement: Munich school

Mathias Schmid (14 December 1835 – 22 January 1923) was an Austrian painter associated with the Munich school. He became known for genre scenes depicting rural life in the Tyrolean Alps, rendered with detailed observation, narrative composition, and elements of humor. His works were widely reproduced and contributed to the popular visual representation of Alpine folk culture in the late nineteenth century.

== Early life and education ==
Schmid was born in the village of See, Tyrol im Paznaun. He received his first artistic instruction at the drawing school in Innsbruck before enrolling at the Academy of Fine Arts, Munich in 1853. In Munich he studied under Karl von Piloty and became part of the circle of genre painters active in the city during the second half of the nineteenth century.

== Career ==
After completing his studies, Schmid settled in Munich but made regular trips to Tyrol to sketch rural scenes, religious customs, and local characters. These studies formed the basis of his mature paintings, which often portrayed domestic interiors, village gatherings, and humorous episodes drawn from Alpine life. His works were exhibited in Munich, Vienna, and Berlin, and he became a member of the Munich Artists’ Association in 1890.

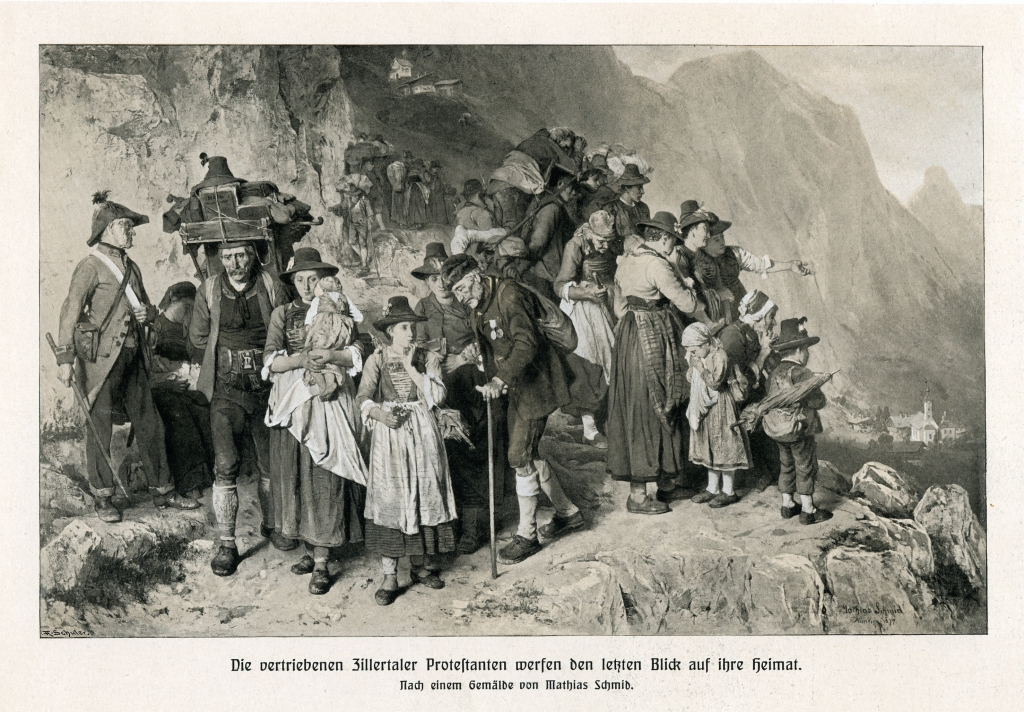
Die Zillertaler Protestanten – Letzter Blick in die Heimat (1877)

One of Schmid's most significant works is Die Zillertaler Protestanten – Letzter Blick in die Heimat (1877), depicting the expulsion of Protestant families from the Zillertal in 1837. The painting shows the so‑called “Inklinanten” at the moment they leave their valley for the last time, combining historical accuracy with emotional restraint. The subject remains a central episode in Tyrolean religious history and continues to receive scholarly and public attention.

== Artistic style and themes ==
Schmid's work is associated with the broader tradition of the Munich School, particularly its emphasis on narrative genre scenes. His paintings typically feature depictions of rural and peasant life, representations of Tyrolean customs and religious practices, tavern scenes, domestic interiors, and character studies.

Notable works include:

- Der Herrgottsschnitzer
- Der Pfarrer kommt
- Beim Kartenspiel
- Tiroler Hochzeitszug
- Die Zillertaler Protestanten – Letzter Blick in die Heimat (1877)

== Later life and death ==
Schmid continued to work in Munich into the early twentieth century. Although artistic tastes shifted during his lifetime, his paintings remained popular with collectors interested in Alpine genre scenes. He died in Munich on 22 January 1923.
