= Norbert Pümpel =

Austrian artist

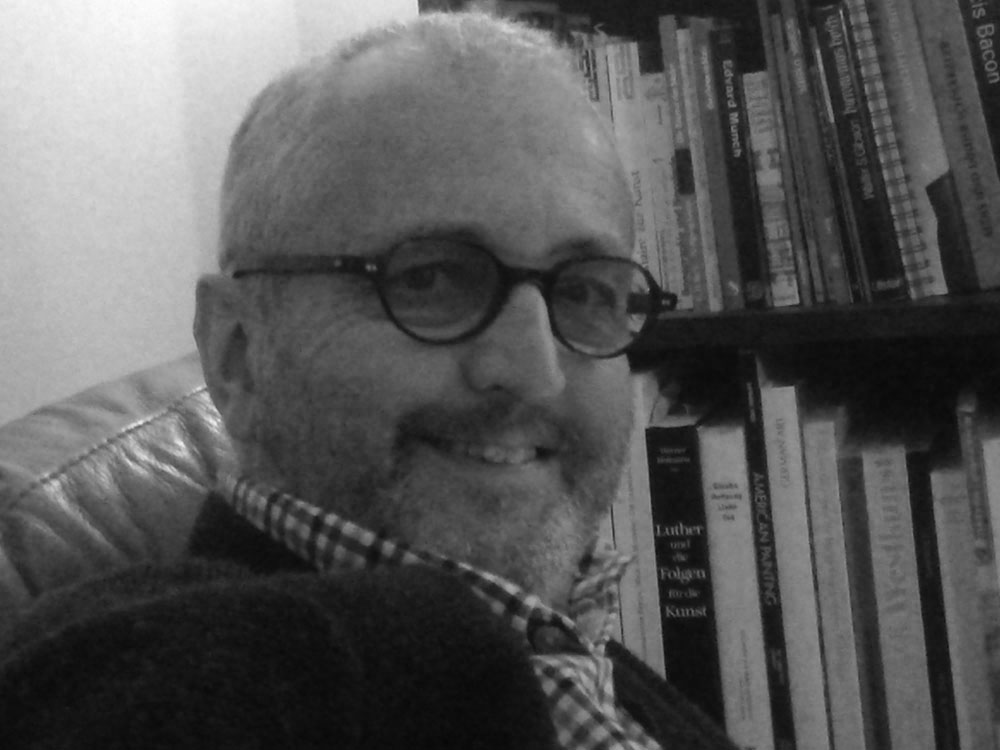
Norbert Pümpel, May 2013

Norbert Pümpel (born 1956 in Innsbruck, Austria) is a visual artist who lives and works in Drosendorf an der Thaya in Austria.

== Biography ==
Pümpel studied mathematics, physics and philosophy but did not graduate. He did not attend an art academy; as an artist, he is self-taught. His artistic career began in the late 1970s in the field of conceptual art. His works include entropic drawings (from 1976), laser projects (1980), works on the theory of black holes (1981) and on Schrödinger’s cat paradox. In 1991, Pümpel took up a lectureship in sculptural design at the University of Innsbruck, and in 1994–95 he gave lectures on the subject of ‘Space in Contemporary Art’ at the same university. In 2008, Pümpel moved from Landeck (Tyrol) to Götzis (Vorarlberg) and opened a studio in Hohenems in 2011. In 2020, he moved to Drosendorf and set up his studio in the Bergamtshaus.

== University teaching ==
- 1981: Lecture at the Sky Art Conference Massachusetts Institute of Technology Cambridge Mass.
- 1991: Lecture on Sculpture Leopold Franzens Universität Innsbruck
- 1994/95 Lecture Space in Contemporary Art Leopold Franzens Universität Innsbruck

== Introduction ==
Reality has evaporated

"Since the 1970s he has developed an art that operates at the interface of natural science, philosophy and theology, circling – on continually spiraling paths of thought – the old question of the possibility and the limits of human knowledge and, by extension, orbiting the potential of the image and its powers compared with reality." (Harald Kimpel, 2011)

What are at first questions of physics give way more and more to problems of philosophy and the theory of knowledge. It is evident that the artist, as a part of the universe, reflects on it and on himself: "Part of Universe Reflecting Part of Universe" (2004), a series of small diptychs first shown in the "Kraftwerk Peripher" exhibition organized by Christoph Bertsch in the Imst/Au power station. Some of the works now form part of the Liaunig Collection.

Peace policy is a frequent topic in Pümpel's work, starting with the monumental drawing "Probability Statement on a Guernica in the Late 20th Century" (1982). "In 1982, when N. Pümpel developed an infinite panorama of entropy under the title 'Probability Statement on a Guernica in the Late 20th Century', he simultaneously defined the beginning and endpoint for his future art. So completely had the artist eliminated the visible with his radical statement about the potential consequences of theory become practice, so fundamentally destroyed all form in shaping shapelessness, that – having depicted the irreversible state of chaos – there remained nothing capable of depiction. The very framework of matter had shattered and been dissolved once and for all in universal disorder. At an early point in his biography, therefore, the artist had adopted an extreme position with his views of nothingness, with an uncompromising message that could not but call into question any further form of constructive work." (Harald Kimpel, 1990) The nuclear threat is also a recurrent subject with Pümpel the physicist. In 1989, he created the first Scientific Disaster Series (1990), his first ash works on Hiroshima and Nagasaki. Between 2009 and 2011, too, Pümpel created large-format paper works under the title "Nuclear Solstice" on the subject of the nuclear tests conducted in the 1940s and 50s. Five large works from this group are now in the Liaunig Collection.

In his latest series of works, entitled "Condensates", Pümpel returns to the working methods of the natural sciences, employing laboratory-style test series to develop self-organizing image systems. "The works describe states of probability, blurring all spatial structures in new aggregate states and creating a liquid, fleeting, wave-dynamic image of the world." (Harald Kimpel, 2014) From 1992 to 2002 Member of the Cultural Council of the Tyrolean State Government. In 2008, he moved to Götzis, Vorarlberg, Austria. In 2010, he was awarded the Gold Medal for Merit to the Republic of Austria. From 2010 to 2016, he was a member of the executive board of the Professional Association of Visual Artists in Vorarlberg. 2011 opened a new studio in Hohenems, Austria.

== Major works ==
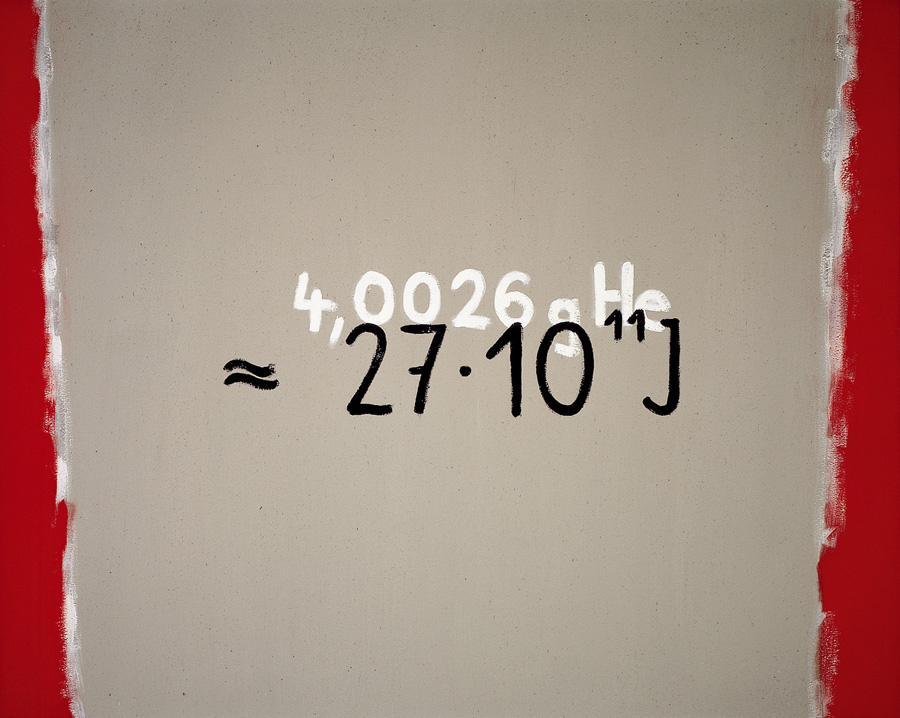
Norbert Pümpel, "Scientific Disaster III", 1990

- Hammerschlag Nr. 2, 1978 Series in three parts; c. 90 x 190 cm, exhibited: Galerie Krinzinger Innsbruck (A) 1979, and Bregenz Palais Thurn und Taxis, 1979; published in: Peter Weiermair, Medium Zeichnung, Allerheiligenpresse Innsbruck 1979, and J.M. Seebacher, Wahrnehmen, Palais Thurn und Taxis, Bregenz, 1979 (Graphic Collection Albertina Vienna)
- Stars and Stripes Projekt, 1981 6 Picture groups of four parts, mixed media and collage on primed paper, 100 x 276 cm to 100 x 1075 cm, exhibited and published in "Künstler aus Tirol", Pécsi Galéria, Pecs (Hungary), 1986; (Public art collection in the center of Alpbach: Schrödinger hall)
- Probability Statement to a Guernica in the Late 20th Century, 1982 24 parts - Installation, 291 x 929,6 cm; exhibites ati "Zukunftsräume – Bildwelten und Weltbilder der Science Fiction", curated by Harald Kimpel, Orangerie, Kassel (Germany), 29. 4. bis 17. 6. 1984 and "Zukunftsräume – Bildwelten und Weltbilder der Science Fiction" Erlangen(G), Städtische Galerie in summer 1984 and also at "Die Vertikale Gefahr. Luftkrieg in der Kunst" [zum 50. Jahrestag der Zerstörung Kassels], documenta- Halle Kassel, 24. 9. bis 31. 10. 1993 as well as at the personal exhibition "Wahrscheinliche Aussage zu einem Guernica des späten 20. Jahrhunderts" at the Tiroler Landesmuseum Ferdinandeum, Innsbruck, 28. 1. bis 20. 2. 2005 published in: Die vertikale Gefahr, Luftkrieg in der Kunst, Marburg 1993 and in Zona Ovest, Skarabäus Studienverlag, Innsbruck, Wien, München 2007 und in Kunst in Tirol, P: Naredi-Rainer, L. Madersbacher, Innsbruck 2007
- Das Große Stadion, 1983 mixed media on primed paper, 3 parts: 126 x 210 cm. Exhibited 1984 at "Orwell und die Gegenwart" in the Museum des 20. Jahrhunderts in Wien (Katalog)
- Heinrich – Heine – Zyklus, 1986 Series of 14 parts, each: 126 x 90 cm, published in: N. Pümpel, Arbeiten 1977–87, Landeck (A), 1987 (Property: Bank Austria Vienna Austria)
- White Fire Curtain, 1990 Egg tempera and ashes on canvas, 190 x 250 cm published in: Harald Kimpel, Die Schwerkraft der Bilder, N. Pümpels kreativer Beitrag zur Theorie der unterlassenen Praxis, in: N. Pümpel, 238,0289, Arbeiten über die universellen Naturkonstanten und die Atombombe, Landeck (Austria), 1990 exhibited and published in: Harald Kimpel; Der Luftkrieg in der Kunst, Kassel, documenta Halle, 1993
- Apricot Disaster 2009, mixed media on paper, 154 x 114 cm (owned by the Republic of Austria: the Federal Artotheque Vienna)
- Scientific Disaster No III, 1990 Egg tempera, cadmiumred and ashes on canvas, 120 x 125 cm exhibited at "Caution – Art" at the Thomas Segal Gallery Boston, 1991 (private property)
- Part of Universe Reflecting Part of Universe, 2003 Four-part work on canvas on wood, 60 x 204 cm, exhibited and published in: Kraftwerk Peripher, Imst-Au, 2004 and at "Realität und Abstraktion 2" Museum Liaunig, 2012 (private property)
- (First Lightning) Dark Lightning (Joe1) 2011, mixed media on paper 154 x 114 cm (private property)
- Devastated Land and South Pacific Winter Series, 2012 – 2013
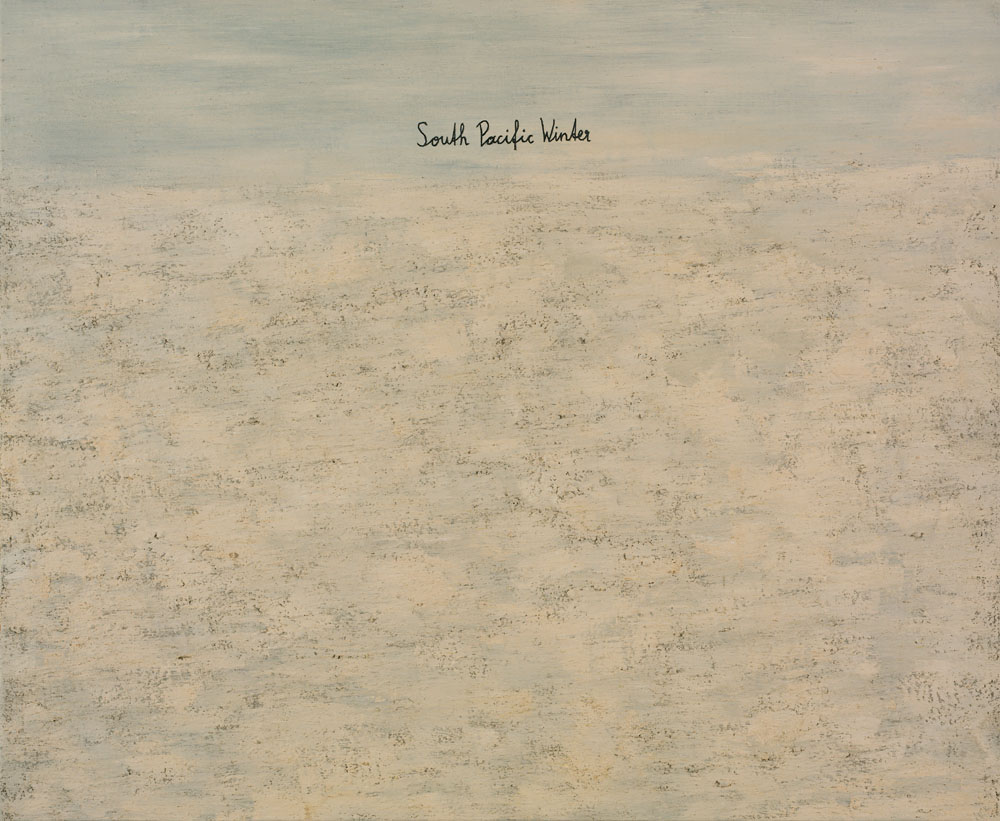
South Pacific Winter, 2012

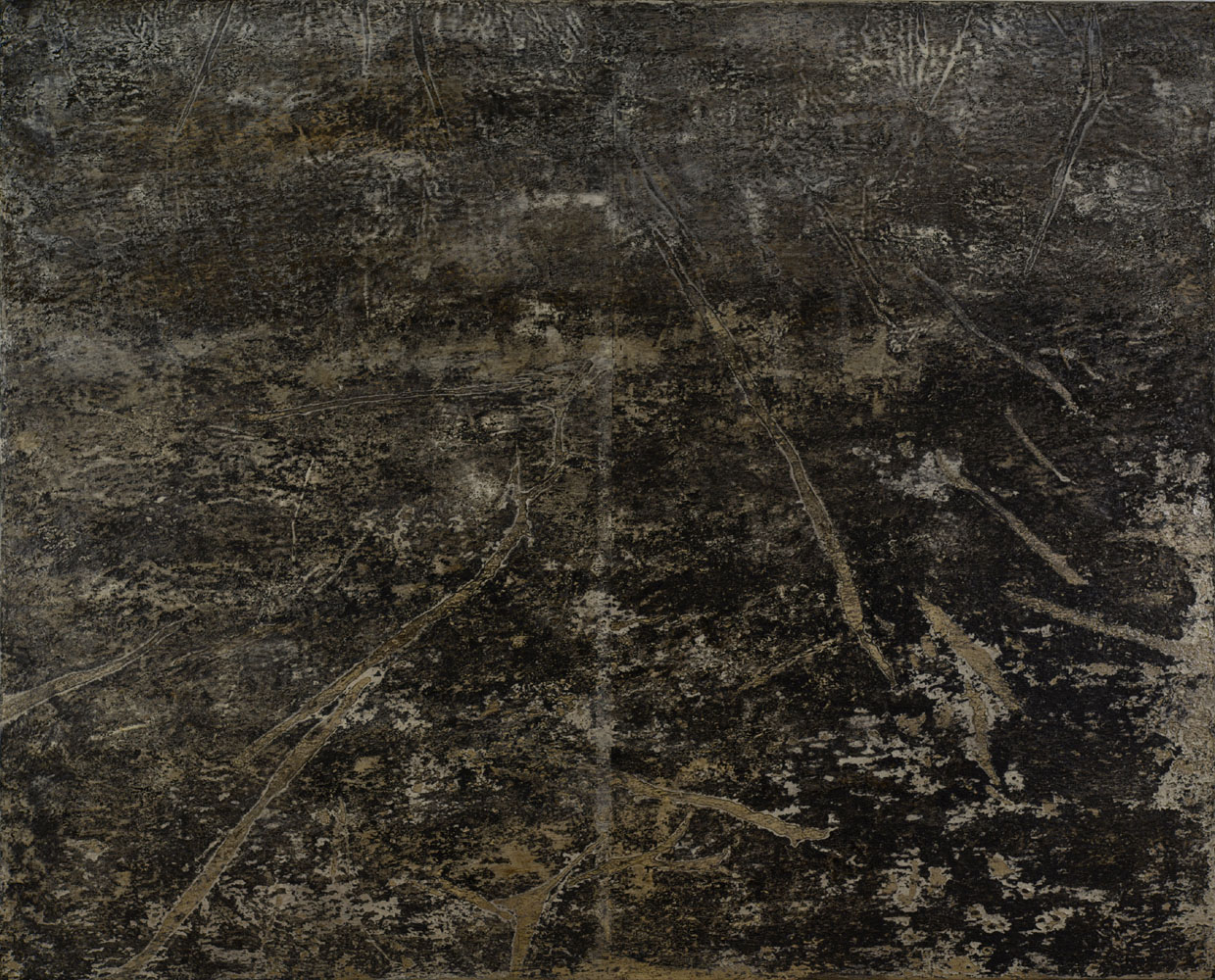
Die Moderne taugt nicht zwingend zur Verbesserung der Welt, 2012
- Indeterminate Land, 2012 – 2015

Starting in 2012, Pümpel used abstract space, a "play of apparent nothingness and matter" (Kurzemann), to develop works in which material is – quasi accidentally – condensed, deposited and accumulated. These more clearly structured pictorial universes are suggestive of atmosphere and landscapes with sometimes clear and sometimes diffuse horizons. What is uncertain is whether this world is liquid, gaseous or solid. It is the image of a world that defies classification or equation with a specific region.

Pümpel's artistic methodology frequently incorporates elements of chance and gradual development, with individual works on paper and canvas taking weeks or months to complete. His structured creative process focuses on systemic organization and deliberate decision-making. To execute these works, he utilizes medium combinations including oils, bitumen, and chemical solutions applied directly onto canvas and thin Chinese rice paper.

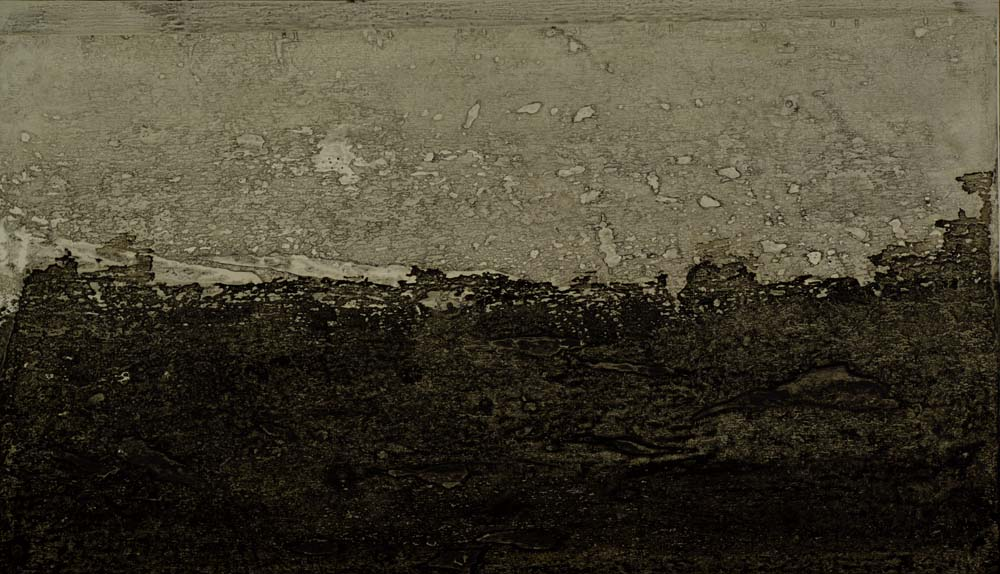
Unbestimmtes Land, 2012

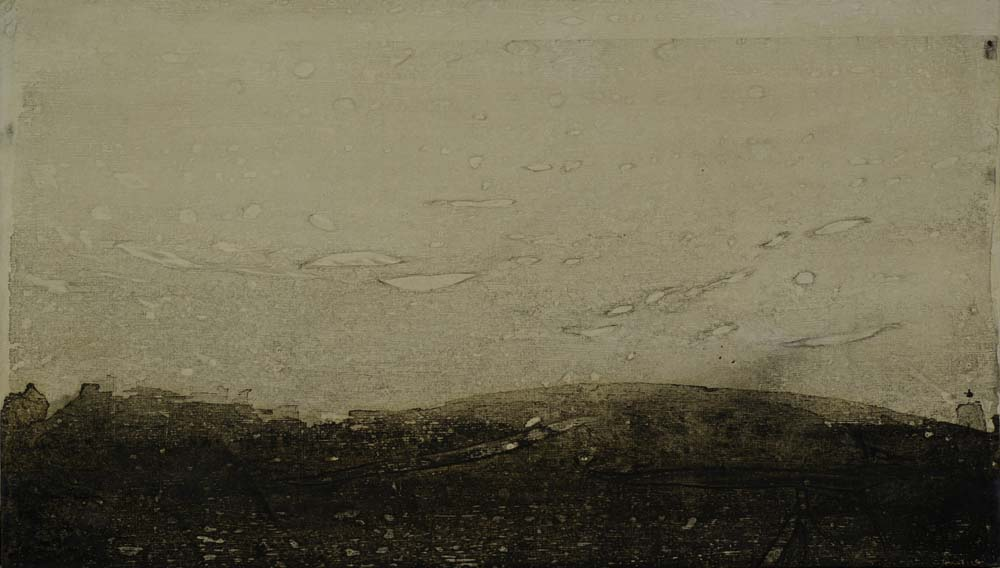
Unbestimmtes Land, 2013

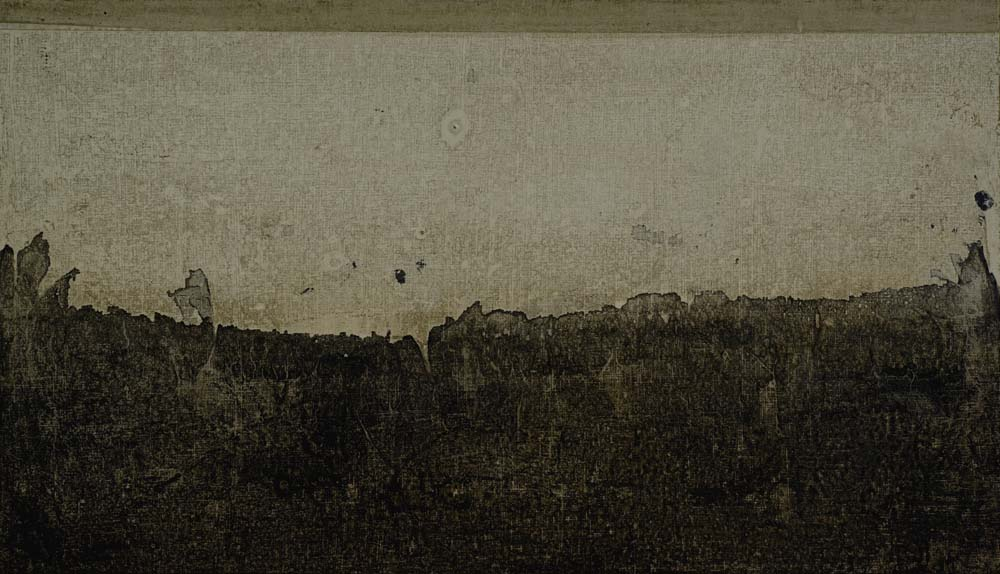
Unbestimmtes Land, 2013
- Objects on Wittgenstein, 2011 – 2013
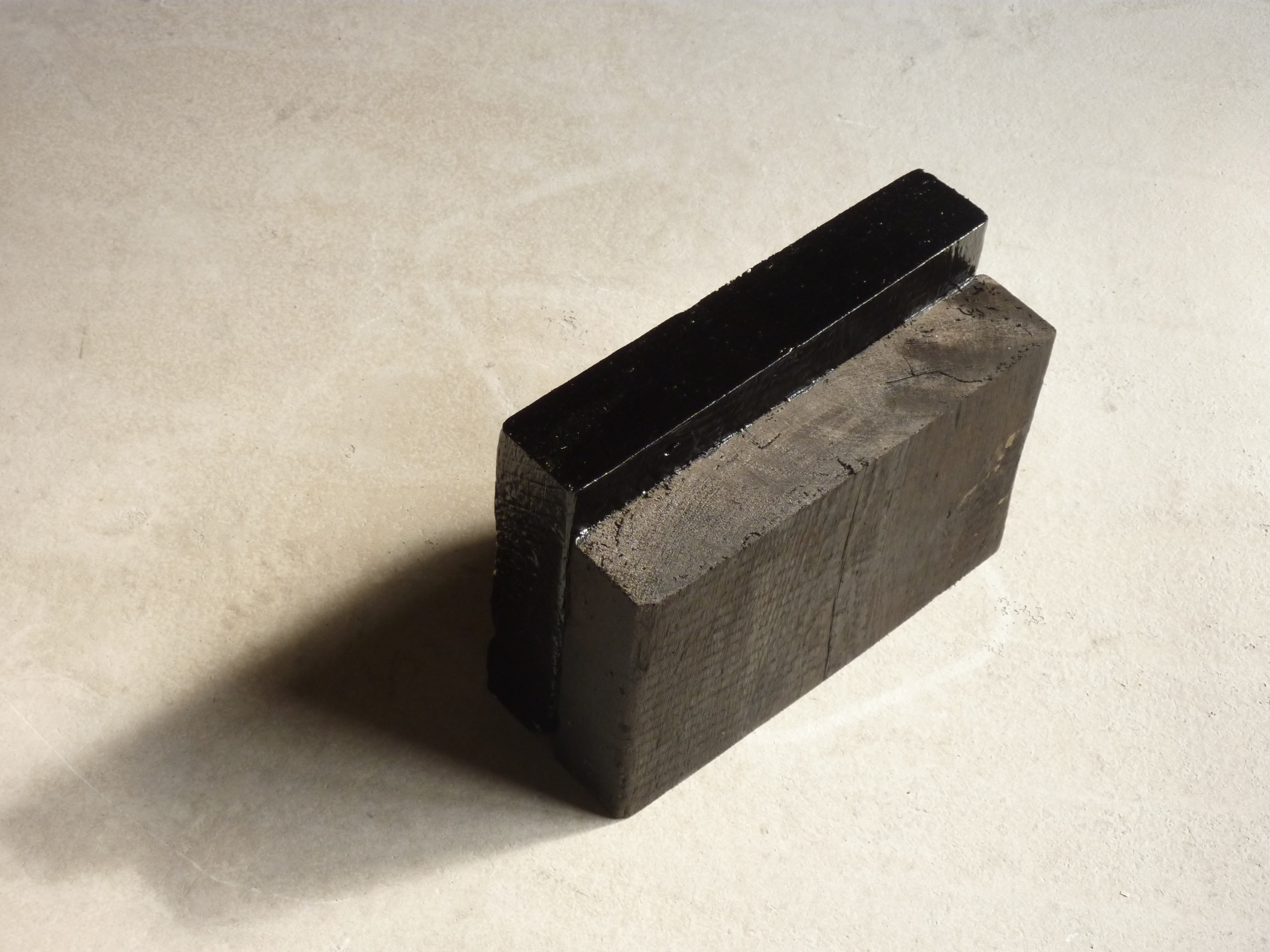
Das Bestehen und Nichtbestehen von Sachverhalten ist die Wirklichkeit, 2012 Object: wood bitumen and oilpaint

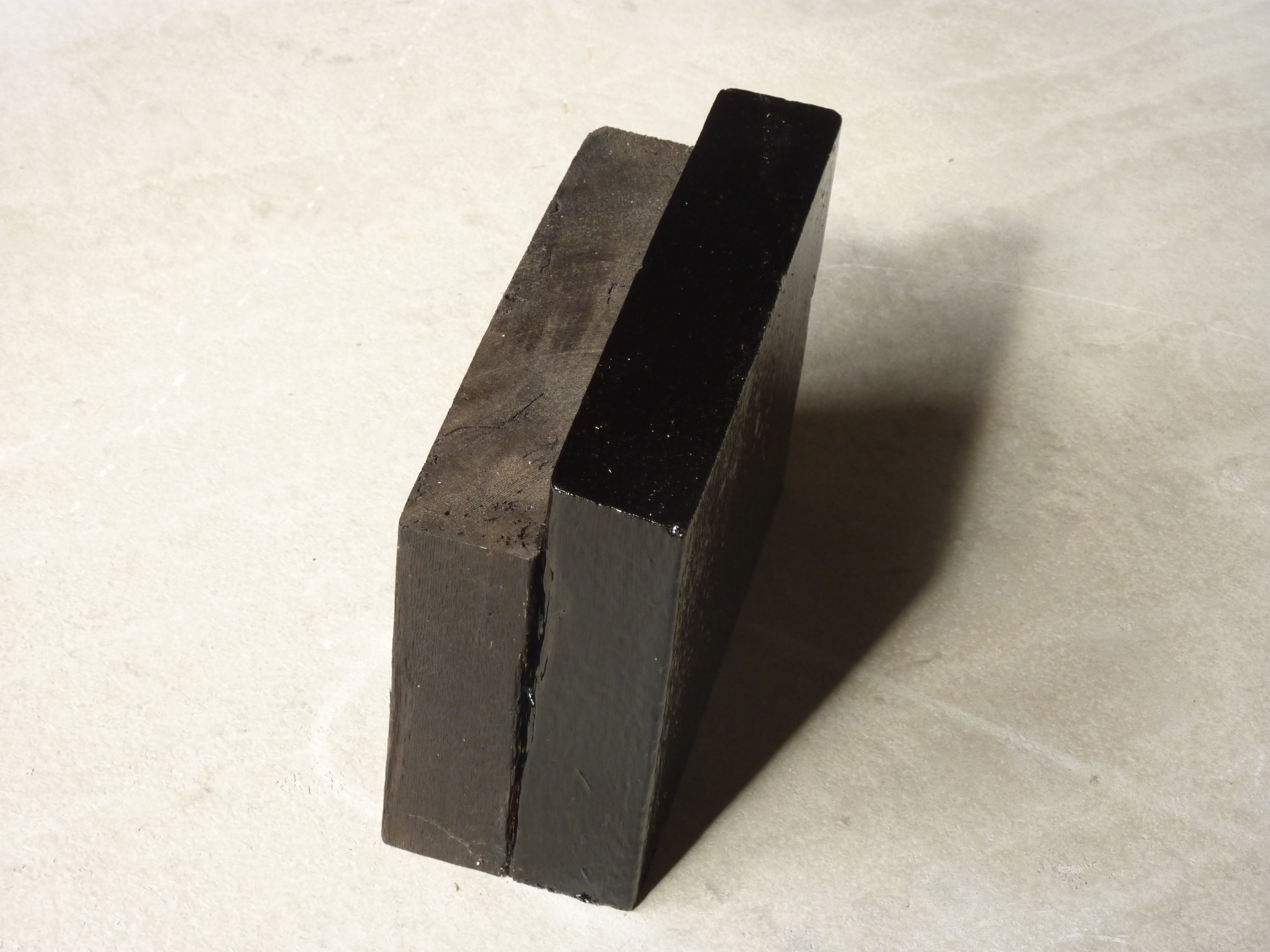
Das Bestehen und Nichtbestehen von Sachverhalten ist die Wirklichkeit, 2012 Object: wood bitumen and oilpaint

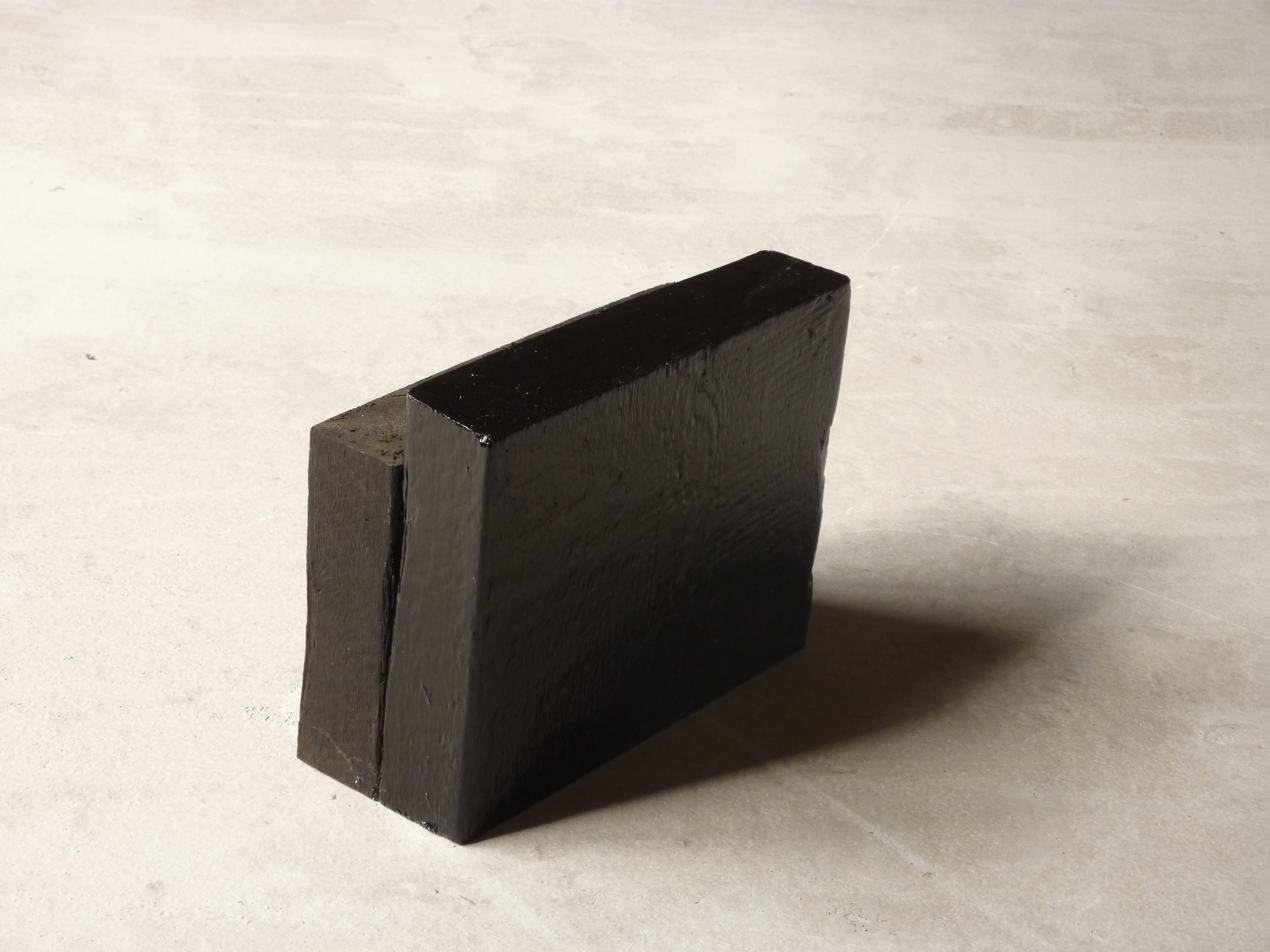
Das Bestehen und Nichtbestehen von Sachverhalten ist die Wirklichkeit, 2012 Object: wood bitumen and oilpaint
- Fleeting Memorials, 2012 – 2015

Pümpel's series of Fleeting Memorials are approximately square works on paper of different sizes measuring between about 30 x 33 cm and 46 x 43 cm. They comprise two sheets of Wenzhou paper and bear a ten-digit number and a date. The number refers to the number of human beings on earth at the time of completion of the work. The works are subject to visible change in the course of time. Thanks to the materials used, the paper and the colours darken in the first twenty, thirty years. The paper will start to become brittle until, after a hundred years or so, it will perhaps disintegrate. The processes cannot be calculated precisely as they depend on environmental factors relating to the air, humidity and light

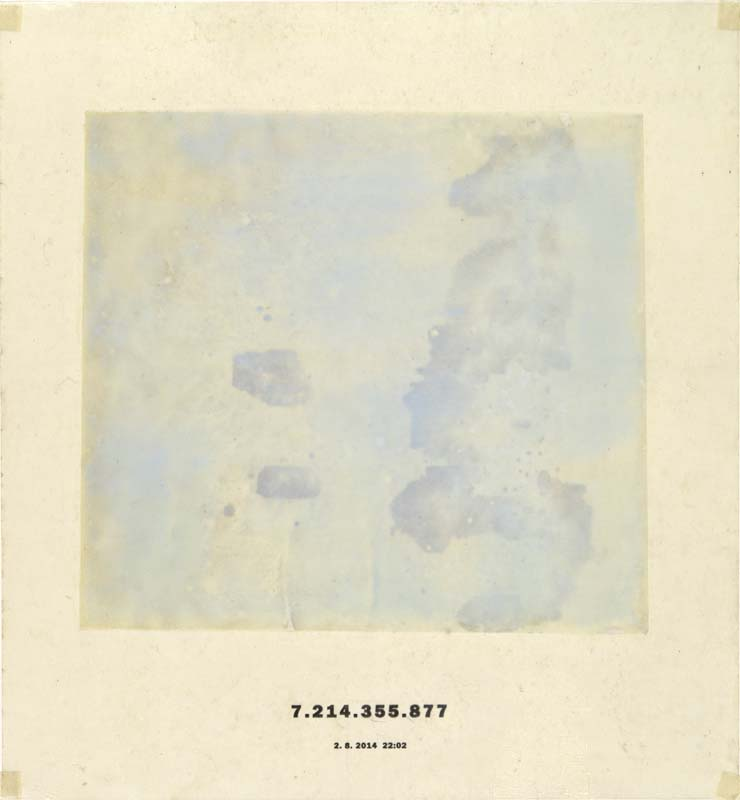
Fleeting Memorial 7.214.355.877, 2014 Inconstant work

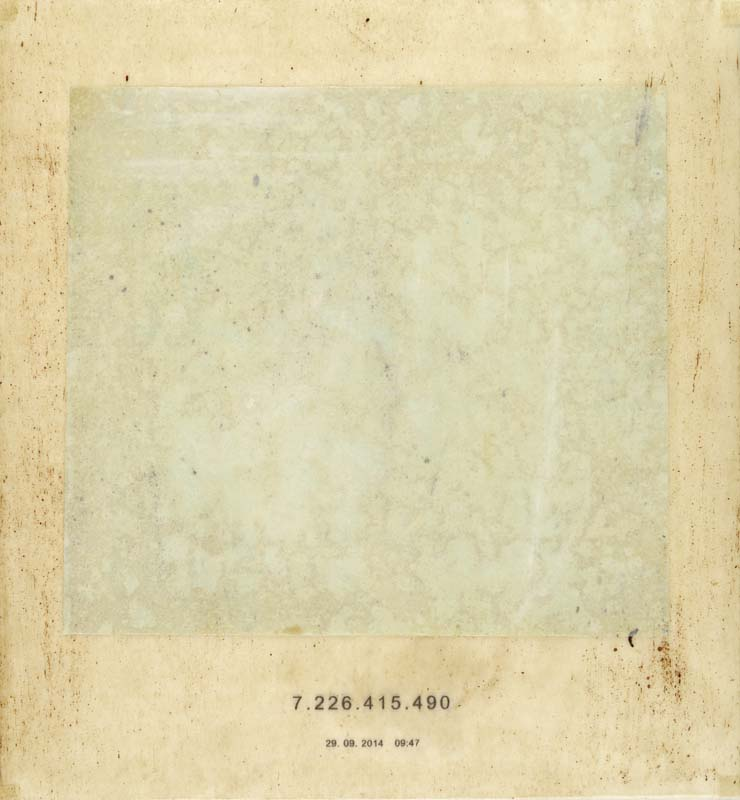
Fleeting Memorial 7.226.415.490, 2014 Inconstant work

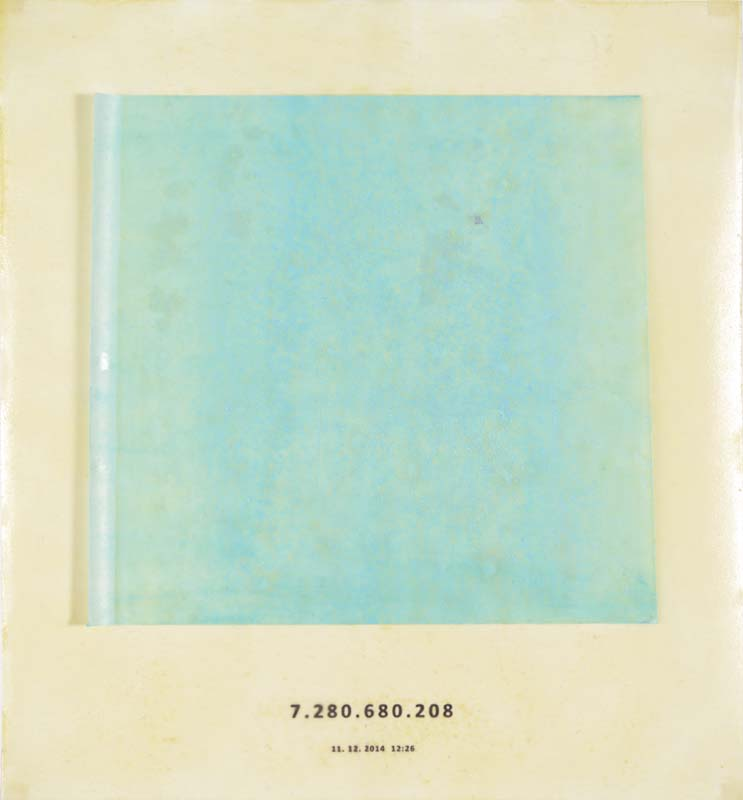
Fleeting Memorial 7.280.680.208, 2014 Inconstant work
- Condensates 2013 – 2015

Pümpel bases his latest series of works on thoughts on Bose-Einstein condensation: the unorthodox behavioural pattern displayed by matter in an ultra-cold state. At such temperatures, quantum effects can for the first time be observed on a macroscopic scale and described as a wave function. A discontinuous view of the world is replaced by a continuum of superfluid material in the form of an oscillation with no defined localisation. The artist's works describe states of probability in new aggregate states blurring all spatial structures and offering a liquid, fleeting, wave-dynamic image. (Harald Kimpel, Kassel 2013, translated by Chris Marsh)

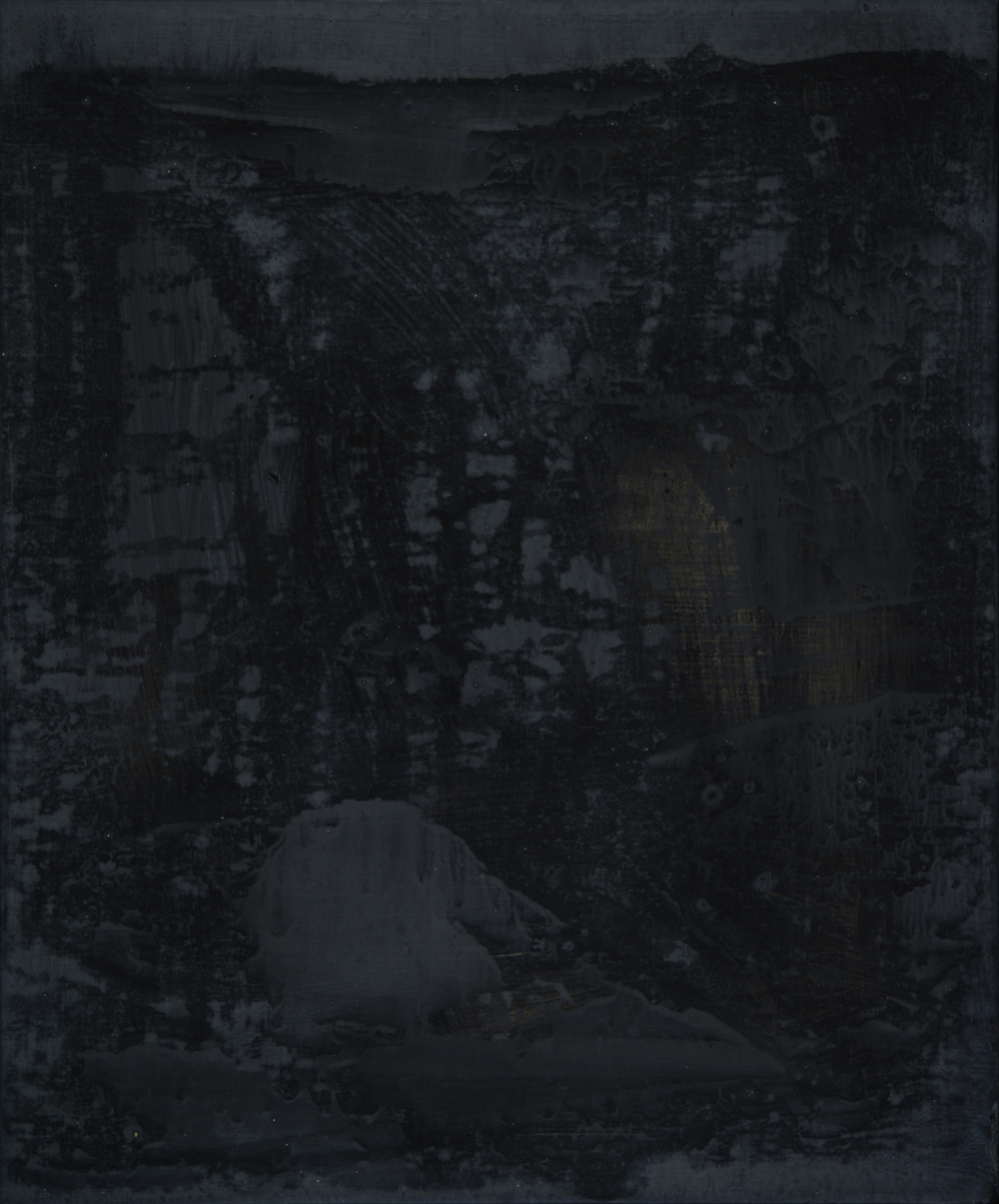
Condensate QLP 006, 2013 Oil and bitumen on canvas on wood,41 x 34 cm

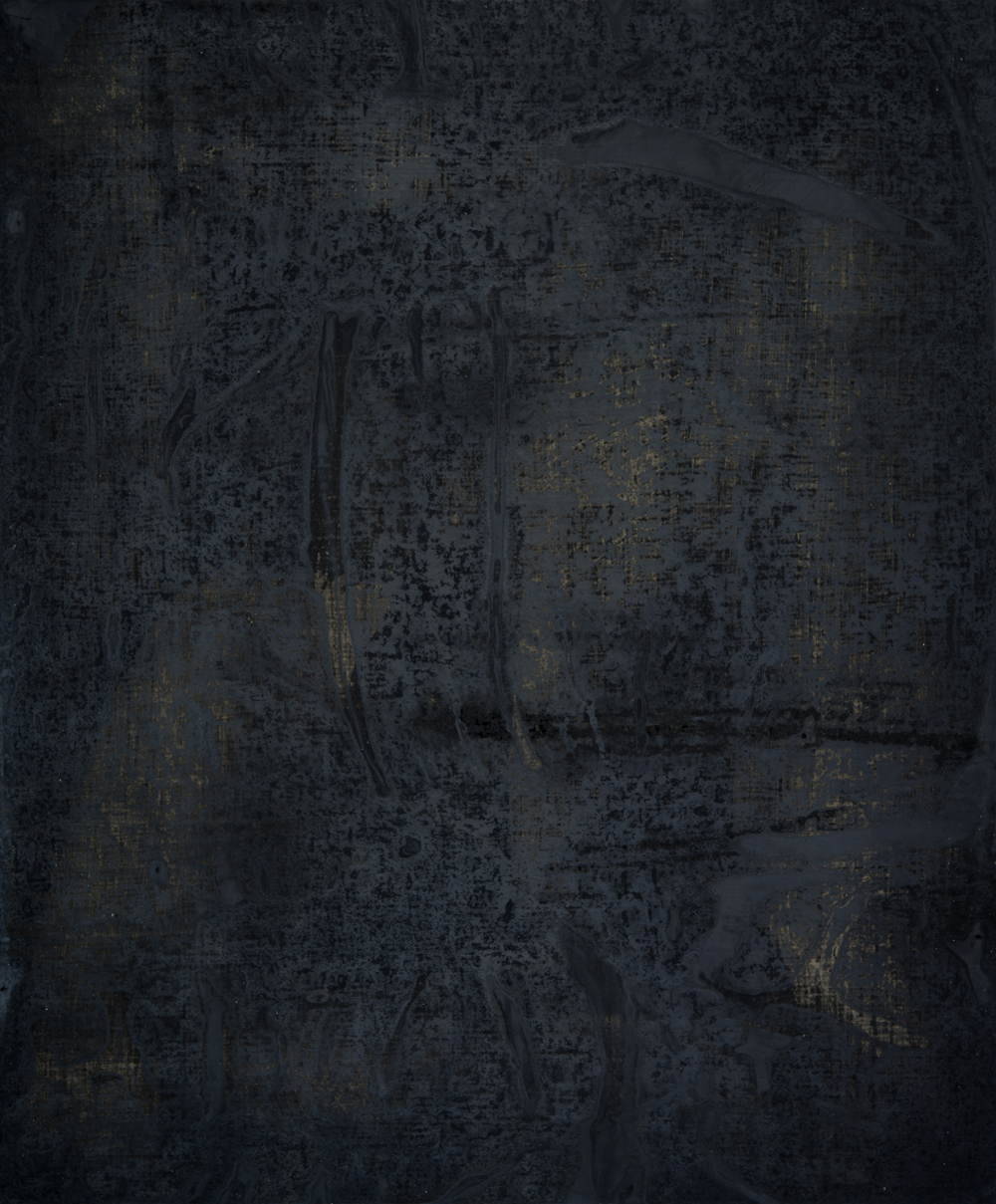
Condensate QLP 007, 2013 Oil and bitumen on canvas on wood,41 x 34 cm

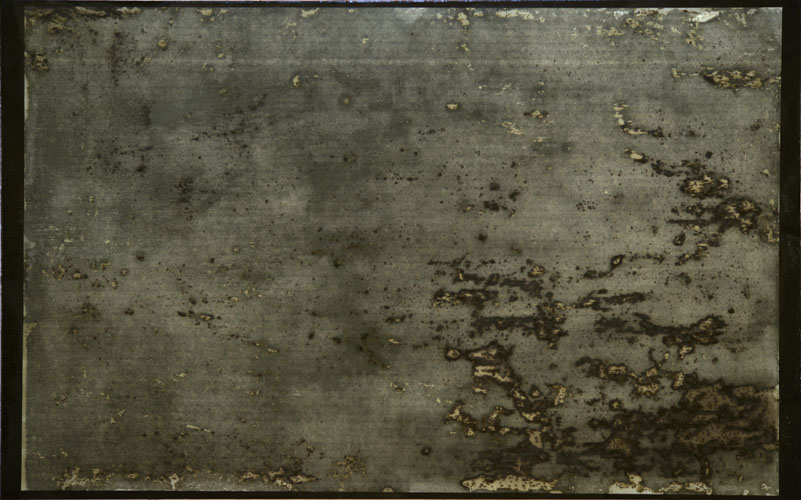
Condensate QLP 017, 2014 Oil, bitumen and Wenzhou paper on canvas on wood,110 x 160 cm
- Objects 2016 - 2017
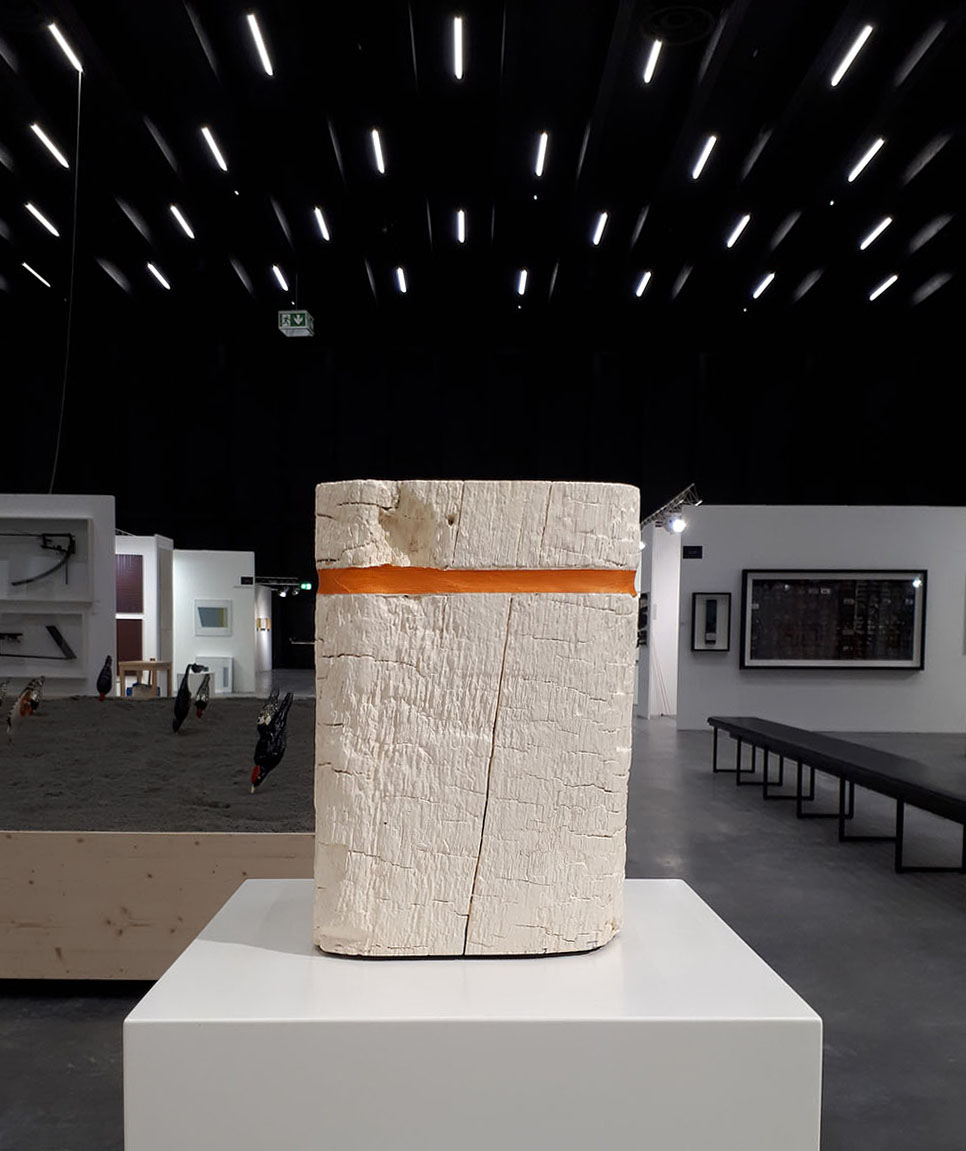
Objekt I 06, 2017

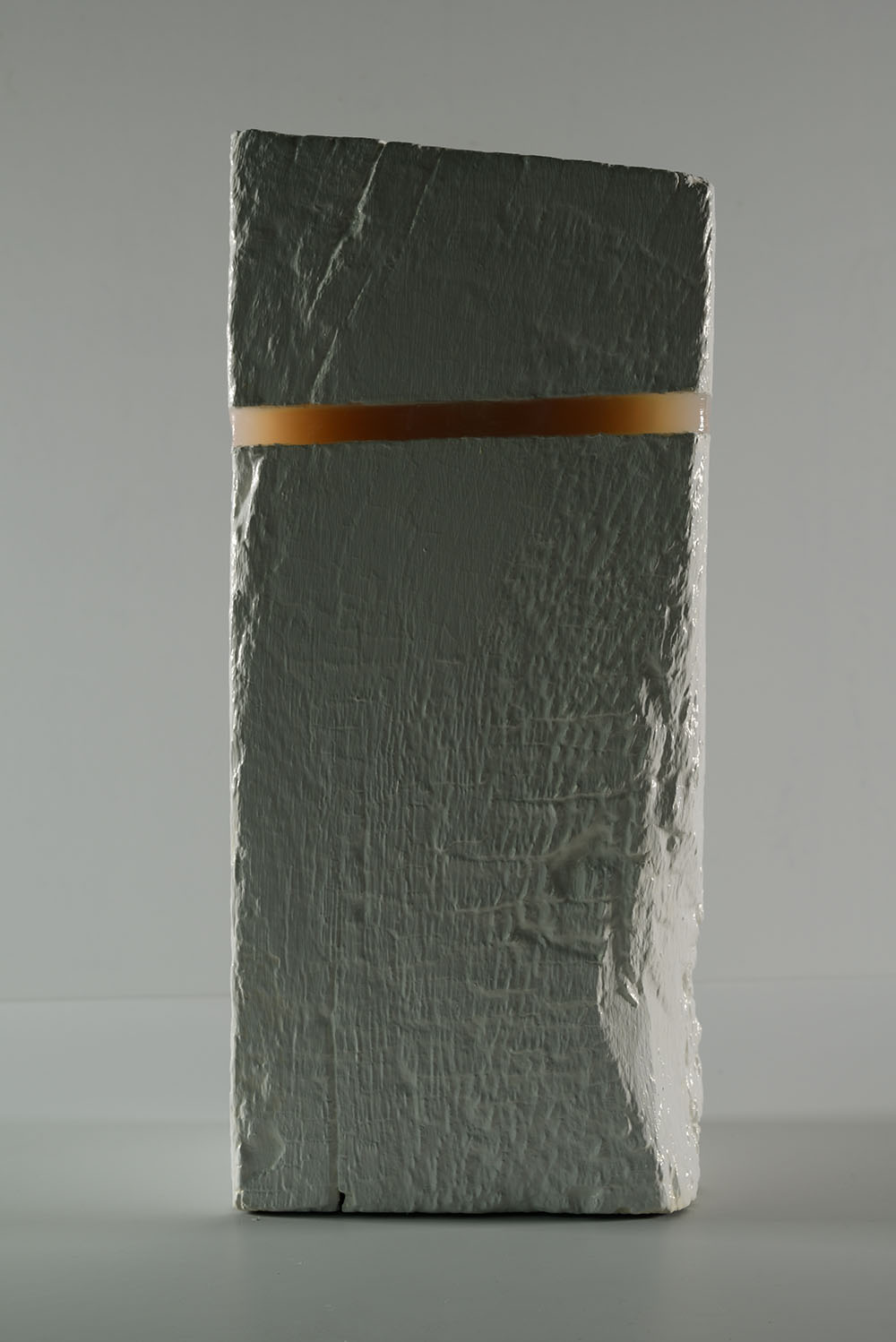
Objekt I 07, 2017

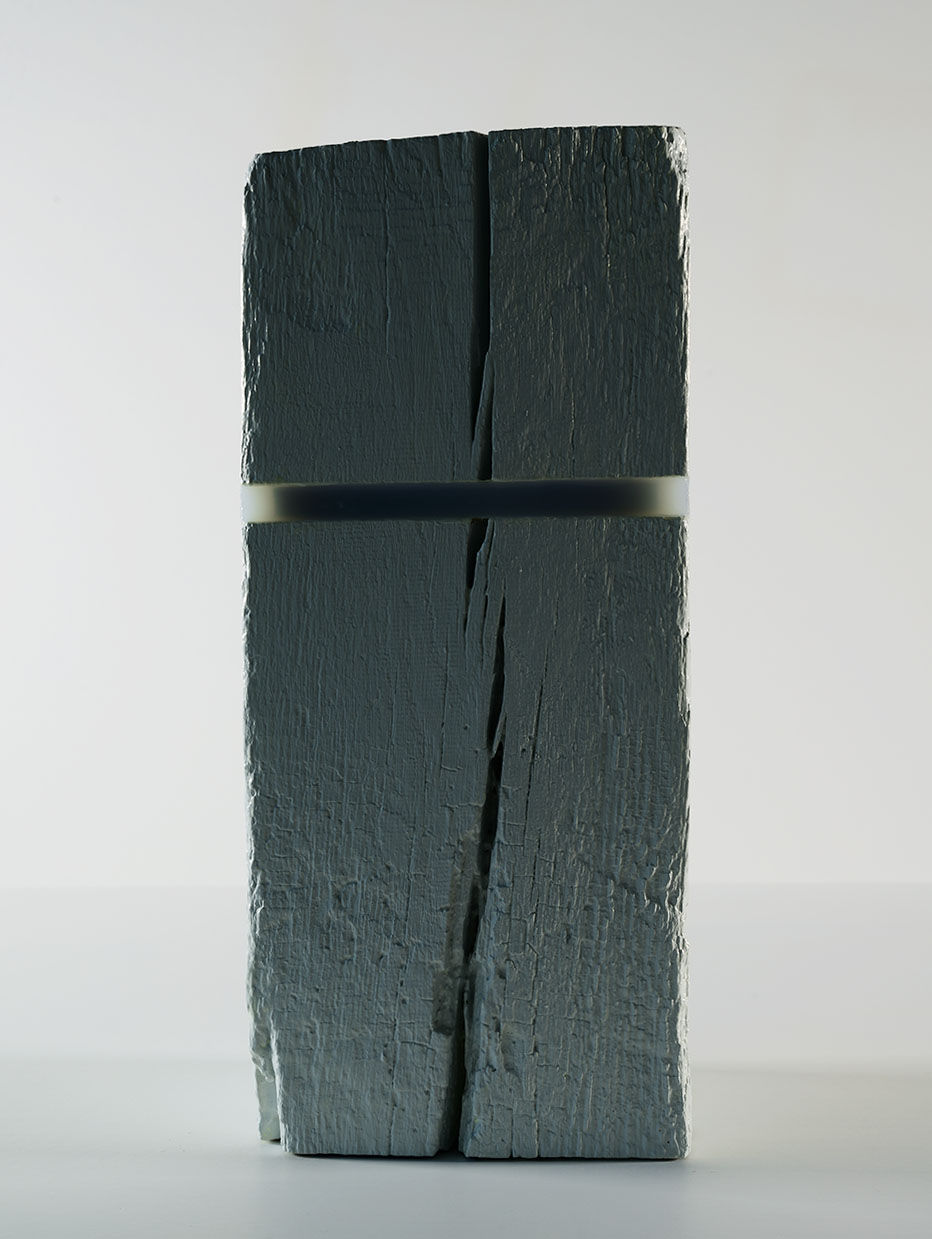
Objekt I 10, 2017

== Exhibitions ==
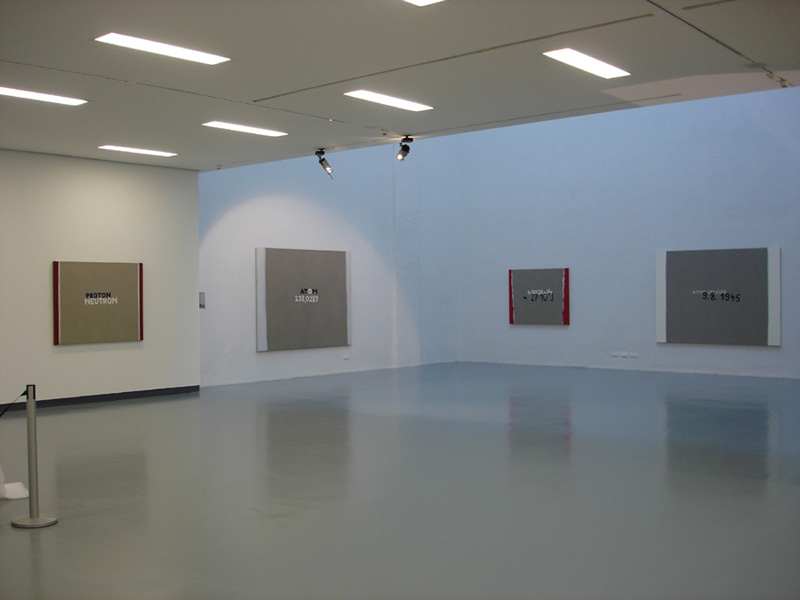
Norbert Pümpel, Exhibition View Museum Ferdinandeum Innsbruck, 2006

Since 1978 exhibitions in Europe, USA and Japan:

- 1979 Europa 79, Stuttgart, Germany. Curated by Hans-Jürgen Müller, Ursula Schurr and Max Hetzler, with Tony Cragg, Sandro Chia, Francesco Clemente and others
- 1984 Orwell und die Gegenwart, Museum of the 20th Century in Vienna/A, with Jochen Gerz, Jörg Immendorff, Robert Morris, Roy Lichtenstein and others; (Katalog)
- 1985 Wahrscheinliche Bilder, First one man museum exhibition in the State and Municipal Art Collections, the Bellevue Palace, Kassel, Germany.
- 1992 Concept Space, Shibukawa, Japan
- 1993 Die Vertikale Gefahr. Der Luftkrieg in der Kunst, Kassel documenta Halle, with Günther Uecker, Gerhard Richter, Arnulf Rainer and others;
- 1996 Dies ist kein Bild, Galerie St. Barbara Osterfestival Innsbruck/A
- 1997 Entgegen – religion.gedächtnis.körper, Graz, with Anish Kapoor, Roman Opalka, Joseph Beuys;
- 1999 Objective and Observed Files, Concept Space, Shibukawa, Japan
- 2002 Micro Stills, Concept Space, Shibukawa, Japan
- 2003 Sharjah Art Museum and Expo Centre, Sharja/ Unites Arab Emirates, 6th International Art Biennial, in Sharjah, United Arab Emirates
- 2005 Probability Statement to Guernica in the Late 20th Century, Tiroler Landesmuseum Ferdinandeum, Innsbruck (Austria)
- 2006 SCIENTIFIC DISASTER – The Hiroshima and Nagasaki Paintings, Tiroler Landesmuseum Ferdinandeum, Innsbruck (Austria)
- 2007 Zona Ovest, Biblioteca National, Turin/Italy with Lois and Franziska Weinberger, Peter Kogler, Elmar Trenkwalder, Flatz, Gottfried Bechtold and others. Curator: Christoph Bertsch, (catalog),
- 2011 Schädelstätten Hamlet Syndrom, Marburg/Germany, Kunstverein, curated by Harald Kimpel
- 2011 No-one in Paradise, Imst Städtische Galerie Theodor von Hörmann
- 2012 Realität und Abstraktion 2. Konkrete und reduktive Tendenzen ab 1990, Museum Liaunig, Neuhaus/Suha (Austria)
- 2012: Accrochage, Galerie Lindner, Vienna, Austria (a.o. with Susanne Ackermann, Roger Ackling, John M. Armleder, Hellmut Bruch, Max Bühlmann, Max Cole, Inge Dick, Bruno Erdmann, Doris Fend, Gerhard Frömel, Heinz Gappmayr, Ludwig Gerstacker, Hans Jörg Glattfelder, Hans Grosch, István Haász, Toshiya Kobayashi, Andrea Maria Krenn, Josef Linschinger, Dóra Maurer, Helga Philipp, Michael Post, Reinhard Roy, Pavel Rudolf, Franz Türtscher, Wolfram Ullrich, Maria Vill, Shawn Wallis, Peter Willen)
- 2013 Von der Fläche zum Raum, Museum Liaunig, Neuhaus/Suha (Austria)
- 2013 Unbestimmtes Land, Galerie Rhomberg, Innsbruck
- 2014 Acht ohne Gegenstand, with Hubert Lampert, Tone Fink, Franz Türtscher and others, Otten Kunstraum, Hohenems (A)
- 2014 art@science, with Ingrid Hermentin and Ulysses Belz, Marburger Kunstverein, Marburg(D)
- 2016 Augen-Blicke, Neuerwerbungen, Museum Liaunig, Neuhaus/Suha (Austria)
- 2016 Man kann auch ganz burleske Fälle konstruieren..., Künstlerhaus Palais Thurn und Taxis, Bregenz (Austria)
- 2016 Fleeting Memorials, Bildraum 01, Vienna (Austria)
- 2017 Out of Silence, Concept Space and Concept Space R2, with Atsuo Hukuda. First time the Fleeting Memorials are shown in Japan
- 2017 Modell der Wirklichkeit, Kunstraum Pettneu (Austria)
- 2018/2019 Innsbruck, Kunstraum, Wir deuten sie also, und sehen sie, wie wir sie deuten!
- 2019/2020 Innsbruck, Tiroler Landesmuseum Ferdinandeum, Schönheit vor Weisheit – Das Wissen der Kunst, die Kunst der Wissenschaft
- 2020/2021 Dornbirn, VAI Vorarlberger Architekturinstitut Konstruktion Explosion Asche
- 2021 Neuhaus/Suha, Museum Liaunig Tour de Force - Punkt, Linie, Farbe auf dem Weg durch die österreichische Kunst nach 1945

== Honours ==
- Austria : Decoration of Honour in Gold for Services to the Republic of Austria (2010)
- Ehrenkreuz des Landes Tirol (2016)

== Publications ==
Zum Werk von Norbert Pümpel erschienen zahlreiche Kataloge und Publikationen, darunter

- Harald Kimpel (Hrsg.) Hamlet Syndrom Schädelstätten. Ausstellungskatalog, Jonas Verlag, 2011, ISBN 978-3-89445-454-8
- Silvia Höller (Hrsg.) Begegnungen. Dialoge. Einblicke. Ausstellungskatalog, Haymon Verlag, 2011, ISBN 978-3-85218-716-7
- Elisabeth Walde (Hrsg.) Bildmagie und Brunnensturz. Visuelle Kommunikation von der klassischen Antike bis zur aktuellen medialen Kriegsberichterstattung, Studienverlag, 2009, ISBN 978-3-7065-4686-7
- Paul Naredi-Rainer, Lukas Madersbacher (Hrsg.) Kunst in Tirol: Band 2 Vom Barock bis in die Gegenwart, Tyrolia Verlag, 2007, ISBN 978-3-7022-2775-3, Athesia Verlag, 2007, ISBN 978-88-8266-332-2
- Christoph Bertsch, Zona Ovest: Ausstellungskatalog, Skarabäus Studienverlag, 2007, ISBN 978-3-7082-3224-9
- Christoph Bertsch (Hrsg.) Kraftwerk peripher. Kraftwerk Kunst, Ausstellungskatalog, Edizioni Medizea, 2004, ISBN 88-900171-7-1; Skarabäus Studienverlag, 2004, ISBN 3-7082-3160-0
- Norbert Pümpel, micro stills: Ausstellungskatalog, Concept Space Shibukawa Japan, 2002
- Silvia Eiblmayr, Thomas Feuerstein, Variable Stücke: Strukturen. Referenzen. Algorithmen, Triton Verlag, 2002, ISBN 3-85486-138-9
- Christoph Bertsch, Collezione Tirolo: Ausstellungskatalog, (in Italian) Edizioni Medicea, 1998, ISBN 88-900171-2-0
- Silvie Aigner, Peter Baum, Realität und Abstraktion 2 Konkrete und reduktive Tendenzen ab 1980, Museum Liaunig, Neuhaus/Suha, 2012 ISBN 978-3-9502610-9-7
- Harald Kimpel (Hrsg.) art@science, Jonasverlag Marburg, 2014, ISBN 978-3-89445-501-9
- Peter Baum, Elisabeth Wassertheurer, Sammlungskatalog II, Museum Liaunig, Neuhaus/Suha, 2015 ISBN 978-3-9503505-4-8
- Peter Baum, Augen-Blicke, Neuerwerbungen, Museum Liaunig, Neuhaus/Suha, 2016 ISBN 978-3-9503505-8-6
- Christoph Bertsch, Rosanna Dematté, Claudia Mark, Helena Perena, Schönheit vor Weisheit, Das Wissen der Kunst, die Kunst der Wissenschaft, Haymon Verlag, 2019 ISBN 978-3-7099-3472-2
- Sybille Moser-Ernst, Chrietoph Bertsch, Kunst::Wissenschaft, University Press Innsbruck, 2019 ISBN 978-3-903187-72-6
- Günther Holler-Schuster, Peter Liaunig, Tour de Force - Punkt, Linie, Farbe auf dem Weg durch die österreichische Kunst nach 1945, Neuhaus 2021 ISBN 978-3-9519931-3-3
