= Max Edler von Poosch =

Austrian painter (1872–1968)

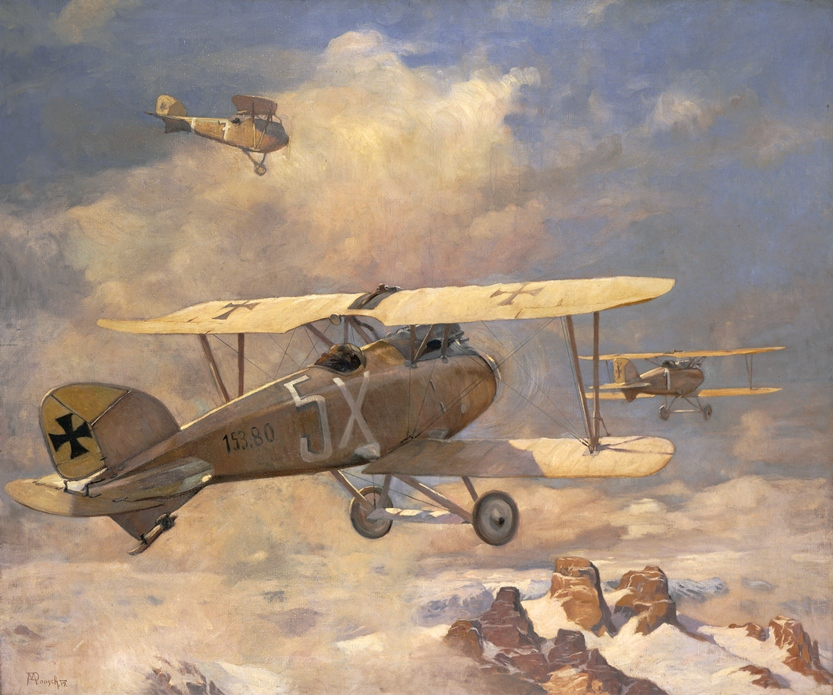
Kampfstaffel D3, über der Brenta-Gruppe

Max Edler von Poosch-Gablenz (1872–1968) was an Austrian painter and a war artist during the First World War (1914–18). His Kampfstaffel D3, über der Brenta-Gruppe (Squadron over the Brenta) from 1917, and now in the Heeresgeschichtliches Museum, "can be seen as the archetype of aviation painting as it proliferated all over Europe" during and after the war. It gives a strong illusion of height, but is excessive in its attention to detail.
