= Horst Widmann =

Austrian painter (born 1938)

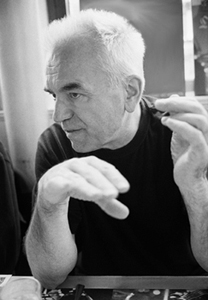
- Born: 8 August 1938 (age 87); Leoben, Austria
- Education: School of Art in Linz, Austria
- Known for: Painting

Horst Widmann (born 8 August 1938 in Leoben, Austria) is an Austrian painter.

== Biography ==
Between 1959 and 1963, he studied art in Linz, Austria. Since 1964, he has lived and worked in Paris. A part of his work, since 1982, is based on X-rays.

== Exhibitions ==
- 2013 - FRED TORRES COLLABORATIONS "Mon Ami" - We Share the Same Sky. New York (USA).
- 2011 - BALT'ART - Art and The "Grand Paris" at "Pavillon Baltard".
- 2010 - TRANSVERSALITE, Saint-Jean-de-Monts.
- 2010 - COP'ART in Lorraine.
- 2009 - F.A.E gallery, Boulogne.
- 2009 - JBS gallery, Paris.
- 2009 - Gallery Villa, Paris.
- 2008 - MACparis, Manifestation of Contemporary Art in Paris.
- 2005 - 50e Salon d'art contemporain de Montrouge
- 1992 - Bibliothèque nationale de France, “De Bonnard à Baselitz”.

== Notes and references ==
- in "Artension" - N°107 p. 16/17. (May–June 2010). COP'ART : l'art entre dans les entreprises.
- in "Art scènes" - N°21 p. 14/15. (September 2009).
- in "Connaissance des Arts" - N°665 événements, p. 20. (November 2008).
