= Anton Filkuka =

Austrian painter (1888–1957)

Anton Filkuka (April 30, 1888 – February 4, 1957) was a Viennese landscape, portrait and genre painter. He was a member of the professional association of Austrian artists.

== Biography ==
Fikulka's father was a financial accountant and court clerk at the court of the German Emperor, his mother came from a German aristocratic family. The family had three children, two daughters and a son. Although Filkukas father had reservations about his son's desire to study art and become a painter, he fully supported his son‘s artistic goals.

Filkuka received artistic training at the Vienna Academy of Fine Arts (1904–1913) under Sigmund L'Allemand and Christian Griepenkerl and at the master schools of Heinrich von Angeli and Kasimir Pochwalski.

Already at the end of his studies, Filkuka was able to celebrate his first successes and he knew how to position himself in Viennese society.

Filkuka was married to Magdalena Filkuka (nee Unger), with whom he had a daughter named Eva Maria. Magdalena Filkuka was an actress and worked as a model for Gustav Klimt and Egon Schiele. During the First World War, Anton Filkuka worked as a war painter at various locations.

After the end of the First World War he mostly lived and worked in Altaussee, where Filkuka was brought by his friend, the Austrian composer Wilhelm Kienzl.

Filkuka's reputation and ability, but also good contacts within the public interested in art, enabled him and his family to make a respectable living from his art even in the difficult times between the world wars.

After the end of World War II, Filkuka received work assignments from representatives of the American occupying power and was invited to the USA by the High Commissioner and later US Ambassador, Walter J. Donnelly. This was followed by stays abroad and assignments in the USA and Egypt, among others. Furthermore, Filkuka was even offered to emigrate to the USA, which he refused because he did not want to leave his home country out of solidarity.

Filkuka died on February 4, 1957, and was buried in the Vienna Central Cemetery.

== Works ==
The works of Filkuka can largely be assigned to poetic realism. Filkuka achieved particular fame through his traditional landscape paintings from Austria, which impressively characterize and reflect the play of colors of mountain landscapes and light. Scenes from the genre painting of the rural environment also have a special place in Filkuka's works. In his time, Filkuka mainly exhibited in the Vienna Künstlerhaus and in the house of the Albrecht Dürer Association, of which he was a member.

In addition, Filkuka established himself as a sought-after portrait painter from the 1920s. There are portraits of Ignaz Seipel, Wilhelm Kienzl, Alma Mahler or Braj Kumar Nehru and the princely family of Liechtenstein (1950).

In the early 1950s, Filkuka was also active as a painter abroad. During a state visit, Filkuka portrayed Egypt's first president, General Muhammad Nagib, and his family, created landscape studies and an exhibition on his behalf, and designed a poster for the construction of the Suez Canal.

Filkuka's entire oeuvre comprises an estimated 1000 paintings and many more drawings.

His works, partly private, partly public, can be found in the collections of the Austrian National Library, the Central Bank of Austria, the Museum of Military History and the Austrian Gallery Belvedere, but also on an international level such as in galleries and museums in Geneva, New York, Stockholm, Düsseldorf or Cairo these days.

== Awards ==
- Gundel-Prize
- Golden Albrecht-Dürer-Medal
- Speedwell City of Vienna
- Professor title City of Vienna
