= Robert Schöller =

Robert Schöller (also: Schoeller), (born 1950 in Austria) is a painter living in Clearwater, Florida, as of 2010.

== Biography ==
At the age of three, Robert Schöller discovered art through his mother's paintings and was encouraged to paint when his mother gave him a book with pictures of the world's great paintings. He still claims to consider that book his personal "bible" of art.

Finishing high school at age 15, Schoeller was accepted into an art school in Linz, in order to pursue university-level instruction in preparation for a career in art. He nevertheless focused on creating a personal style of paintings and engravings, combining realism with fantasy, and soon was quite successful with his work.

When applying to the Vienna's Academy of Fine Arts in 1968, he showed up at the interview with only two etchings which he had to borrow back from clients, and eventually was told to go and paint on his own because there was not much to teach him, but, he also was invited to join a master's class.

One year later, Schöller left this school for going on a trip to Mexico City, Los Angeles and New York City, where he set up a studio and resided for nearly four years.

Schöller moved back to Salzburg, Austria, in 1974, where he stayed for two years. On New Year's Day 1976, he moved to Vienna, setting up another studio, continuing painting and doing exhibitions throughout Europe.

As a painter, Schöller was always interested in expressing some ‘living essence’ of human beings, depicting emotions, attitudes, and moods rather than sheer faces.

Researching various masters' techniques for using oils and resins to create paintings that would stand the test of time, he emerged with innovative new techniques and a refined approach. When Schöller's reputation as a portraitist grew, he got commissions throughout Europe, painting government officials as well as members of the aristocracy, and getting commissions in the USA. In 1986, he was asked by The White House to paint the official portrait of George Washington to commemorate the Bicentennial Celebration of the U.S. Constitution. This painting was made into a poster and was used in local celebrations throughout the country. After that project, Schöller moved to Clearwater, FL, in 1989.

== Education ==
- 1965–1969 University of Art - Linz, Austria
- 1969–1973 Academy of Fine Arts - Vienna, Austria
