= Aloys Zötl =

Austrian painter (1803–1887)

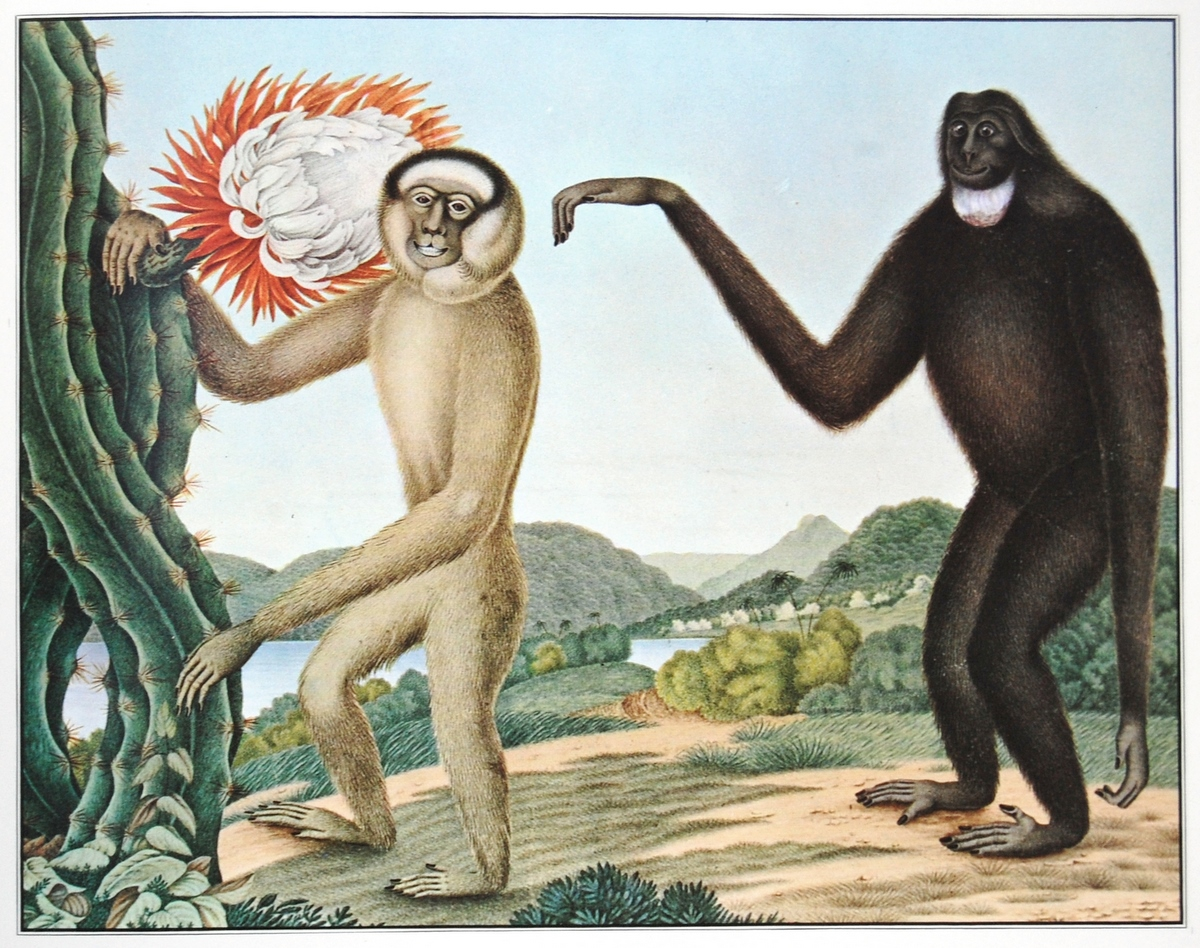
Watercolor from the "Bestiarium" (1835)

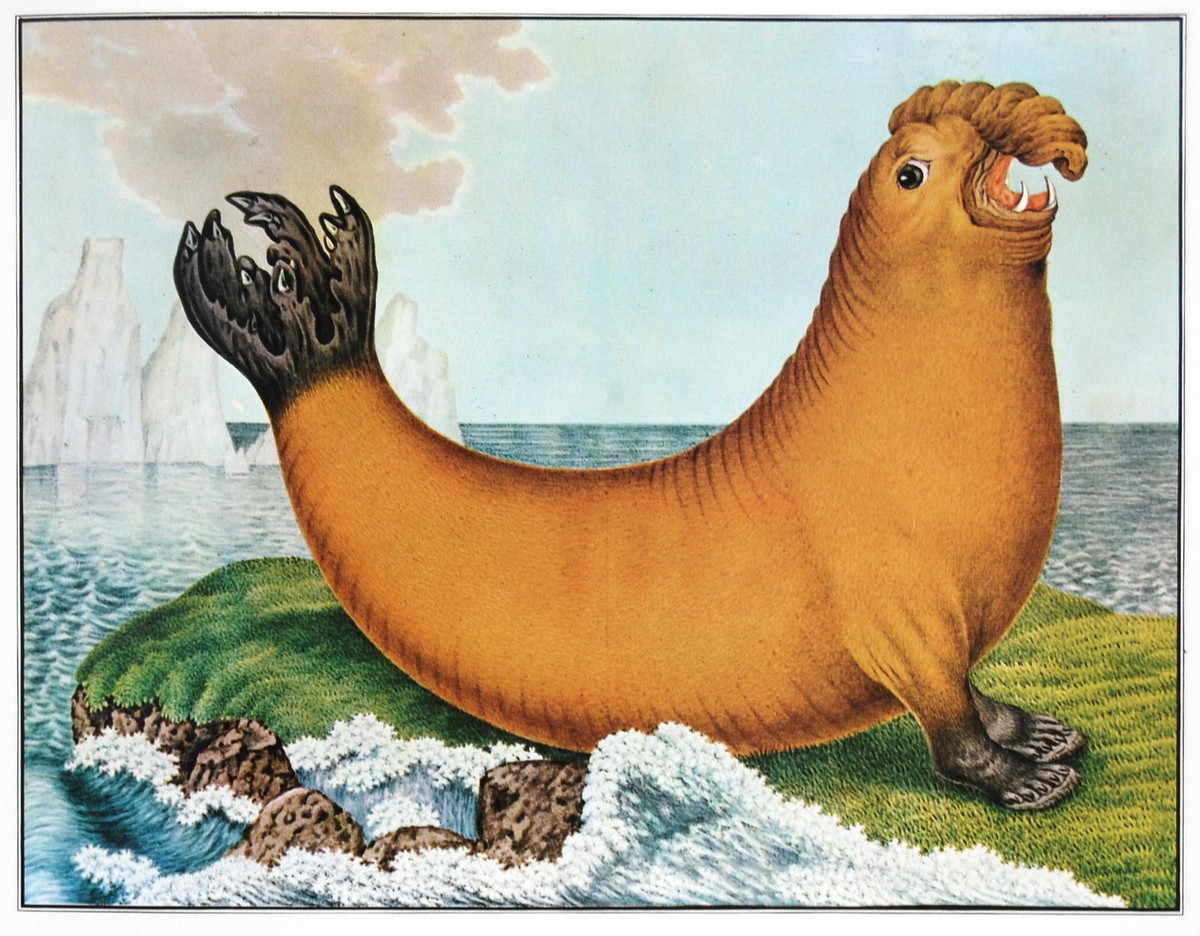
the elephant seal

Aloys Zötl (4 December 1803 – 21 October 1887) was an Austrian painter and master dyer.

== Biography ==
Aloys Zötl was born in Freistadt in Upper Austria. He is notable for his painting of fantastical animals and other natural history subjects. Decades after his death in 1887 in Eferding, Zötl's work was re-discovered by surrealist André Breton, who recognized a surrealist aesthetic in it. Breton wrote: "…Lacking any biographical details about the artist, one can only indulge one's fantasies in imagining the reasons which might have induced this workman from Upper Austria, a dyer by profession, to undertake so zealously between 1832 and 1887 the elaboration of the most sumptuous bestiary ever seen."
