= Georg Mader =

Austrian artist (1824–1881)

Georg Mader (September 9, 1824 – May 31, 1881) was an Austrian painter.

Mader was born in Steinach, Tyrol. He became a miller by profession, though aspired to art, and studied for two years under Hans Mader in Innsbruck. He soon returned to milling, but from 1844 dedicated himself fully to painting. He studied in Munich under Heinrich Maria von Hess, Wilhelm von Kaulbach, Frederik Storch, and Johann Schraudolph. From 1851 to 1853 he assisted Schraudolph in painting the frescoes of the Speyer Cathedral. He returned to Tyrol in 1853, but initially found little work, having to support himself with decorative painting. From 1858 however he was commissioned to paint various frescos in Tyrol, for churches in Bruneck, Steinach, Kematen, and Bad Ischl, while spending most of his winters back in Munich. He was also influential in the development of Austrian glass painting, helping to found the Tyrol Institute for Glass Painting in Innsbruck in 1861. He was a member of the Academy of Fine Arts Vienna from 1868, and died in 1881 in Bad Gastein.
