= Hans Kronberger =

Hans Kronberger may refer to:

- Hans Kronberger (physicist) (1920–1970), British physicist
- Hans Kronberger (politician) (1951–2018), former Austrian Member of the European Parliament
