= Johann Baptist Dallinger von Dalling =

Austrian painter (1782–1868)

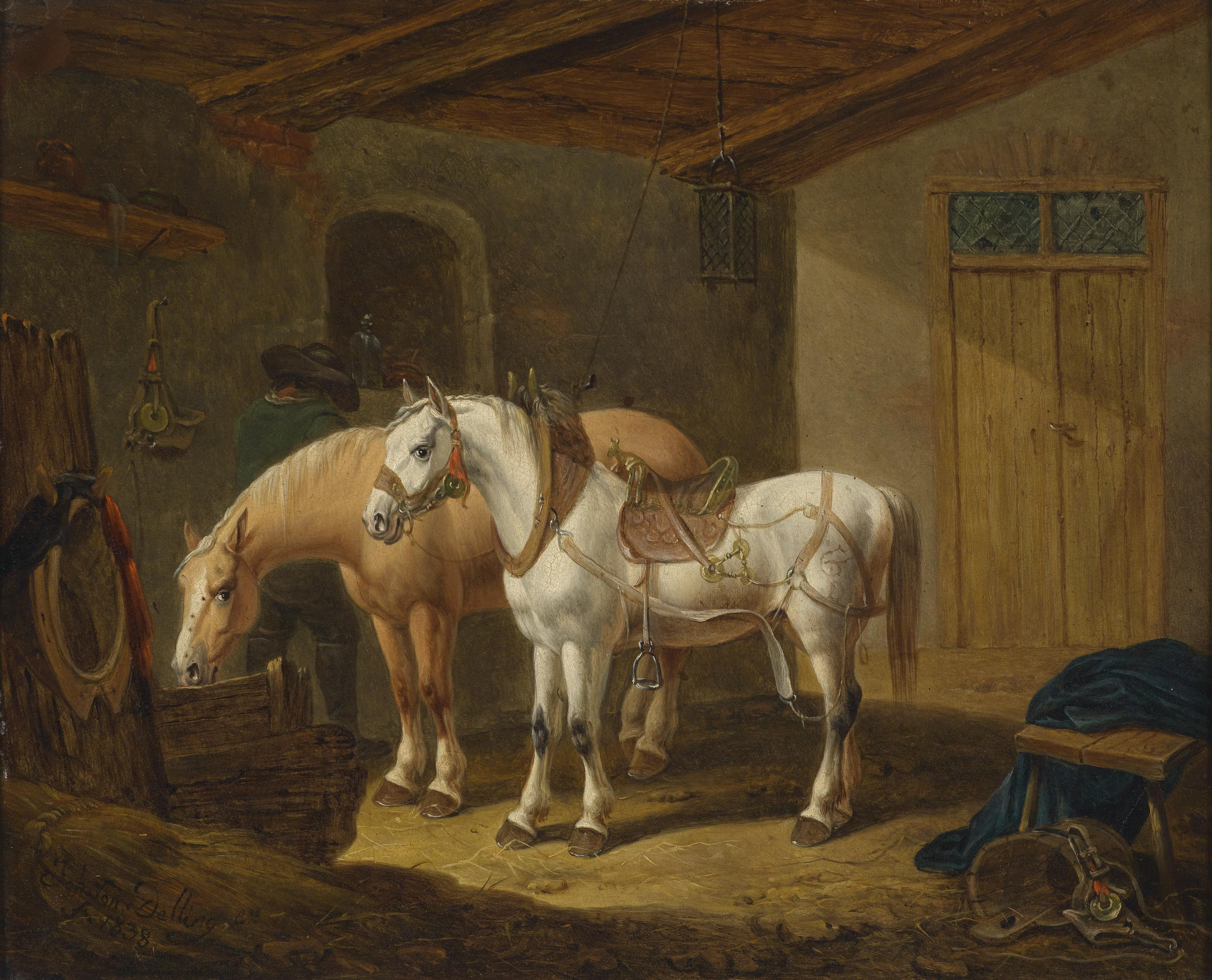
Horses in the Stable by Johann Baptist Dallinger von Dalling, Russian Museum, 1838

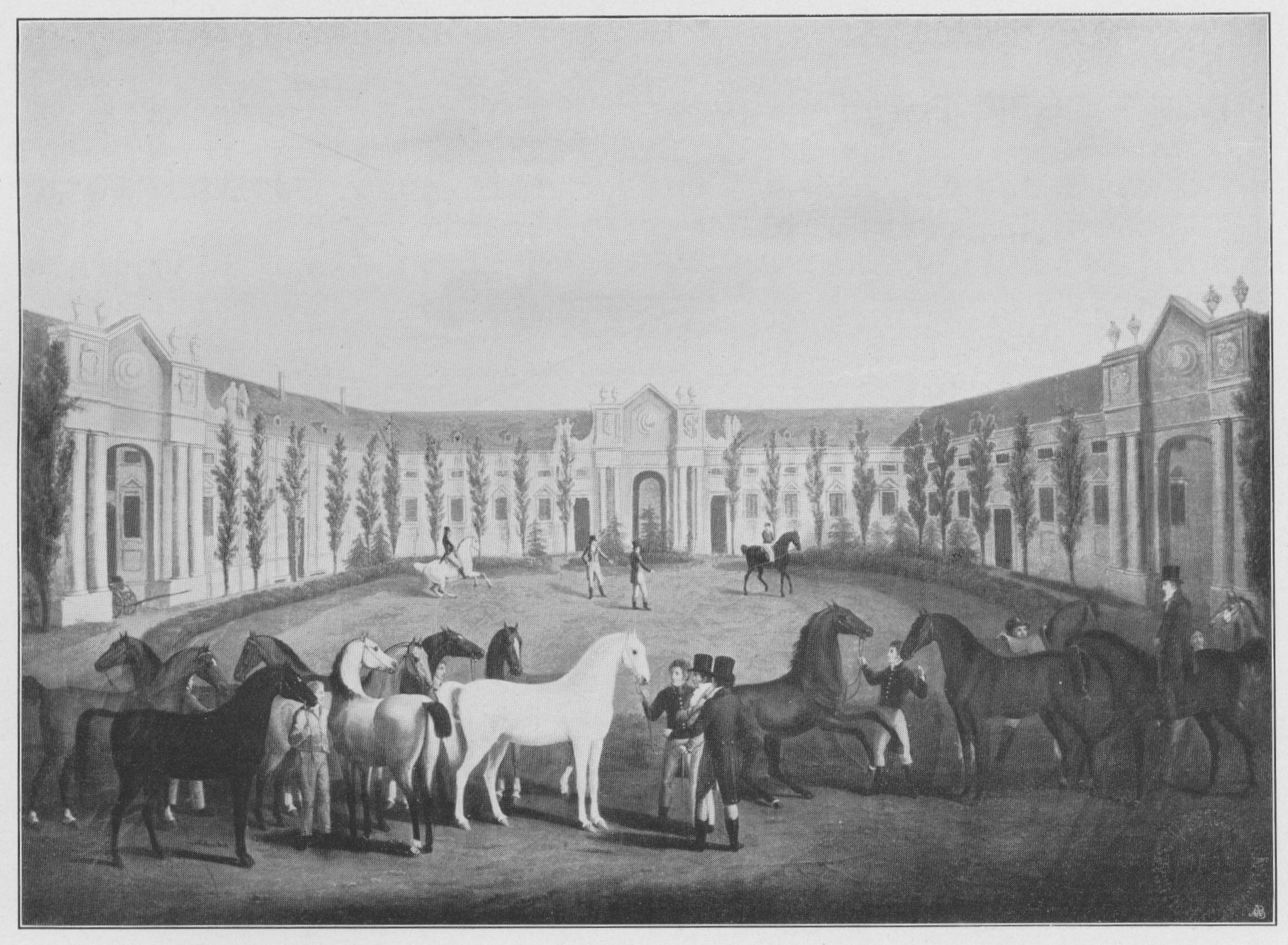
Riding school

Johann Baptist Dallinger von Dalling (1782–1868) was an Austrian painter.

A son of Johann Dallinger von Dalling, he was born in Vienna, and painted landscapes and animals in the old Dutch style, as well as portraits and conversation-pieces. Some of his works are in the Belvedere and Liechtenstein Galleries. He died at Vienna in 1868.
