= Carl Kronberger =

Austrian artist (1841–1921)

- Born: March 7, 1841; Freistadt, Upper Austria
- Died: October 27, 1921 (aged 80); Munich
- Occupation: painter

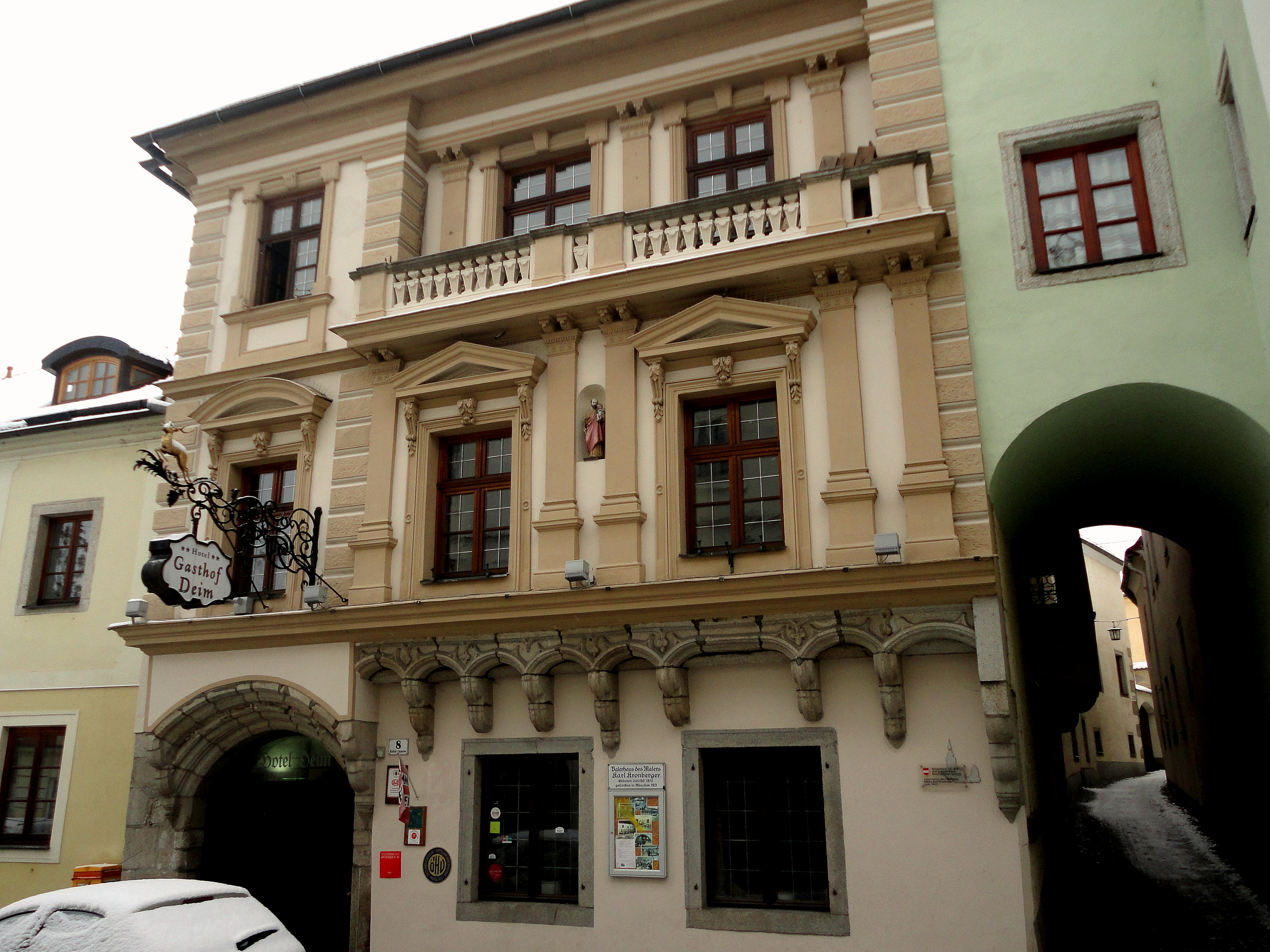
House in Freistadt where Kronberger was born as son of the landlord

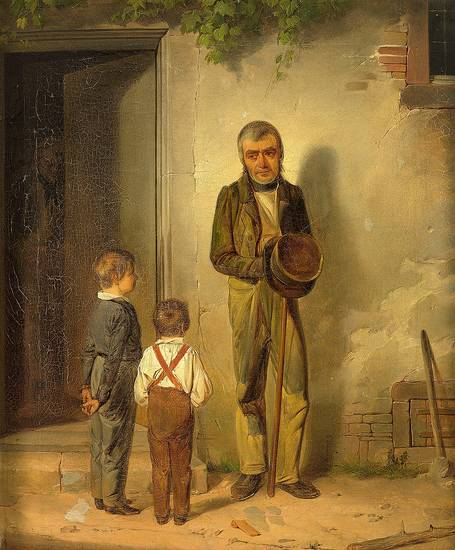
Beggar (by Carl Kronberger)

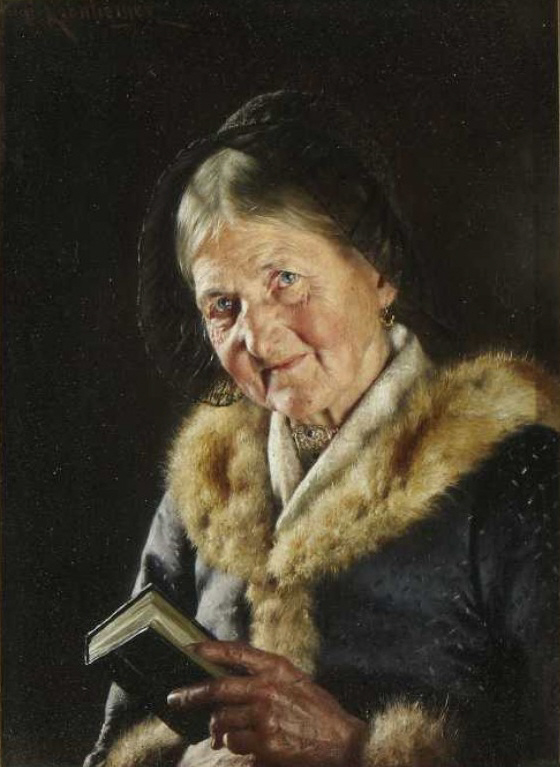
Old Farmer Woman with Prayer Book (by Carl Kronberger)

Carl Kronberger (or Karl Kronberger; March 7, 1841 – October 27, 1921) was an Austrian painter.

== Biography ==
Carl Kronberger was born in Freistadt, Upper Austria, on March 7, 1841. He was the son of a landlord. In 1869 he went to Munich and received his formal training with Hermann Dyck, Hermann Anschütz and Johann Georg Hiltensperger at the Academy of Munich. Here he perfected his ability to paint the human figure and began to specialize in portrait and genre painting. He was noted, during his lifetime, for finely detailed miniature portrait paintings often featuring the head of a Tyrolean gentleman. However, he also painted a number of ‘true’ genre paintings. He died in Munich in 1921.

== Work ==
During his lifetime he exhibited a number of works at the various exhibition-halls in Europe and won medals at exhibitions in Vienna (1873) and Munich (1901). Among his exhibited works were:

- Law Proceedings (1873)
- Last Will (1875)
- At the Baptismal Feast (1876)
- Aunt is Coming (1876)
- Theft Discovered too Late (1880).

== Sources ==
- Gallery Information by Rehs Galleries, Inc.
- Österreichisches Biographisches Lexikon 1815 - 1950, Band 4 (Lfg. 19, 1968), S. 291.
