= Alexander Johann Dallinger von Dalling =

Austrian painter (1783–1844)

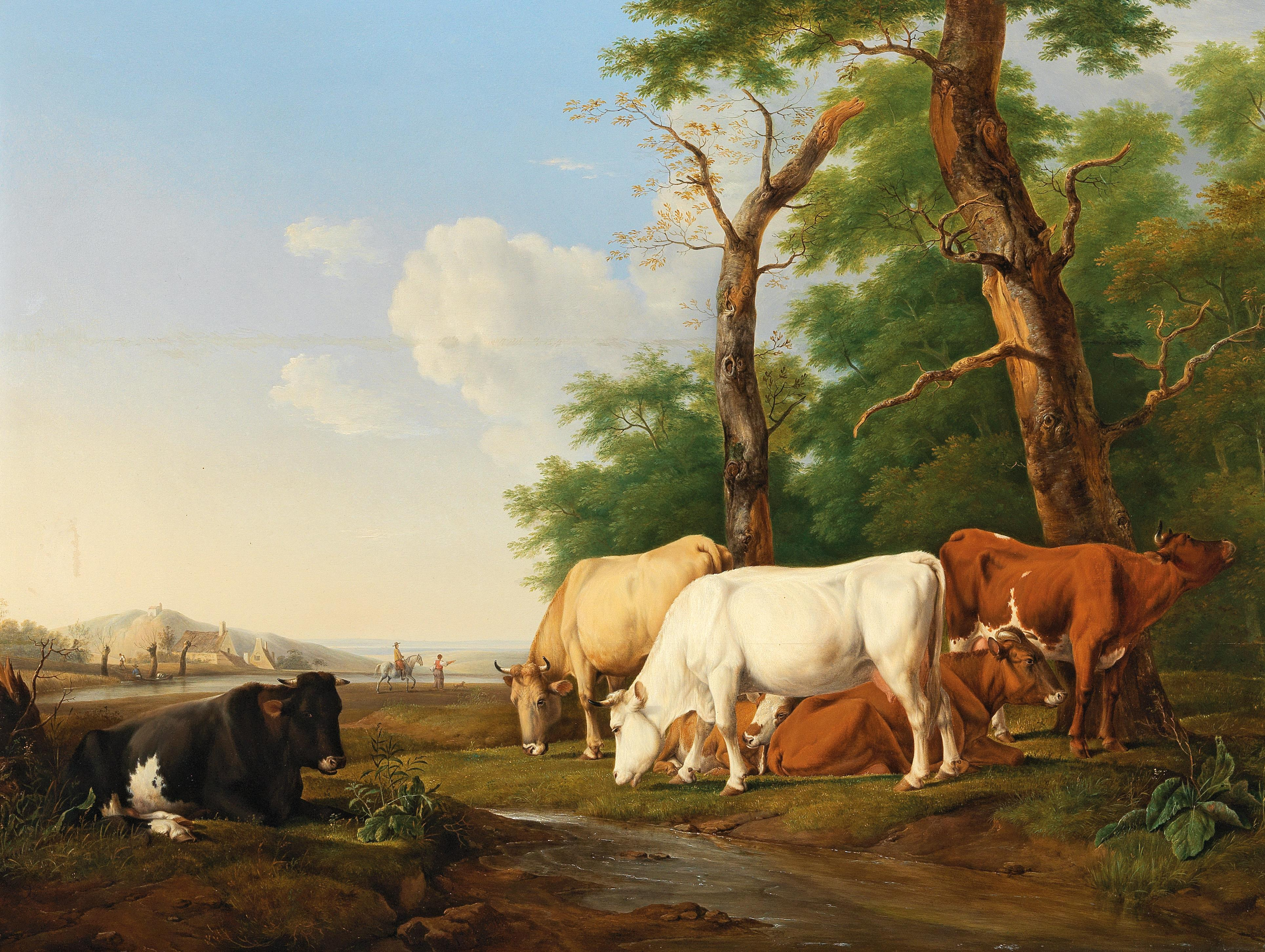
Cows in a meadow (oil on panel, 1832)

Alexander Johann Dallinger von Dalling (1 August 1783 – 1844) was a painter from the Austrian Empire. A son of Johann Dallinger von Dalling, the elder, he was born in Vienna. He studied under his father, and became a landscape and animal painter, as well as an engraver and a restorer of old pictures. In the Belvedere, at Vienna, there is a picture by him representing 'A Herdsman driving Cows across a Brook.' He died in Vienna in 1844.
