= Johann Dallinger von Dalling =

Austrian painter

Johann Dallinger von Dalling (1741–1806) was an Austrian painter born in Vienna. He distinguished himself as director of the Liechtenstein Gallery. He painted animals, historical subjects, and large altar-pieces, most of which are in Russia and Poland.
