= Julius Berger =

Julius Berger may refer to:

- Julius Berger (company), a Nigerian construction and real estate developer based in Abuja, FCT
- Julius Berger (cellist) (born 1954), German cellist and musicologist
- Julius Berger (rabbi) (1893–1953), Canadian rabbi
- Julius Victor Berger (1850–1902), Austrian painter
- Julius Berger FC, a football club of Julius Berger Nigeria PLC
- Julius Berger Tiefbau AG, a European company specialized in civil and industrial construction, engineering and services
- Julius Berger, a character in Outcasts

== See also ==
- Julius Bürger (1897–1995), Austrian-born American composer and conductor
