= Wilhelm Legler =

Austrian painter (1875–1951)

- Guglielmo Legler
- Wilhelm Legler
- Born: 3 April 1875; Pisino, Austria
- Died: 28 April 1951 (aged 76); Angern-Stillfried, near Vienna, Austria
- Education: Academy of Fine Arts Vienna
- Known for: Painting
- Movement: Art Nouveau
- Spouse: Margarethe Julie Schindler (m. 1900; div. 1917)
- Children: Wilhelm (Willy) Carl Emil Legler

Wilhelm Legler also Guglielmo Legler (3 April 1875 – 28 April 1951) was a painter from Pisino, Istria.

== Biography ==
Wilhelm Legler (also Guglielmo) was born in Pisino, Istria, to Wilhelm Legler, an engineer, and Adele Legler-Köhler (Koehler).

On 4 September 1900 he married Margarethe (Greta) Julie Schindler (1881-1942) in Bad Goisern, Austria. After their marriage they moved to Stuttgart. She was the daughter of Emil Jakob Schindler (though there are questions surrounding her paternity) and the sister of Alma Mahler. After Schindler's death, his wife, and Greta's mother, married Carl Moll (with whom she had been previously accused of having an affair). Moll then married Greta to Legler, one of his pupils. It has been also reported that Greta was forced to marry Legler by her mother. The marriage produced a child, Wilhelm (Willy) Carl Emil Legler (1902-1960), an architect. After a suicide attempt in December 1911, Margarethe was institutionalized for most of the rest of her life and the couple was divorced in 1917.

== Career ==
Legler was chiefly a landscape painter and an engraver. He studied from 1897 at the Academy of Fine Arts in Vienna with Carl Moll and then from 1899 to 1906 in Stuttgart with Robert Poetzelberger, Leopold von Kalckreuth and Adolf Hölzel as well as etching with Alexander Eckener.

From 1906 he worked mainly in Vienna and Linz, later also in Dimburg and Stillfried an der March. From December 1910 to January 1911 he exhibited at the Galerie Miethke, which had become "the primary outlet for the Klimt group". From 1929 he lived and worked mainly in Vienna, where he was a member of the Vienna Künstlerhaus from 1914.

During his time in Stuttgart he made numerous etchings, was artistically influenced by Carl Moll until about 1915, but then turned to landscape painting and mainly painted landscapes of the Marchfeld. His works were exhibited at the Kunstschau Wien 1908 and the 1909 International Art Show in Vienna.

In April 1945, during the Second World War, Legler's house in Vienna's Rainergasse 27 was destroyed by a bomb attack, along with his entire artistic work. In 1957 the Wilhelm-Legler-Gasse in Vienna was named after him.

His works can be found in the Albertina, Österreichische Galerie Belvedere and in the Lower Austria Museum in Sankt Pölten, among others.

== Gallery ==
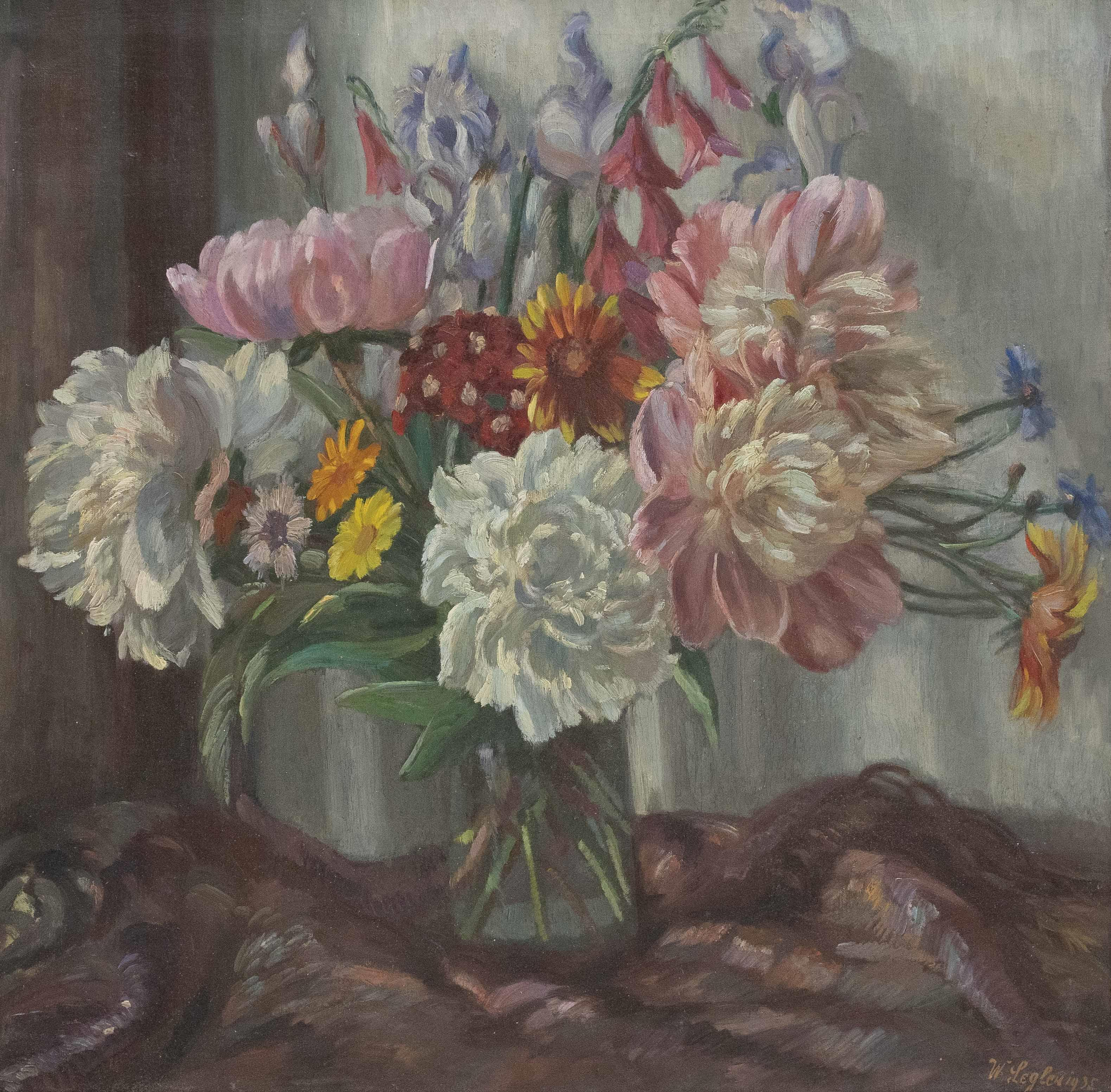
Still life with garden flowers, oil on canvas, 1935

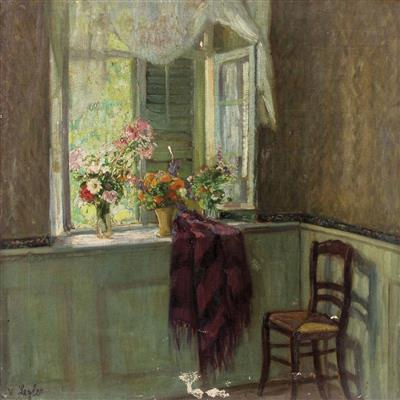
Interior with Floral Still Life

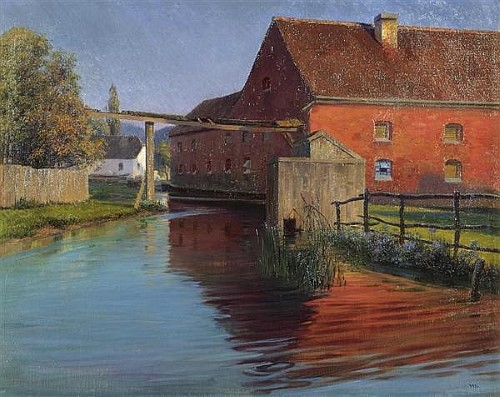
The Mill on the River

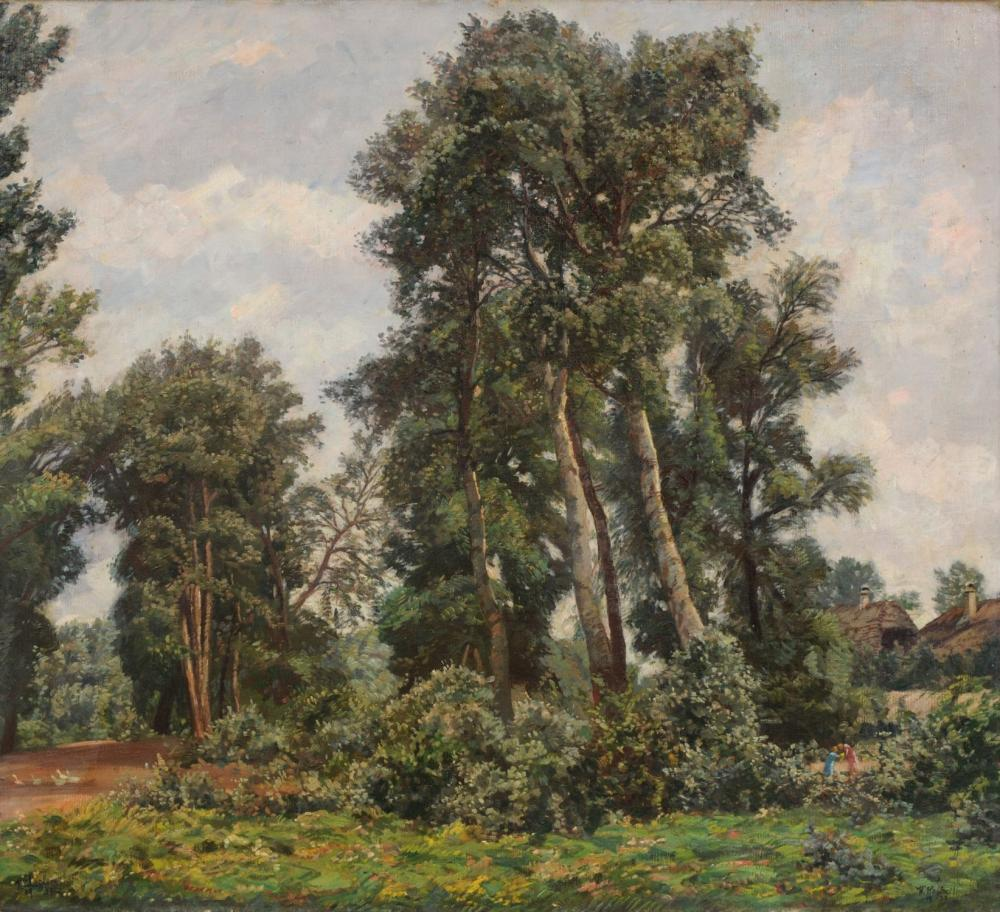
In Front of the Homestead, oil on canvas, 1937

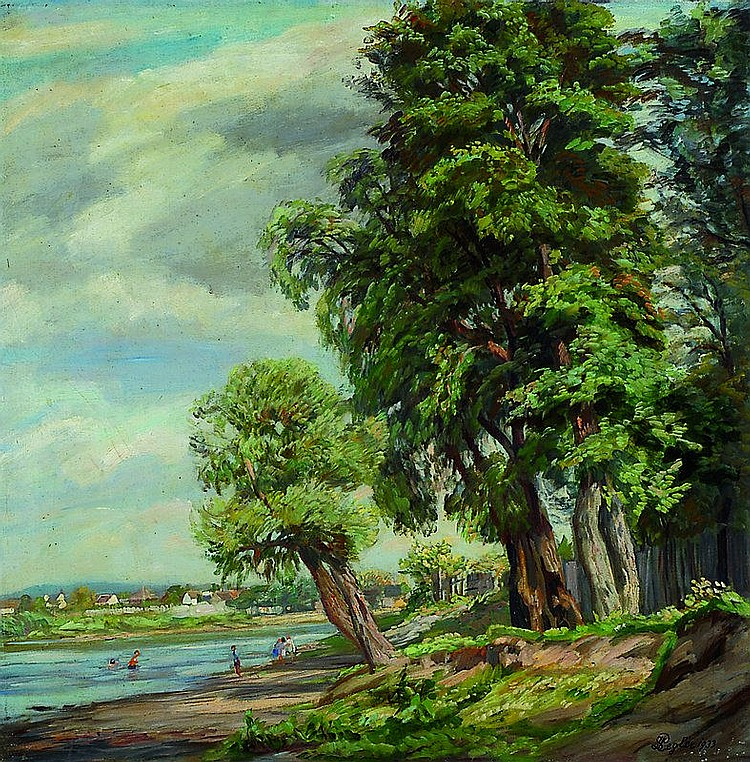
Bathers on the Morava, oil on canvas, 1933

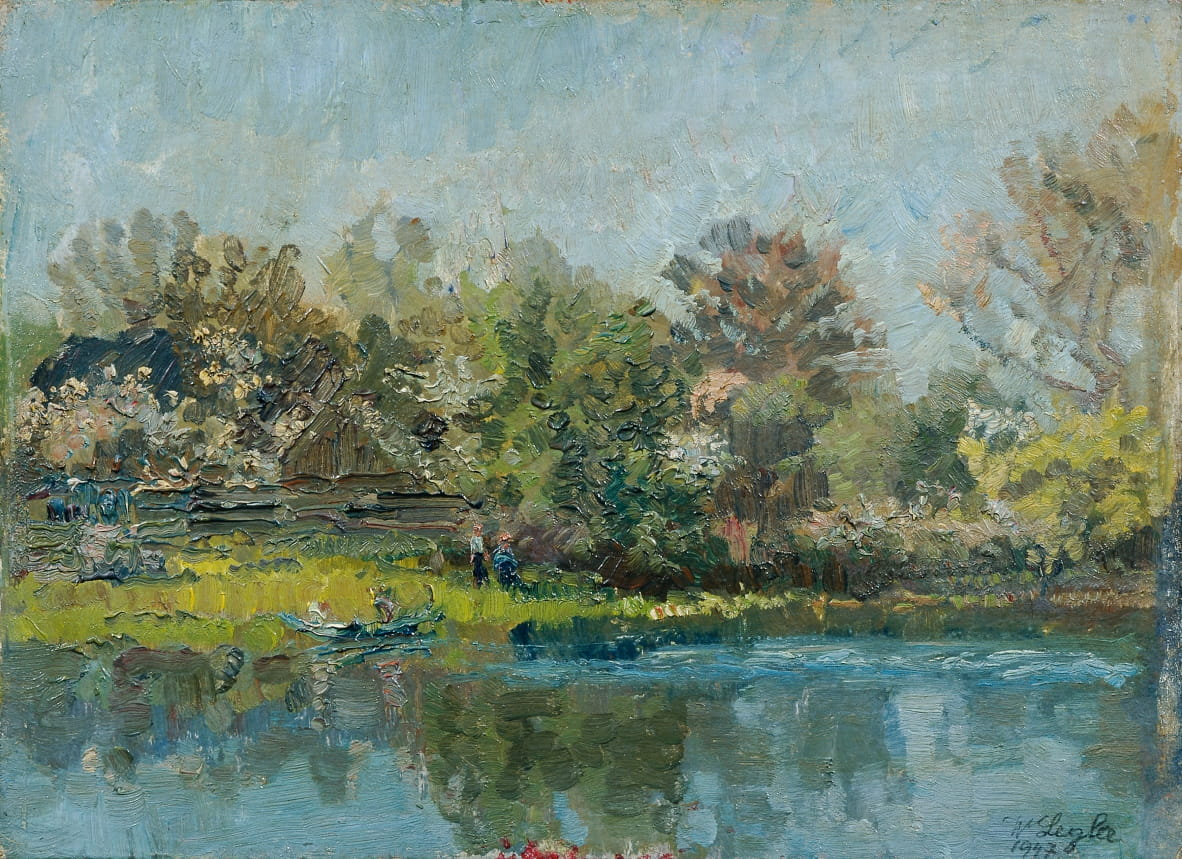
Old Danube
