= Leslie Hindman Auctioneers =

American auction house

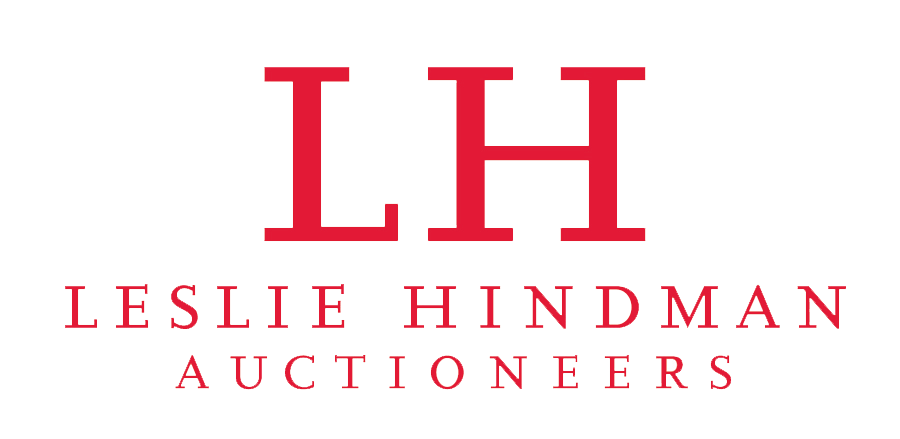
- Industry: Auctioneering
- Founded: Chicago, Illinois (1982)
- Founder: Leslie Hindman
- Headquarters: Chicago, Illinois, United States
- Key people: Leslie Hindman, President
- Products: Fine arts
- Website: HindmanAuctions.com

Leslie Hindman Auctioneers was an American auction house based in Chicago, Illinois, United States. Founded in 1982, sold to Sotheby's in 1997 and reopened in 2003, the company engages in auctions ranging from contemporary paintings and fine jewelry to French furniture and rare books and manuscripts.

Following a merger with Cincinnati-based Cowan's Auctions in 2019, the firm began operating under the name Hindman Auctions. In 2024, Hindman and Philadelphia-based auction house Freeman's merged to become Freeman's-Hindman.

== Company history ==
In 1982, Leslie Hindman founded her eponymous auction house in Chicago, Illinois, and within a few years it grew to be the largest auction house in the Midwest and the fifth largest in the country. The company conducted many significant and highly publicized auctions, including memorabilia from the historic Comiskey Park, the Chicago Stadium, the Schwinn Family Bicycle Collection, as well as the personal property from such renowned estates as Arthur Rubloff, Mrs. Robert R. McCormick, the Potter Palmer families, and Dole heiress Elizabeth F. Cheney.

In 1991, Hindman gained international recognition for the discovery of a previously unknown still life by Vincent van Gogh. The painting sold for $1.43 million.

Since reopening, it has handled property from the estates of Leo S. Guthman, Mrs. Jacob Baur (Bertha Baur), Rose Movius Palmer, Melville N. Rothchild, Sally Fairweather, Helen C. Tunison, Frank J. and Mary Mackey Jr., and Dr. Reid I. Martin among others. Additionally, Leslie Hindman Auctioneers has handled property belonging to Leona Helmsley, the Kenan Heise collection of books and manuscripts, property from the Akron Art Museum, The Art Institute of Chicago, The Milwaukee Art Museum, the Scottish Rite Bodies: Valley of Chicago, the Kmart art collection, the Kemper Insurance Companies corporate art collection, sports memorabilia from the legendary Ernie Harwell, music and movie memorabilia from Eric "Mancow" Muller, and the John Drury collection of A.C. Gilbert Erector Sets and Mysto Magic Sets.

In January 2024, Freeman’s Auction House in Philadelphia, merged with Hindman to form Freeman's-Hindman.

== Leslie Hindman biography ==
Hindman was raised in Hinsdale, Illinois. She attended Pine Manor College, studied at the University of Paris (Sorbonne), and later enrolled at Indiana University. After returning to Chicago, she worked in secretarial and administrative roles before joining Sotheby’s Chicago office in 1978 as an assistant, at age 23. She left her job and founded Leslie Hindman Auctioneers in 1982 She has also received an honorary Doctorate in Business Administration from Lincoln College in Lincoln, Illinois.

In December 2004, she served as Chairperson of the Great Chicago Fire Sale, the first-ever citywide eBay auction led by Commissioner Lois Weisberg and the Chicago Department of Cultural Affairs. The auction grossed over $240,000 which was used to support free programs at the Chicago Cultural Center, Gallery 37, the city's cultural grants and the Clarke House Museum.

Hindman serves on the Boards of the Chicago Public Library Foundation, the Goodman Theatre, Children's Memorial Foundation, the Arts Club of Chicago, and the Woman's Board of the Joffrey Ballet.
