= Angus Grossart =

Scottish businessman (1937–2022)

Sir Angus Grossart CBE
- Born: 6 April 1937; Camlachie, Glasgow, Scotland
- Died: 13 May 2022 (aged 85); Edinburgh, Scotland
- Education: University of Glasgow
- Occupation: Merchant banker
- Years active: 1969–2022
- Organization: Noble Grossart
- Spouse: Gay Thomson (m. 1978)
- Children: 1

Sir Angus McFarlane McLeod Grossart CBE (6 April 1937 – 13 May 2022) was a Scottish businessman who was the founder, chairman and executive director of Edinburgh-based merchant bank Noble Grossart.

== Background ==
Grossart was born in Camlachie, Glasgow on 6 April 1937, one of three sons to Mary and William Grossart. At the time of his birth, his family lived in Carluke, Lanarkshire. He was schooled at The Glasgow Academy. He proudly recalled honing his business skills at a Barrowlands stall selling reject toffee. As a young man, he displayed a talent for golf and was runner-up in the 1957 British youth championships. He studied law at the University of Glasgow and studied for the Scottish Bar in Edinburgh under James MacKay. He then worked in corporate tax law before cofounding the merchant bank Noble Grossart in 1969. In 1977, he purchased Pitcullo Castle, a 16th-century house that he restored over many years. In 1978, he married Gay Thomson with whom he had a daughter. He was appointed CBE in 1990 and was knighted in 1997.

Grossart died from a pulmonary embolism at his residence in Edinburgh, on 13 May 2022, aged 85. At the time of his death he was being treated for cancer.

== Career ==
Grossart cofounded the merchant bank Noble Grossart in 1969 with Sir Iain Noble, buying out Noble's share of the business two years later. The bank provided finance and advice to up-and-coming companies, its success aided by the emerging exploitation of oil in the North Sea. Noble Grossart provided backing to a number of Scottish businesses and entrepreneurs, including Pict Petroleum, an oil and gas exploration company, the Wood Group, a company proving services to the oil industry, Sir Tom Farmer, founder of the Kwik Fit chain of garages, Sir Brian Souter, founder of the Stagecoach Group of bus and rail operators, Benny Higgins, a banker with the Royal Bank of Scotland, and James Gulliver, founder of Argyll Foods. Grossart's initial investment of £30,000 grew into over £300 million. In June 2019 he received the majority of a £5.3 million dividend paid out by Noble Grossart.

Grossart was also vice-chairman of Royal Bank of Scotland from 1982 to 2005 and was appointed chairman of the Scottish Futures Trust in 2000. Other roles included chairman of the Scottish Investment Trust between 1975 and 2003, director at Murray International Holdings, chairman of Lyon & Turnbull, and he was on the boards of Scottish & Newcastle and Trinity Mirror and Alexander & Alexander, the insurance company.

His public roles included chairmanships of the National Galleries of Scotland, the National Museums of Scotland and the Burrell Renaissance group overseeing the refurbishment of the Burrell Collection building, and deputy chairman of the National Heritage Memorial Fund. He was also a trustee of the Heritage Lottery Fund and the Scottish Civic Trust, and a director of the Edinburgh International Film Festival and the Scottish National Orchestra.

== Awards ==
- Pushkin medal (2018) - presented by Vladimir Putin, returned in 2022.
