= Luise Begas-Parmentier =

German painter (1843–1920)

- Born: 15 April 1843; Vienna, Austria
- Died: 11 February 1920 (aged 76); Berlin, German
- Known for: Painting
- Spouse: Adalbert Begas (m. 1877–1888) (his death)

Luise Begas-Parmentier (1843–1920) was an Austrian-German landscape and architecture painter and Salonière.

== Life and work ==
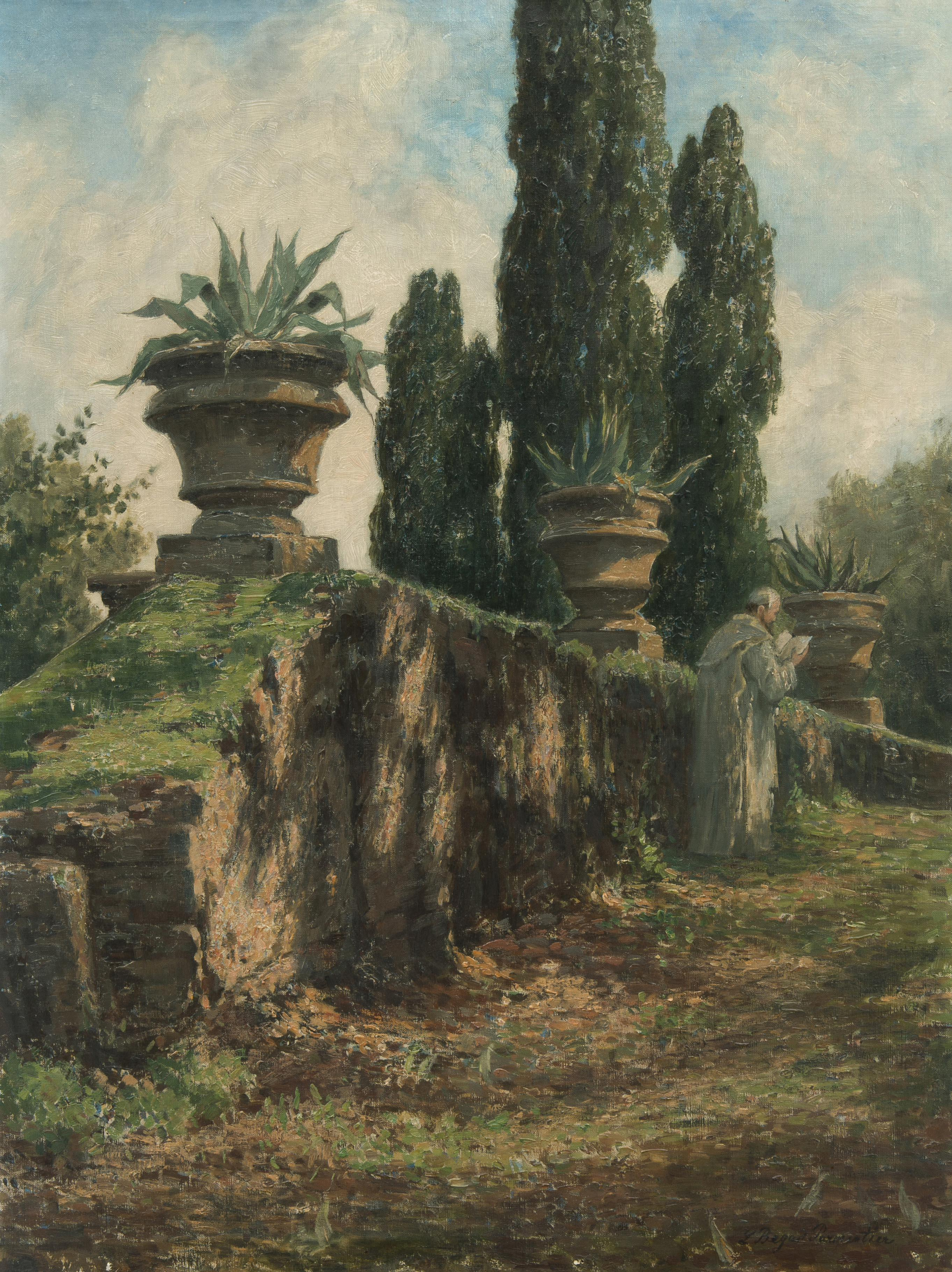
Scene at the Villa Torlonia in Frascati

Begas-Parmentier née Parmentier was born on 15 April 1843 in Vienna, Austria. Following the example of her sister Maria von Parmentier, she decided to become an artist. She received her first training with the landscape painter Emil Jakob Schindler and the etcher William Unger. By the age of twenty-two, she was exhibiting her works on rural themes at the Vienna Künstlerhaus. Around 1875, she began a series of study trips to Italy, focusing on Venice. After 1876, her Italian-themed paintings were a regular sight in exhibitions at the Academy of Arts, Berlin.

In 1877 she married her fellow painter Adalbert Begas, who was fifteen years her senior and an equally fervent admirer of Italy. The couple moved into a luxurious house with a studio south of the Tiergarten in Berlin, where she created fans with Romantic motifs of flowers or Italian vines, as well as the usual canvas paintings, according to the current fashions. They also took repeated "study-trips" to Italy, especially Sicily, Capri and Venice. On one of these trips in 1888, Adalbert died of a lung ailment.

She continued to travel and exhibit widely, however. Begas-Parmentier exhibited her work at the Woman's Building at the 1893 World's Columbian Exposition in Chicago, Illinois. For several years, she served on the board of the Verein der Berliner Künstlerinnen, an artists' association for promoting art by women, who were not able to attend the official academies until 1919.

In addition to her artistic activities, her home was famous as a literary salon. In 1900, the magazine Daheim stated, "She is one of the most popular and most honored phenomena of the Berlin artistic world; the center of a fine intellectual, casual, artistic sociability". Among the prominent people who were regular guests, one may mention Isadora Duncan, Tilla Durieux, Samuel Fischer, Alfred Kerr, Ernst von Wildenbruch and Harry Graf Kessler.

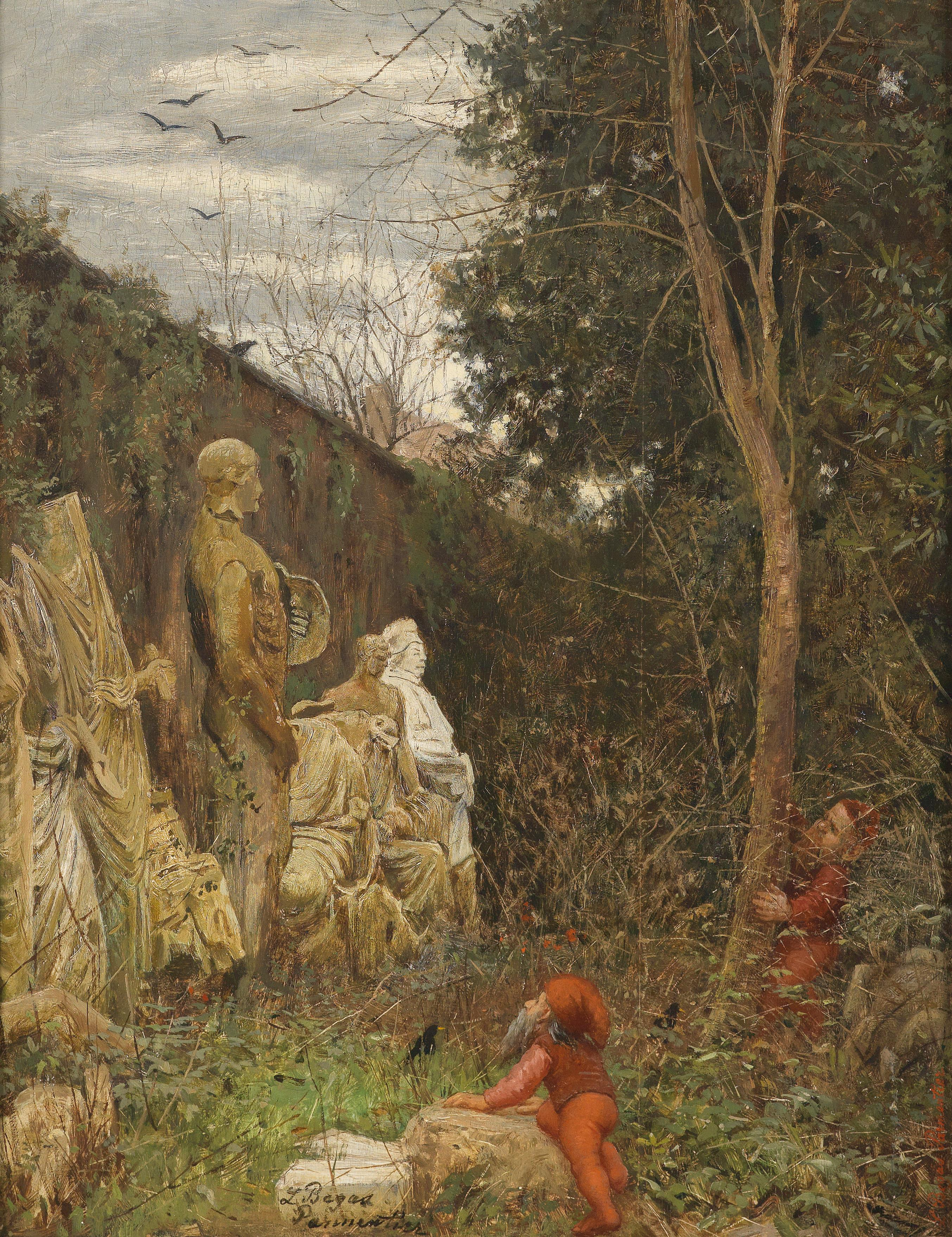
Gnomes by the Castle Wall

Begas-Parmentier died on 11 February 1920 in Berlin, Germany.

== Sources ==
- "Begas-Parmentier, Luise". Benezit Dictionary of Artists. 2011.
