= Freeman's-Hindman =

American auction house

Freeman's | Hindman
- Founded: 1805; 221 years ago
- Headquarters: Chicago, Illinois, United States
- Area served: Worldwide
- Revenue: US$32 million (2023)
- Website: hindmanauctions.com

Freeman's | Hindman (formerly Freeman's and Samuel T. Freeman & Co.) is an American auction house founded in 1805 by Tristram B. Freeman, a British print seller, in Philadelphia, Pennsylvania. It is recognized as the oldest auction house in the United States.

The company remained under the ownership of the Freeman family until 2016, when it was sold to a private partnership. In January 2024, Freeman's merged with Chicago-based Leslie Hindman Auctioneers and began operating under the name Freeman's | Hindman.

== History ==
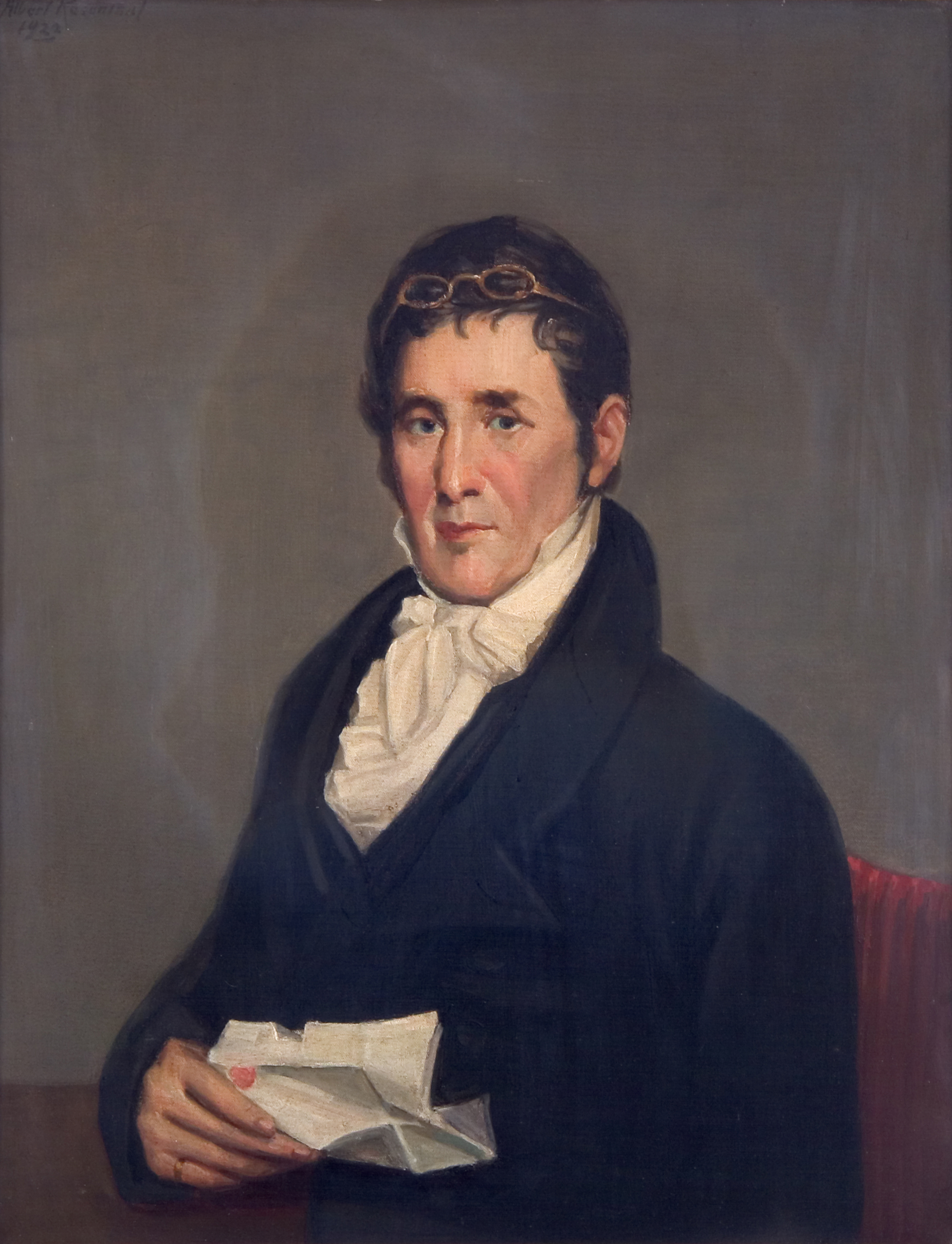
Tristram Bampfylde Freeman, founder of Freeman's auction house in Philadelphia.

Freeman's auction business began when Tristram Bampfylde Freeman auctioned off bales of textiles at the Merchant’s Coffee House in Philadelphia. Freeman, who emigrated from London in 1795, had previously worked as a printer but was unsuccessful in that trade. He instead turned to auctioneering, selling merchandise that arrived through the Philadelphia port as well as local real estate. In 1805, Pennsylvania Governor Thomas McKean appointed him to the official post of auctioneer in Philadelphia, and Freeman formally established his business. For 17 years, he held a monopoly on public auctioneering in the city until the business was opened to competition.

In the 19th century, Freeman's handled real estate and industrial auctions. The company sold not only the contents of schooners but, on occasion, the vessels themselves. After operating at the Merchant’s Coffee House at Second and Chestnut Streets, the business relocated twice more before constructing its purpose-built headquarters at 1810 Chestnut Street in 1923. An early milestone came in the 1880s when Freeman's auctioned the Philadelphia Post Office building for $425,000, then a record price for a piece of real estate sold at auction.

Throughout much of the 20th century, Freeman's business model emphasized high volume. By the 1990s, the house was selling approximately 50,000 lots annually, averaging $110 per lot and generating about $5.5 million in sales. A turning point came when a single fine art auction of only 160 lots achieved the same revenue, prompting the house to shift its focus toward the high-end art market. In 2016, Freeman's was sold to a partnership associated with Lyon & Turnbull. Samuel M. "Beau" Freeman II, the sixth generation of the Freeman family to lead the firm, continued as chairman until his death in June 2017.

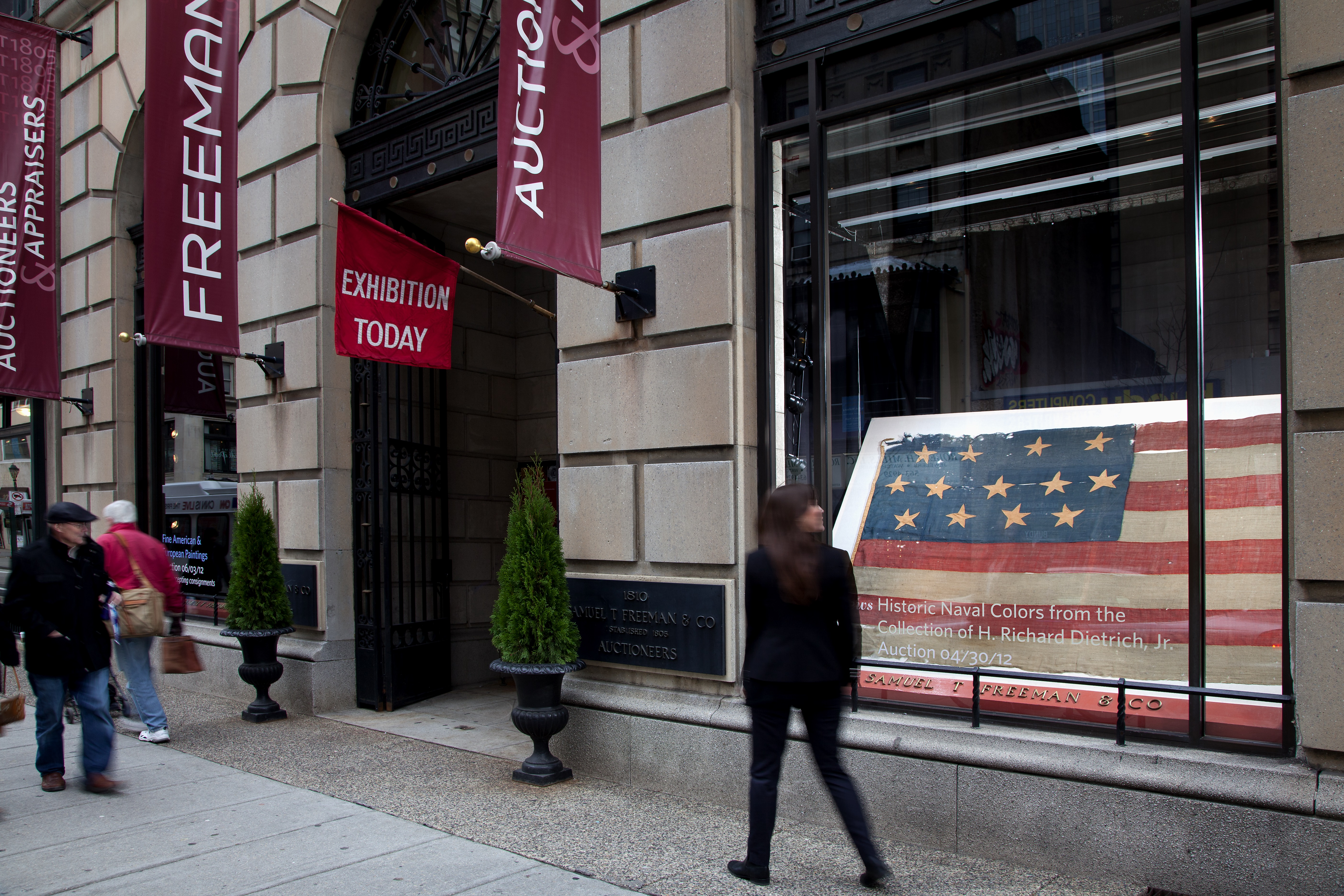
Entrance to Freeman's former Chestnut Street showroom.

In 2019, Freeman's relocated its Philadelphia showroom to 2400 Market Street. Its former Chestnut Street building was subsequently sold to a developer.

Today, Freeman's conducts more than 25 in-house auctions annually across a wide range of categories, including American Furniture, Folk and Decorative Arts, English and Continental Furniture and Decorative Arts, Asian Arts, American Art and Pennsylvania Impressionists, European Art and Old Masters, Modern and Contemporary Art, Books, Maps and Manuscripts, 20th-Century Design, Jewelry and Watches, Silver, and objets de vertu.

== Notable auction records ==
On September 10, 2011, Freeman's achieved a record sale of $3.5 million for an Imperial white jade seal from the Qianlong period, more than triple the company's previous highest auction result.

Other notable results include a record for Wharton Esherick set during Freeman's annual Pennsylvania Sale in November 2014, when a sculpture by the artist contributed to nearly $2 million in sales. In November 2017, a draped canvas painting by Sam Gilliam sold for $370,000, setting an auction record for the artist.

That same month, Freeman's also set a company jewelry record when a rare Belle Époque fancy vivid yellow diamond pendant by J.E. Caldwell & Co. sold for $760,000, making it the most expensive piece of jewelry ever sold by the house.

In February 2021, Freeman's achieved its highest sale to date in its European Art and Old Masters Auction, when Carl Moll's rediscovered masterpiece Weißes Interieur (White Interior) sold for $4,756,000. The result surpassed the house's previous record of $3.5 million set in 2011 for the jade seal.

== Collections ==
Freeman's has been entrusted with the sale of several major collections of fine art and antiques, including the Richard M. Scrushy Collection, the Lehman Brothers Collection, property from the Reed & Barton Archives, the Avon Collection of Photography, and the Collection of Historic USS Constitution Colors of H. Richard Dietrich, Jr.

In March 2014, Freeman's presented the George D. Horst Collection of Fine Art, which achieved 20 auction records for artists including Howard Russell Butler, Emil Carlsen, and Fred Wagner.

In April 2016, the house sold the private Washington, D.C., collection of Jeffrey M. Kaplan. The 465-lot auction realized more than $1.2 million. Later that year, in December, Freeman's sold the Brewster Collection of paintings, furniture, and decorative items from Nancy and Andre Brewster.

In May 2017, Freeman's auctioned paintings and prints from the Stanley Bard Collection, assembled by the late manager of the famed Chelsea Hotel. The sale included Tom Wesselmann’s Face #1, which sold for $958,000.
