= Emil Jakob Schindler =

Austrian landscape painter (1842–1892)

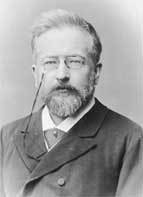
- Born: 27 April 1842; Vienna
- Died: 9 August 1892 (aged 50); Westerland

Emil Jakob Schindler (27 April 1842 – 9 August 1892) was an Austrian landscape painter. His eldest daughter was the author and composer Alma Mahler.

== Life ==
He was born to a family of cotton spinning-mill operators that had been established in Fischamend, a village south of Vienna, since the 17th century. His father, Julius Jakob Schindler (1814–1846), died of lung cancer when Emil was only four years old. His mother, Maria Anna (née Penz, 1816–1886) soon afterwards took him to Pressburg (Bratislava). Three years later, on 10 February 1849, she married Second Lieutenant (later Captain), Mathias Eduard Nepalleck (1815–1873), who served in the local 2nd Hungarian Infantry Regiment. This may have been a forced marriage because, one month after the wedding, she gave birth to a daughter, Alexandrine Nepalleck (3 March 1849 – 4 September 1932).

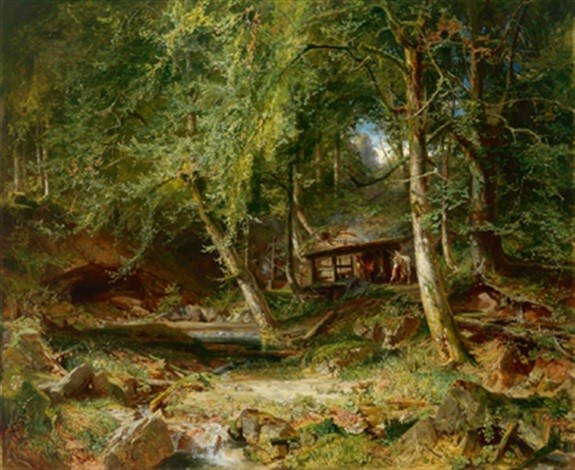
Eine Waldschmiede

Little is known about Schindler's early life. He probably began school in 1848, took piano lessons, and prepared for a military career. He did, in fact, join the army in 1857, and may have taken part in the Battle of Solferino. Not long after, however, he left the army and, in 1860, entered the Academy of Fine Arts, Vienna, where he studied with Albert Zimmermann. He found his inspiration, however, in the Dutch Masters such as Meindert Hobbema and Jacob Izaaksoon van Ruisdael. In 1873, he travelled to Venice and Dalmatia; a trip sponsored by the industrialist Friedrich Franz von Leitenberger (1837–1899). Later, he visited France and Holland.

In the spring of 1864, barely twenty-two years old, he exhibited publicly in Vienna for the first time, and sold his first painting, "Eine Waldschmiede" (A Forest Blacksmith) for 350 florins. After moving about, in 1867 he was able to find a permanent home in Landstraße, where he was registered as an "Historienmaler" (History painter). Two years later, he relocated to Wieden, where many artists lived, including one of Schindler's favorites, Hans Makart. When his step-father died, he took a larger apartment where his mother and half-sister soon joined him.

=== Musical pastimes and marriage ===
Schindler often took part in the evening feasts held at the Vienna Künstlerhaus. This prompted him to take singing lessons with Gustav Geiringer (1856–1945), a pianist and voice teacher. Later, he studied with Adele Passy-Cornet, a former opera soprano who had opened her own singing school in Mariahilf. This gave him the confidence to perform publicly and was briefly a member of a popular quartet led by Karl Udel.

During this time, he took on Tina Blau as a student and, from 1875 to 1876, they shared a studio. A burgeoning personal relationship apparently led to a quarrel and she left. The following year, however, he was preparing an amateur performance of Lenardo and Blandine, an opera by Franz Mögele (1834–1907) when his half-sister Alexandrine, who had the leading role, was suddenly taken ill and Schindler asked Passy-Cornet to find a stand-in. She presented him to one of her new pupils, a twenty-year old German girl, Anna Sofie Bergen (1857–1938). Anna was accepted and, while working with Schindler, they fell in love. In 1878, their engagement was announced in the Viennese daily Fremden-Blatt.

Her professional career proved to be very short-lived. After six performances in the title role of Die Wallfahrt der Königin (The Queen's Pilgrimage) a comic opera by Josef Forster, she suddenly retired, either because Schindler strongly opposed her public appearances out of jealousy or because she was pregnant.

They were married in 1879 and, a month later, appeared together for the first and last time in another work by Mögele, the operetta Ritter Toggenburg. In August of that year, Anna gave birth to Alma Magaretha Maria, who would later become famous as Alma Mahler. A second daughter, Margaretha Julie (Grete), was born a year later. She was married to painter Wilhelm Legler, by whom she had a child. She led a less fortunate life and, in 1942, died at a mental hospital in Großschweidnitz, murdered by the Nazis.

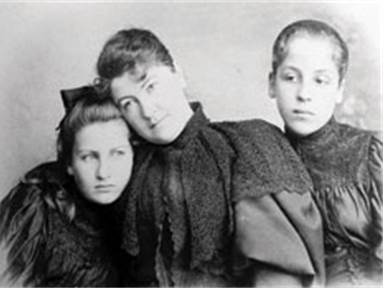
Anna Schindler with Alma (left) and Grete (c. 1890)

=== Infidelity allegations ===
Shortly after Alma's birth, Anna was suspected of having an affair with the painter, Julius Victor Berger. Two years after Grete's birth, she was accused of carrying on another affair with Carl Moll, one of her husband's students. Schindler kept a diary in those years which is preserved in part by the Austrian National Library. Extracts were also published in a book by Moll (Emil Jakob Schindler, Vienna 1930). In an entry of 15 October 1879, 1½ months after Alma's birth, Schindler complained that his joy at the birth was tempered by "separation" from his wife. This was apparently resolved but, in an unpublished manuscript by Alma, Der schimmernde Weg (The Shimmering Road) she claims that Berger was Grete's real father. However, the facts in the case are confusing, and no conclusion has been reached.

Many explanations have been proposed as to why she never had any more children with Schindler because, after his death, she married Moll and gave birth to another daughter (Maria) at the age of 42.

=== Later life and successes ===
In 1881, he was awarded the Reichel-Preis which came with a cash award of 1,500 florins, enabling the family to rent a large new apartment that was previously occupied by Passy-Cornet, who had moved to Budapest. Winning the prize also served to attract more clients and their financial condition continued to improve. From 1885 onwards, he rented the Castle Plankenberg, near Neulengbach, where he spent his summers and established an artists' colony. He had several students there, including Marie Egner, his former studio mate Tina Blau, Olga Wisinger-Florian and Luise Begas-Parmentier. Two years later (1887), he received a commission from Rudolf, Crown Prince of Austria to sketch the coastal scenery in Dalmatia and on the island of Corfu, as part of a grand project called The Austro-Hungarian Monarchy in Word and Picture. That same year, he became an honorary member of the Vienna Academy. In 1888, the Munich Academy followed suit.

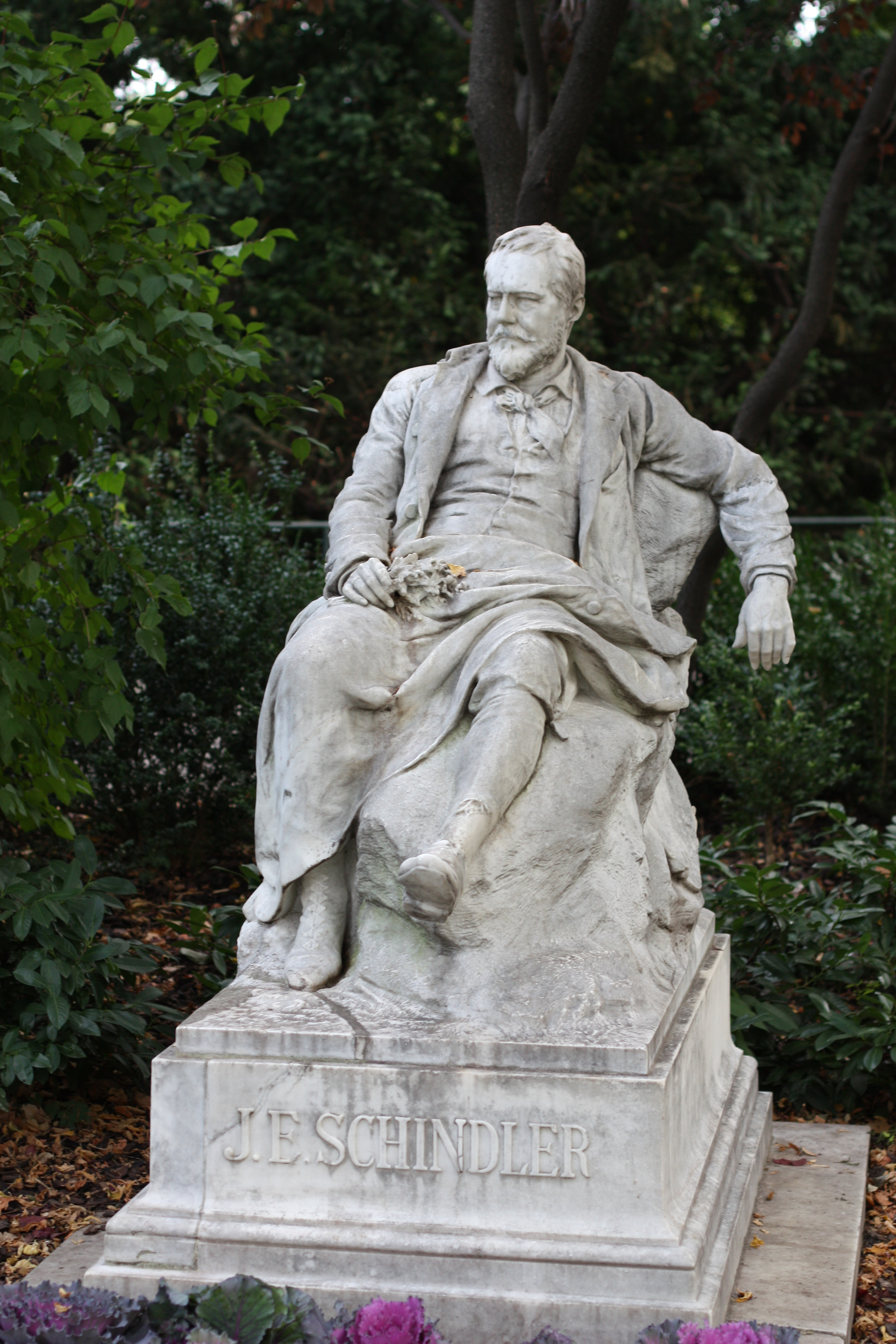
Schindler monument by Hellmer

Schindler adored his two daughters, and at an early age, arranged for piano lessons with Adele Radnitzky-Mandlick, who taught them for several years. They had their debut in 1890, aged ten and nine. He also made certain they received a full education, which was not common practice at the time, and sent them to a private women's academy after becoming displeased with the public schools.

He also tried his hand at writing, producing a five act verse drama entitled Anna (1890, not about his wife), which was never published, and art criticism under the pen name "Justus". His feelings about the Viennese schools prompted him to write an essay: "On School Education".

=== Death and cultural impact ===
His death is generally attributed to appendicitis, which he had left untreated for too long while on vacation. However, his death certificate, as published in the Wiener Zeitung (17 August 1892, p. 10), gives the cause as paralytic ileus.

According to contemporary newspaper reports, Schindler died at 2 p.m. on August 9, 1892, only five days after his arrival to Sylt, in great pain but fully conscious. At his deathbed he was surrounded by his wife, his two daughters, Carl Moll and a vicar. The reports thus also clearly contradicts Alma Mahler's much-cited recollections on her father's death. According to his own wishes Schindler was buried next to his mother on 14 August in the churchyard of Ober St. Veit (Hietzing).

An auction of his paintings at the beginning of December 1892, arranged by Carl Moll and the art dealer, Hugo Othmar Miethke (1834–1911), produced a net profit of ca. 80,000 florins (Gulden).

On October 1, 1895, Schindler's remains were exhumed and transferred to the Zentralfriedhof, where the City of Vienna had dedicated an honorary grave ("Ehrengrab") to him, with a new tombstone with his bust made by his friend, Edmund Hellmer, who also made the statue for the Stadtpark, unveiled on October 14, 1895. The original tombstone by Hellmer was probably destroyed by bombs in 1945 and later replaced by a plain headstone that only bears Schindler's names, but not his life dates.

In 1894, a street in the Währing District had been named after him. In 1912, Moll, who was now director of the Galerie Miethke in Vienna, held their first solo exhibition of Schindler's paintings, to commemorate the 20th anniversary of his death.

== Selected paintings ==
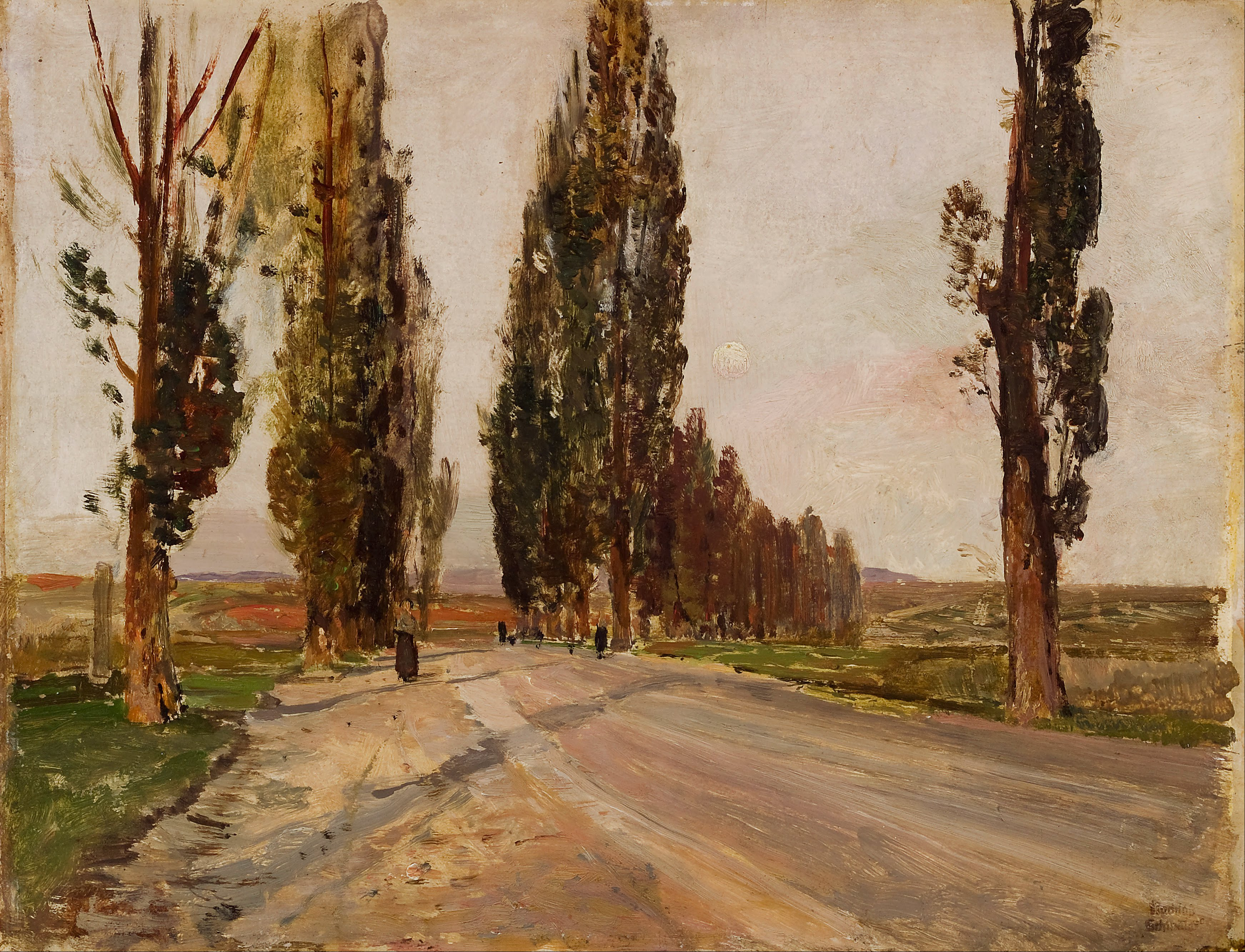
Boulevard of Poplars
near Plankenberg (c.1890)

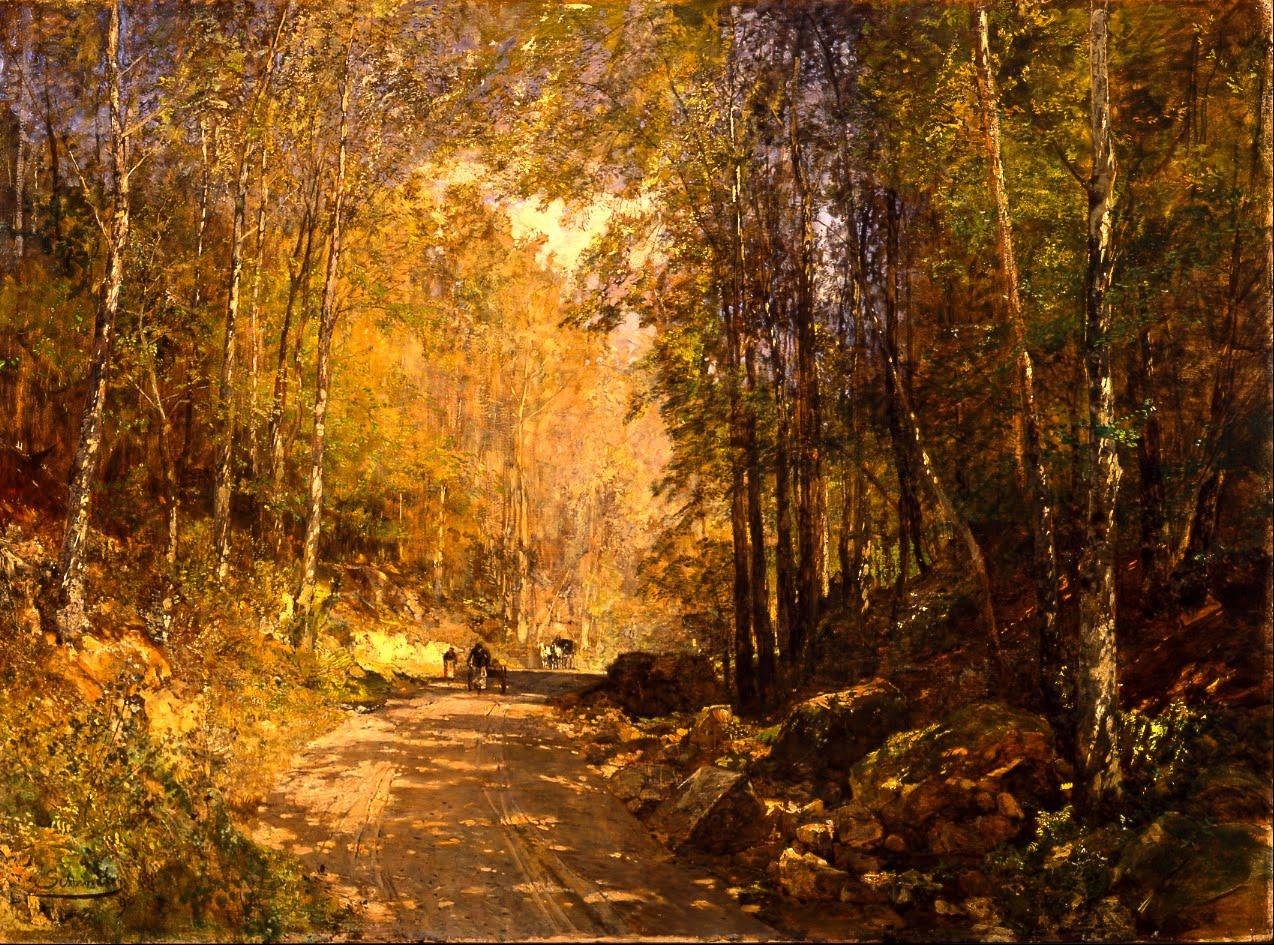
Forest Lane near Schärfling
(Sankt Lorenz, 1890)

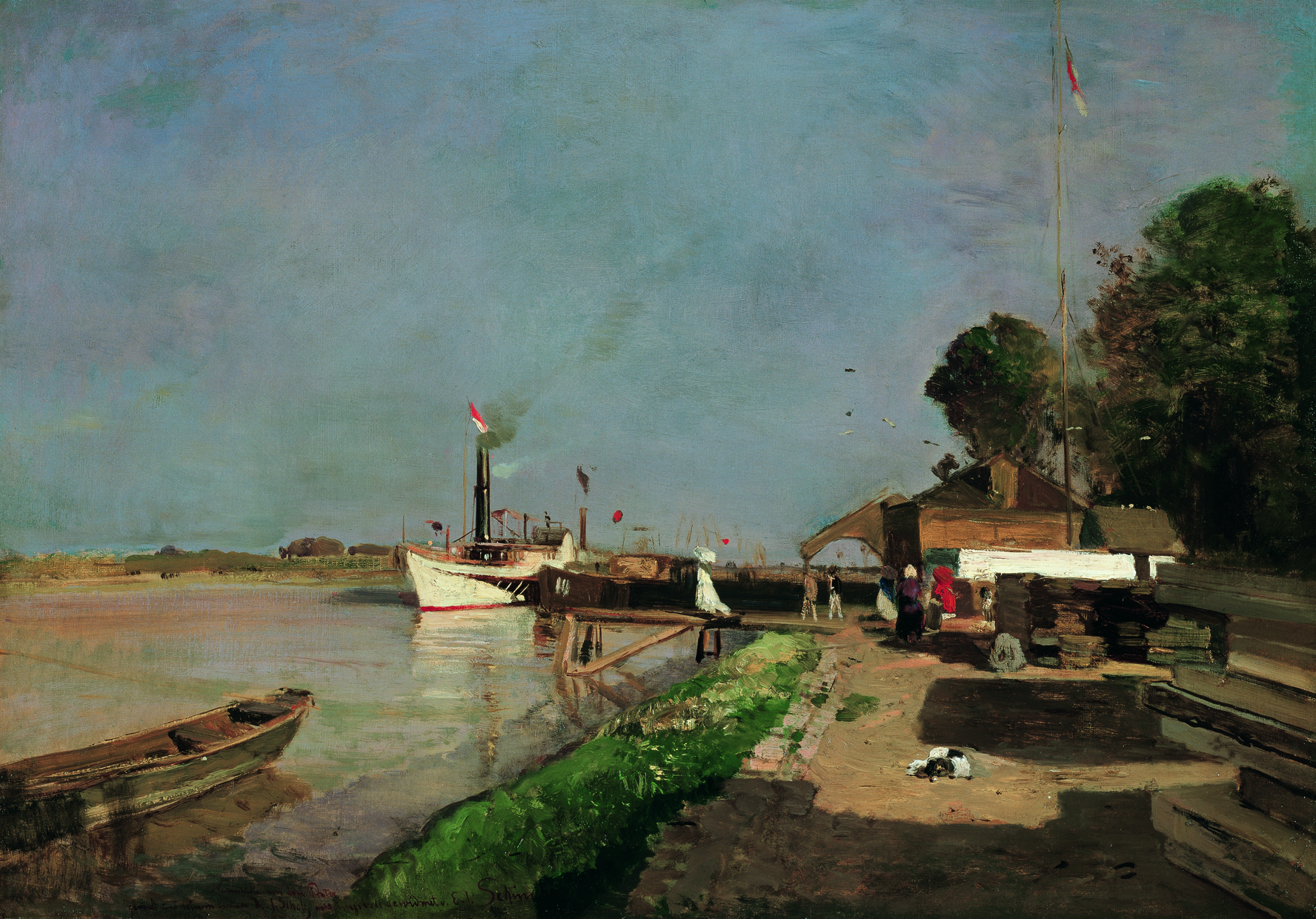
The Steamer Station opposite
Kaisermühlen, Vienna (c.1872)

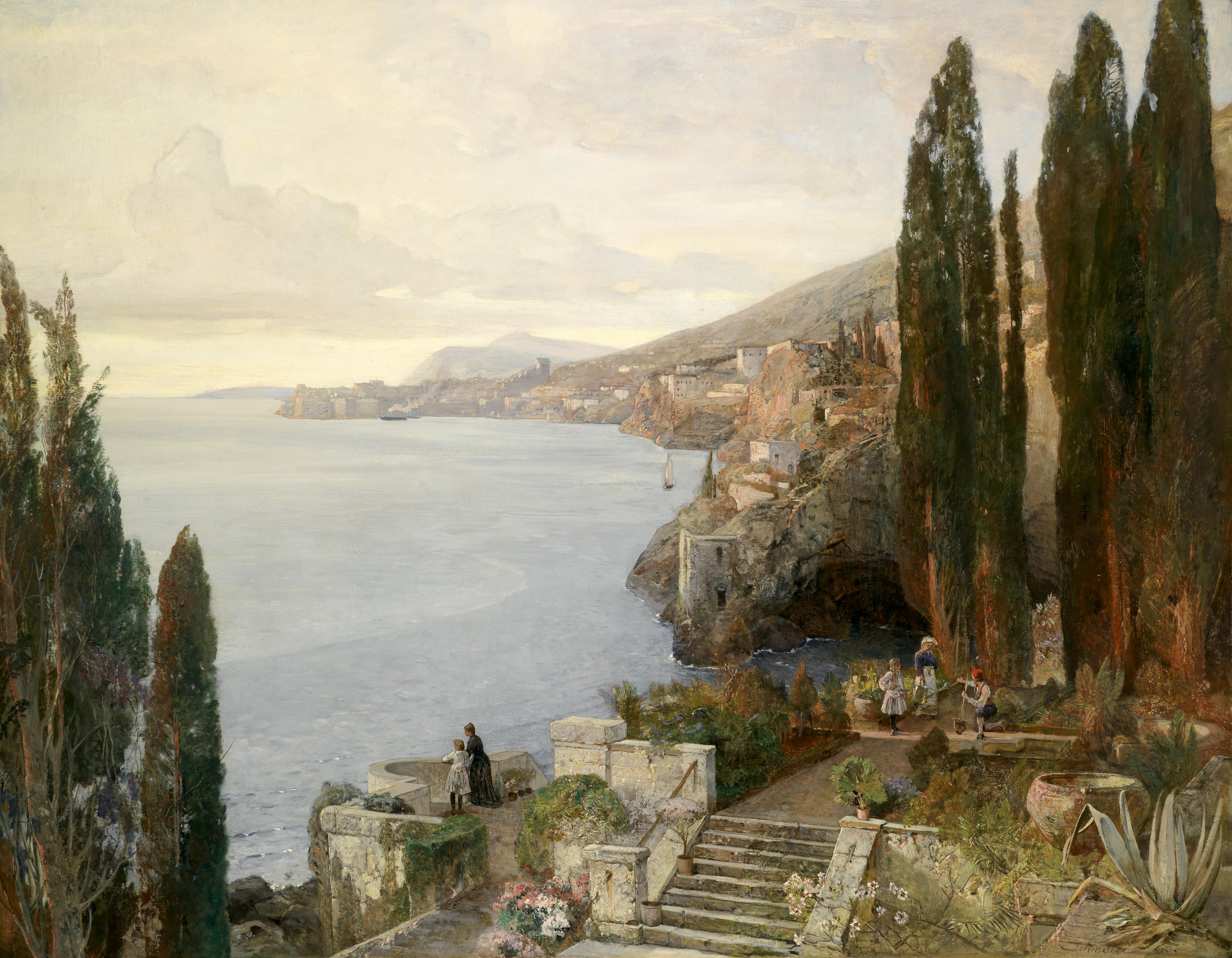
View of Ragusa (1890)
