= Lyon & Turnbull =

Auction house based in Scotland

- Exterior of Edinburgh building.
- Formation: 1826; 200 years ago
- Headquarters: 33 Broughton Place; Edinburgh, Scotland; United Kingdom
- Board of directors: Gavin Strang, Managing Director; Iain Mackinnon, Chairman; Nick Curnow, Vice Chairman; Paul Roberts, Vice Chairman; Campbell Armour, Non-Executive Director; John Mackie, Director; Philip Smith, Director; Alex Dove, Marketing Director; Willie Bremner, Finance Director
- Website: lyonandturnbull.com

Founded in 1826, Lyon & Turnbull is a UK-based auction house and the oldest in Scotland. The company originated in Edinburgh and has since expanded its operations to London and Glasgow. Lyon & Turnbull conducts specialist auctions in fine art, design, jewellery and rare objects, combining its 19th-century heritage with contemporary auction practices.

== History ==
=== 19th Century ===
The company traces its origins to Jonathan Lyon, who began trading as an auctioneer in Edinburgh in 1826, placing his first advertisement on 18 October that year. His son William Lyon later joined the business, and in 1863 formed a partnership with William Elliot Turnbull, establishing the firm’s name.

In the late nineteenth century, Lyon & Turnbull became known for conducting a wide range of sales that attracted buyers from across the UK, particularly London.

=== 20th Century ===
During the early twentieth century, the firm grew into one of Scotland’s leading auction houses. It continued to operate through both World Wars, with weekly sales advertised in The Scotsman. The open-air Lane Sales, held in Edinburgh’s Thistle Street Lane at the back of their established salerooms, became a regular feature of Edinburgh’s commercial life, attracting crowds of local buyers and international visitors.

In the post-war decades, the firm continued to operate from its long-established premises on George Street, opposite the Assembly Rooms complex. Auctioneers Ord Kennedy Reid and William Plews were mentioned in contemporary reports for continuing the informal style traditionally associated with Edinburgh’s salerooms.

By the late twentieth century, the auction market had become increasingly competitive, driven by the expansion of major London houses and evolving commercial practices. During this period, Lyon & Turnbull maintained its focus on client trust and expertise while beginning to modernise its operations and adapt to a changing market.

In 1999, Lyon & Turnbull was acquired by a group of auctioneers who had left Phillips, an auction house which was the third largest in the world during the 1990s. They were joined in the enterprise by Sir Angus Grossart, Chairman of Noble Grossart, a Scottish merchant bank, and a past chairman of the trustees of the National Galleries of Scotland. The company's stated aim was "to rescue a national institution for Scotland and to establish a high quality auction house with an international footprint from a base in Edinburgh".

=== 21st Century ===
Since 1999, Lyon & Turnbull has expanded its reach across the United Kingdom and internationally. Its headquarters were relocated to a converted 19th-century church at Broughton Place, Edinburgh, which now contains the main saleroom and several specialist departments.

Recognising the importance of the London art market, Lyon & Turnbull established a permanent base in Mayfair, at 22 Connaught Street, to serve its growing network of clients in the south of England and internationally. The London location hosts regular valuation events, previews, and specialist auctions.

In addition to its Mayfair premises, the company also stages high-profile sales and exhibitions across other London venues, including the Mall Galleries, Porchester Place and the Royal Opera Arcade, providing wider access to collectors and consignors. Among these, MODERN MADE, the firm’s major biannual art and design auction, is held at the Mall Galleries and has become a cornerstone of its London calendar.

=== Today ===
As of the 2020s, Lyon & Turnbull conducts more than fifty specialist auctions annually across collecting areas including fine art, design, Scottish art, jewellery, sculptures, silver, Asian works of art, rare books, and furniture. The firm also stages themed and single-owner auctions accompanied by public exhibitions throughout the UK.

Lyon & Turnbull maintains a strategic partnership with Freeman's, the oldest auction house in the United States, enabling collaboration across fine art, design, and jewellery departments and cross-Atlantic sales in Edinburgh, London, Philadelphia, New York and Chicago.

Several specialists have participated in programmes such as the BBC’s Antiques Roadshow and in curatorial and academic collaborations alongside contributing to research projects and public engagement in the wider art and design sector.

Notable sales have included L. S. Lowry’s Glasgow Docks 1947 painting and the sale of the Drambuie Art Collection, which profited over £4 million (US$7,836,606).

== Locations ==
Lyon & Turnbull's Edinburgh headquarters is based in Broughton Place in Edinburgh, in a neoclassical building designed by Archibald Elliot, which was built in 1821. Their London gallery is located in Connaught Street and their Glasgow gallery on Bath Street.

== Notable Auctions ==
In May 2021, Lyon & Turnbull auctioned a 14th-century French Gothic ivory casket, discovered in an Aberdeenshire family home. The casket achieved a sale price of £1,455,000 (including premium), setting a world auction record for its type and marking the highest price ever attained at auction in Scotland.

In 2022, a bottle of "The Intrepid", the world's largest bottle of whisky, sold for about £1.4 million.
