= Carl Moll =

Austrian painter

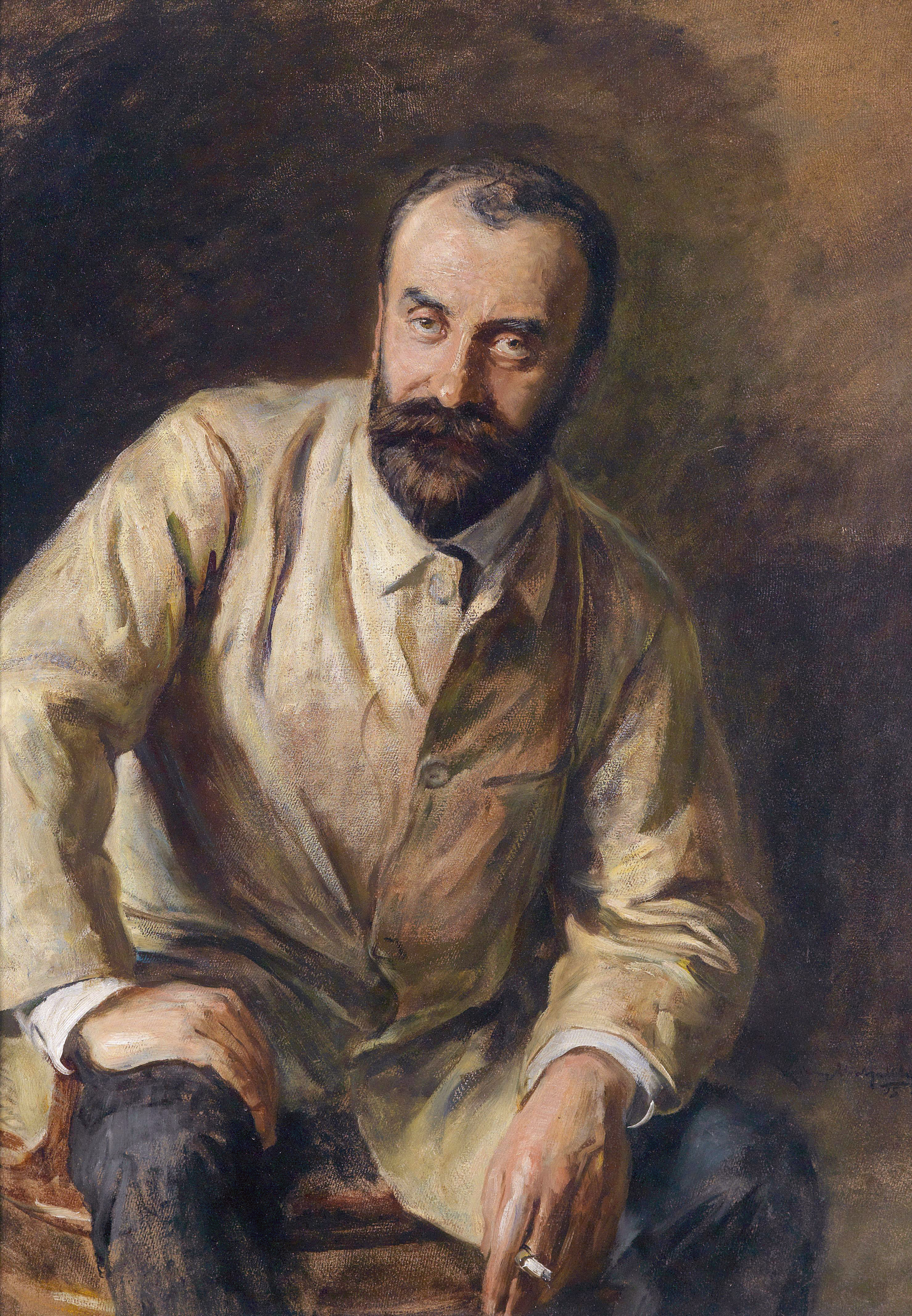
- Carl Moll (1905), attributed to Ludwig Michalek
- Born: Carl Julius Rudolf Moll; 23 April 1861; Vienna, Austrian Empire
- Died: 12 April 1945 (aged 83); Vienna, Austria
- Known for: Painting
- Movement: Art Nouveau

Carl Julius Rudolf Moll (23 April 1861 – 12 April 1945) was an Austrian Art Nouveau painter active in Vienna at the start of the 20th century. He was one of the artists of the Vienna Secession who took inspiration from the pointillist techniques of French Impressionists. He was an early supporter of the Nazis and committed suicide as Soviet forces approached Vienna at the end of World War II.

== Life and career ==
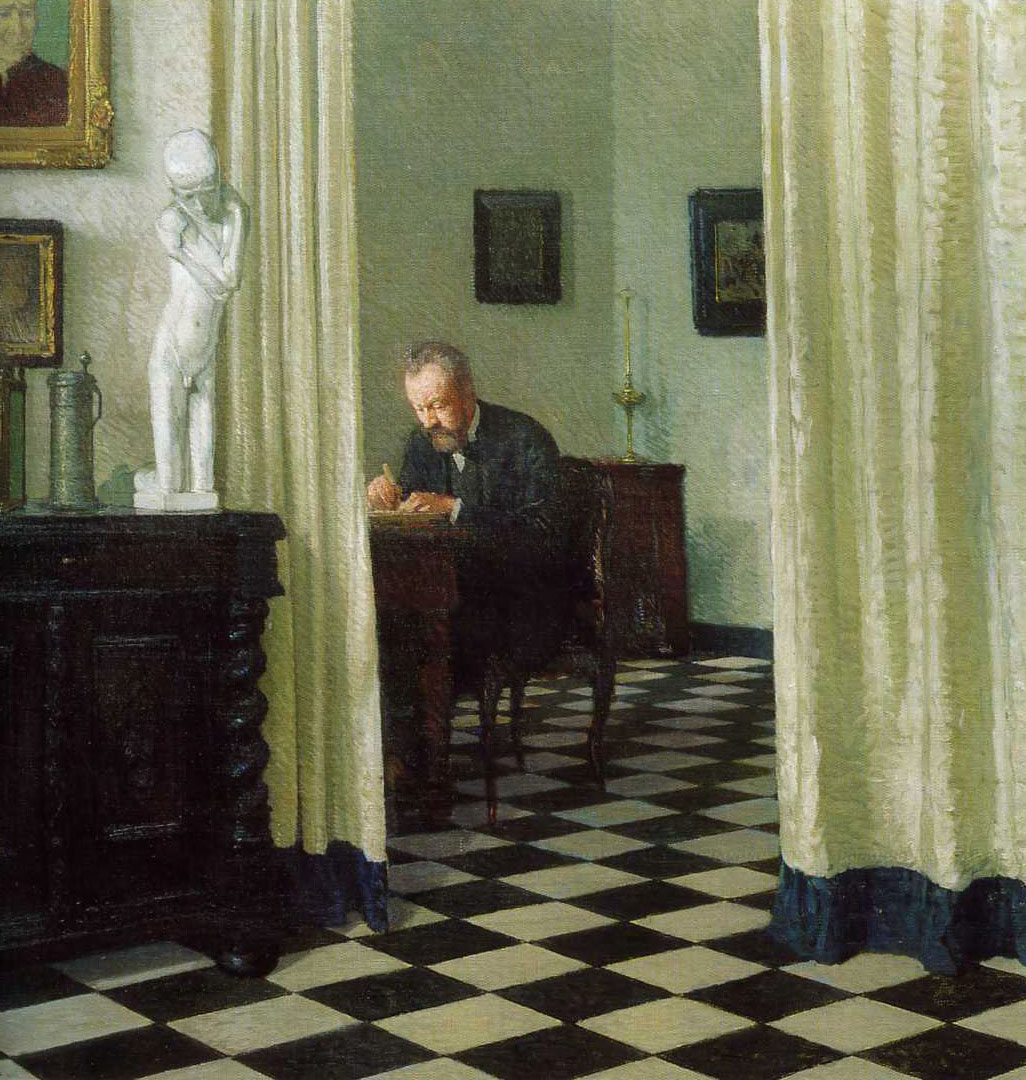
Self Portrait in his Study, 1906, (oil on canvas, 100 cm × 100 cm), Gemäldegalerie der Akademie der bildenden Künste Wien, Vienna

Moll was born in Vienna, Austria. He studied art at the Academy of Fine Arts Vienna. He was a student of Christian Griepenkerl and of Emil Jakob Schindler (the father of Alma Mahler-Werfel née Schindler). After his teacher's 1892 death, Moll married Schindler's widow, Anna (née von Bergen); they had been lovers for some time.

Moll was a founder-member of the Vienna Secession in 1897 and, in 1903 encouraged the use of the Belvedere Gallery to show exhibitions of modern Austrian art. In 1905 he, along with Gustav Klimt, left the Secession, although Moll continued to be involved with the exhibition of art in Vienna including the first exhibition in Vienna of the work of Vincent van Gogh (the second painting above the sideboard in his 1906 self-portrait is Van Gogh's Portrait of the Artist's Mother). His paintings are characterized by the use of pointillist techniques within a strict organization of the surface of the painting.

He committed suicide by poison at the end of World War II, in Vienna, along with his daughter Maria and son-in-law Richard Eberstaller, a Viennese lawyer. All three had been early Nazi Party supporters.

== Auction records ==
On 21 June 2013, the online auction house Auctionata in Berlin sold Moll's Villa in Vienna for 240,000 Euros. Previously a smaller painting, a still-life entitled Speisezimmer I, from the Rau collection fetched 286,700 Euros at Lempertz, a world-record price for the artist.

The Viennese auction house Dorotheum sold his painting "Blick auf Nussdorf und Heiligenstadt in der Dämmerung" for 228,839 Euros on 27 November 2007.

In 2018, the National Gallery of Canada acquired the 1901 work At the Lunch Table, previously thought to have been lost in the 1930s. It had been owned by Siegmund Isaias Zollschan of Vienna, who was murdered in the Holocaust; he had sent it to a relative in Canada for safekeeping before the war, where it remained in family hands until acquired by the gallery.

In 2021, Freeman's Auctioneers & Appraisers in Philadelphia, USA sold Moll's "Weißes Interieur (White Interior)" for $4,756,000. This rediscovered masterpiece was Freeman's highest selling lot to date, surpassing the house's 2011 record of $3.1m achieved by an important Imperial white jade seal from the Qianlong period.

== Bibliography ==
- O. Matulla: "Moll Karl". In: Österreichisches Biographisches Lexikon 1815–1950 (ÖBL). Vol. 6, Austrian Academy of Sciences, Vienna 1975, ISBN 3-7001-0128-7, p. 353.
- Edwin Lachnit. "Moll, Carl." In Grove Art Online. Oxford Art Online, (accessed January 9, 2012; subscription required).
- Tobias G. Natter, Gerbert Frodl (eds.): "Carl Moll. 1861–1945. Maler und Organisator", Vienna 1998, ISBN 3-85349-228-2.
