= Julius Victor Berger =

Austrian artist (1850–1902)

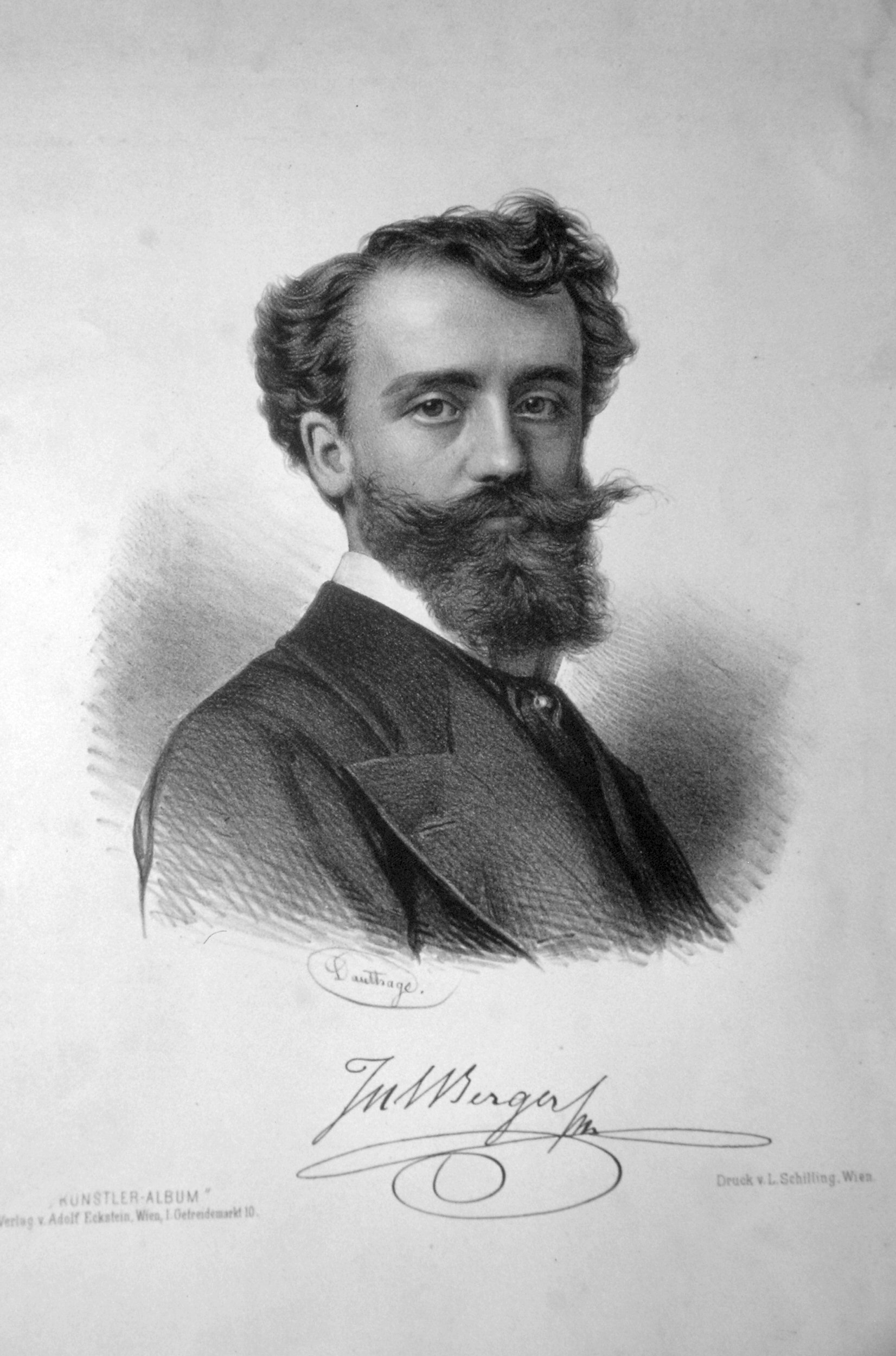
Julius Victor Berger, Lithograph by Adolf Dauthage, c. 1880

Julius Victor Berger (20 July 1850, Neutitschein, Moravia — 17 November 1902, Vienna) was an Austrian painter who is known primarily for his genre paintings and portraits.

== Life ==
Julius Berger's was the son of Ignaz Johann Berger, who was also a painter. He entered the Academy of Fine Arts in Vienna at the young age of 14. In 1874 he was granted a three-year scholarship to study art in Rome.

Upon returning to Vienna he briefly shared an apartment with fellow painter Emil Jakob Schindler and his wife Anna Sofie. While Schindler was traveling Berger began an affair with Anna. He was almost certainly the father of Margarethe Julie Schindler (b. 16 August 1880), who was the half sister of Alma Maria Schindler.

Berger became a professor of decorative painting at the Wiener Kunstgewerbeschule in 1881, and in 1887 a professor at the Academy of Fine Arts. Among his friends was the history painter Hans Makart.

Berger's most recognized work is the ceiling painting in Hall XIX of the Kunsthistorisches Museum in Vienna. He is interred in the Zentralfriedhof, also in Vienna (Group 14A, Number 8).

== Selected paintings ==
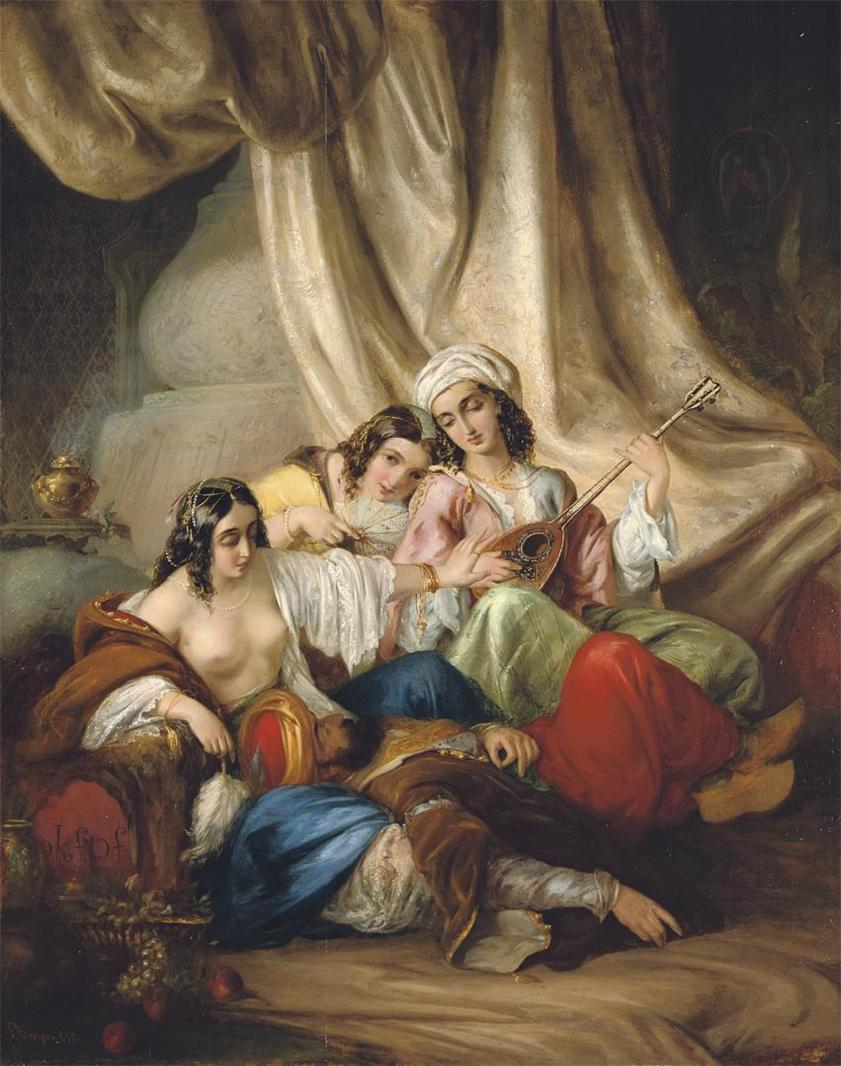
The Magic of Music

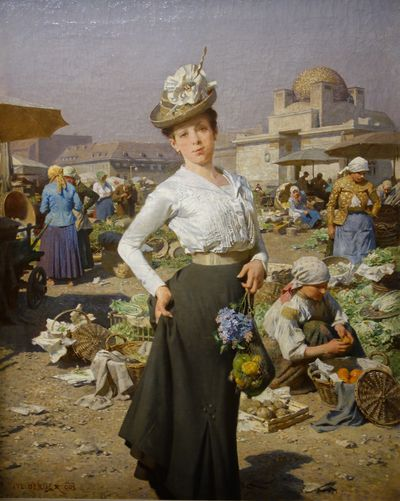
Young Woman
at the Market

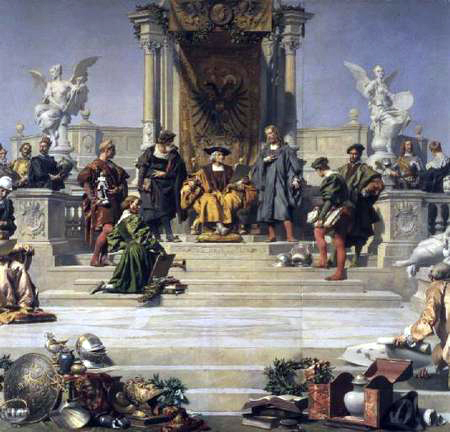
Patronage of the Arts by the
House of Habsburg

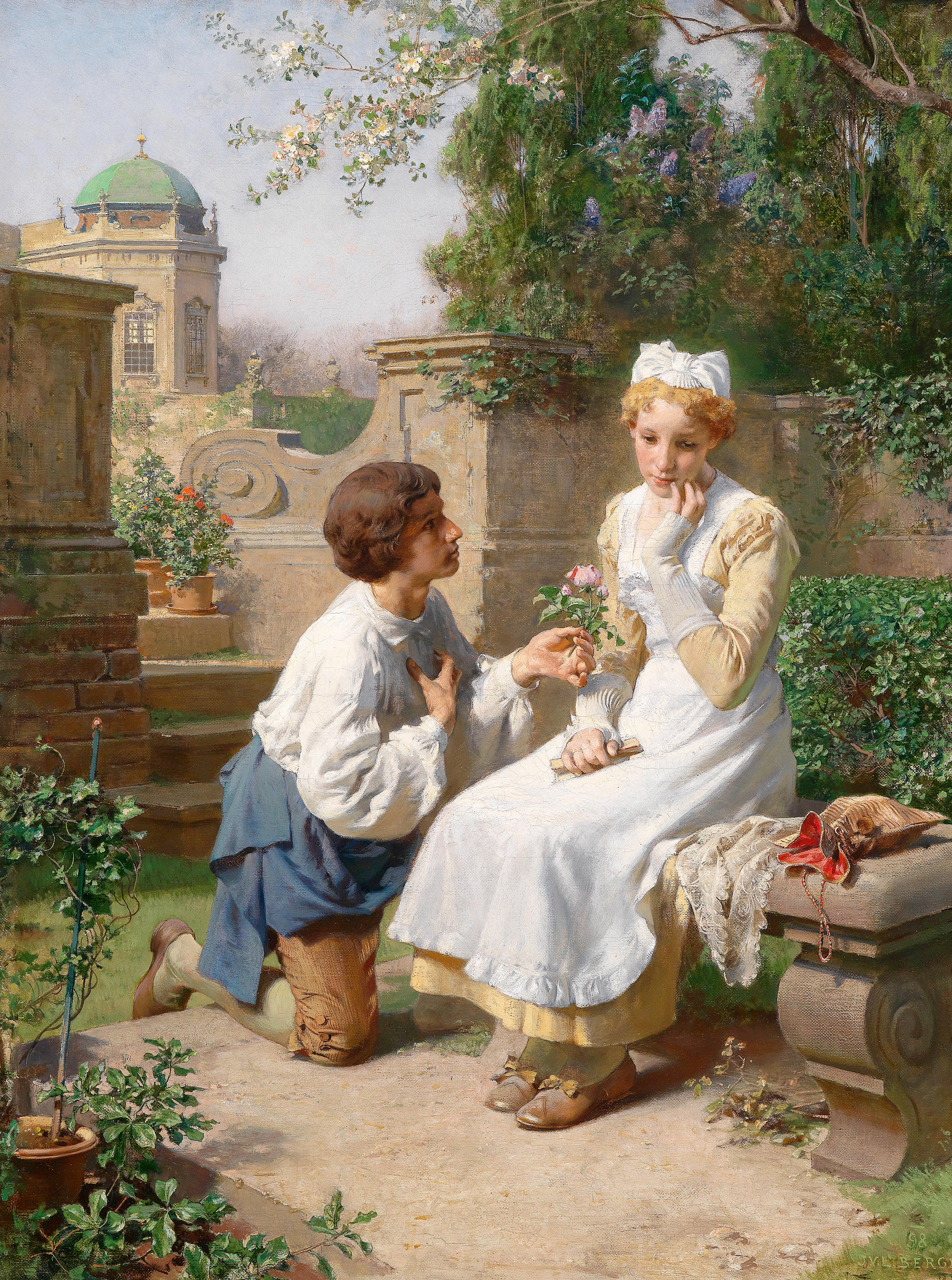
Romantic Scene in the Belvedere Garden
