= Julius Berger (rabbi) =

Canadian Conservative rabbi (1893–1953)

Personal life
- Born: 1893 Ottawa, Ontario
- Died: 1 March 1953 (aged 58) Montreal, Quebec
- Buried: Back River Memorial Gardens Cemetery, Montreal
- Education: University of Ottawa

Religious life
- Religion: Judaism
- Denomination: Conservative
- Synagogue: Shaare Zion Congregation
- Position: Rabbi
- Began: 1925
- Ended: 1947
- Semikhah: Jewish Theological Seminary of America

Julius Berger (1893 – March 1, 1953) was a Canadian Conservative rabbi. He was the first rabbinic leader of the Shaare Zion Congregation in Montreal.

== Biography ==
Julius Berger was born in 1893 in Ottawa. His father was Lithuanian-born rabbi Joseph Berger, and his brother was lawyer Sam Berger.

Berger was a graduate of the Jewish Theological Seminary of America, and became rabbi of Shaare Zion Congregation in Montreal in 1925. During the Second World War he served as chaplain with the Royal Canadian Air Force.

Berger's academic work focused on Jewish elementary education. He was a founding member of the Canadian Society of Biblical Studies in 1933. He received a PhD from the University of Ottawa in 1950.

== Selected publications ==
- Elementary Education in the Talmud: The Fountain Head of Many Modern Pedagogical Ideas. Montreal: Eagle Publishing Co. 1929.
- The Weekly Sermon: Sermons on the Portion of the Week and for the Holydays and Festivals. New York: Bloch Publishing Co. 1931.
- Berger, Julius (1950). Fundamental Jewish Educational Ideals (Ph.D. thesis). Ottawa: University of Ottawa. doi:10.20381/ruor-8930.
