= Anton Hanak =

Austrian sculptor (1875–1934)

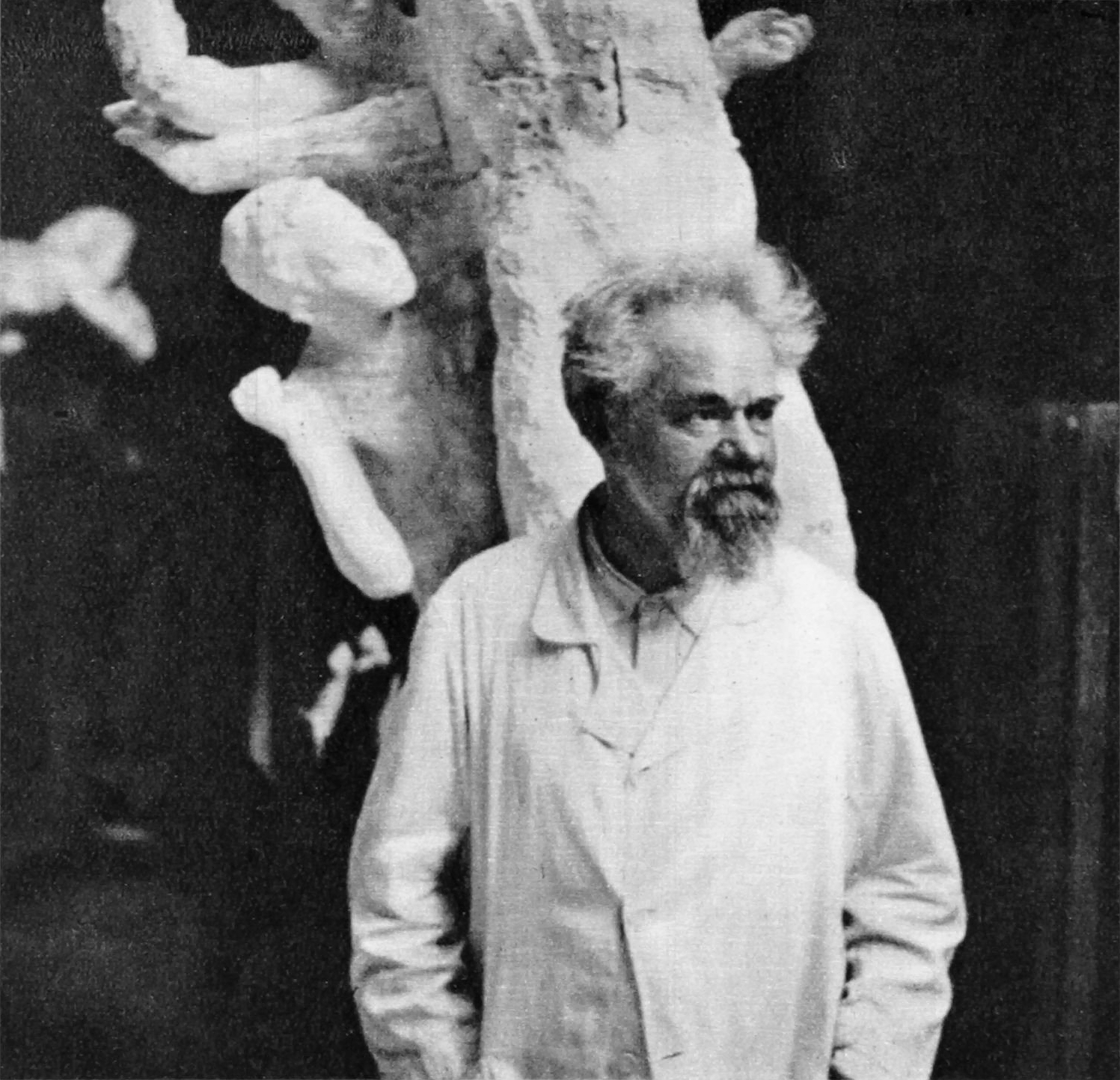
Anton Hanak (c.1933), photograph by Otto Skall

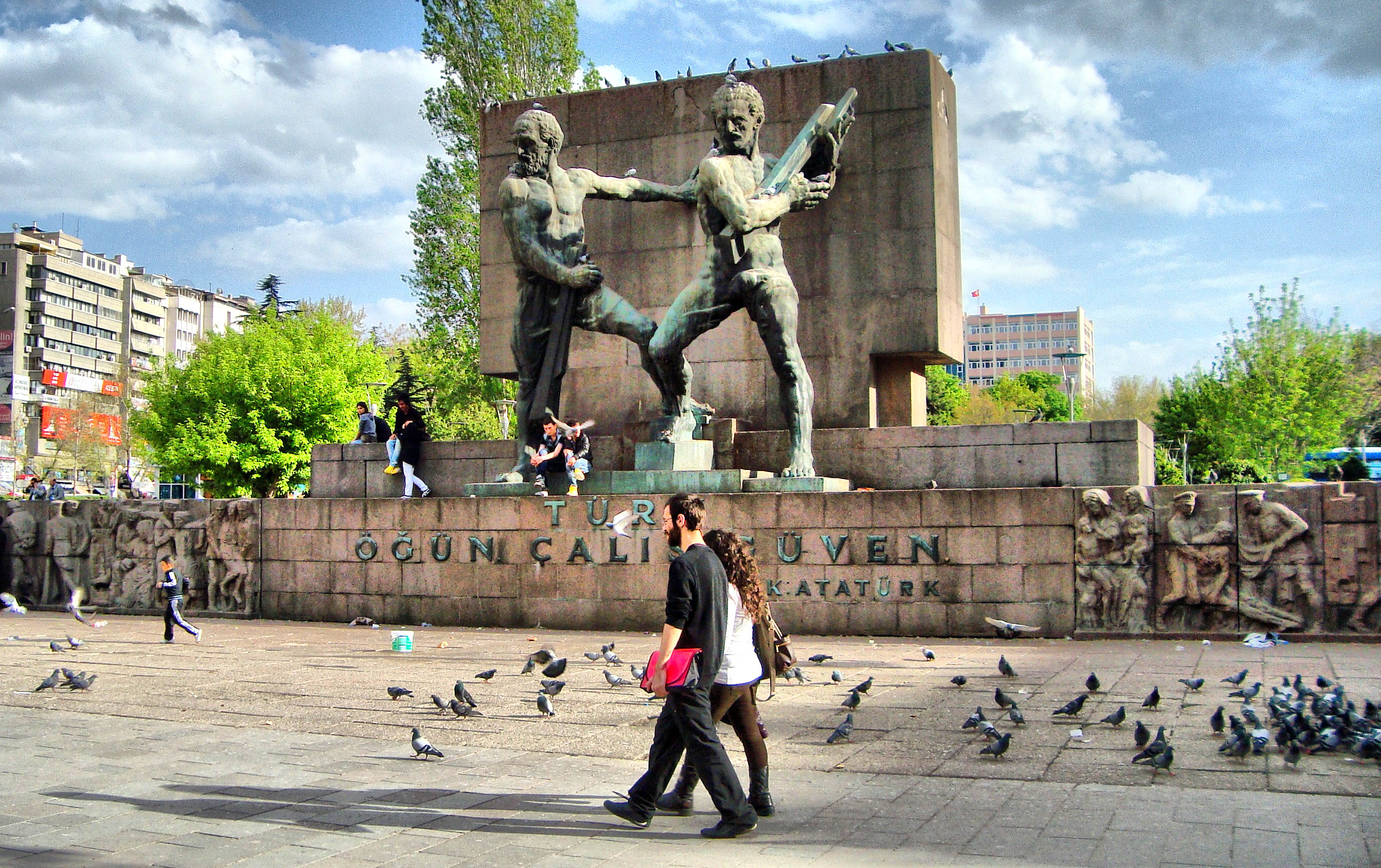
The Trust Monument in Ankara (2011)

Anton Hanak (22 March 1875, Brünn – 7 January 1934, Vienna) was an Austrian sculptor and art Professor. His works tend to have a visionary-symbolic character, related to Expressionism.

== Biography ==
He studied with Edmund von Hellmer at the Academy of Fine Arts, Vienna, and was associated with the Vienna Secession. He was also a member of the Vienna Werkstätte, as well as having been a founding member of the Österreichischer Werkbund. In 1913, he became a teacher at the Kunstgewerbeschule and, after 1932, a professor at the academy. His students included Karl Duldig, Fritz Wotruba, Oskar Icha, Ena Rottenberg, Margarete Hanusch, Adolf Treberer-Treberspurg, Gustav Resatz, Franz Hagenauer and Pepi Weixlgärtner-Neutra.

He created decorative sculptures for several buildings designed by the architect, Josef Hoffmann, including the Villa Primavesi. During the 1920s, he performed similar work for housing developments by the City of Vienna. He also created portrait busts and monuments; notably the "Mater Dolorosa" war memorial at the Wiener Zentralfriedhof, and a bust of Victor Adler for the Republikdenkmal.

The final project he worked on involved large sculptures for the "Güven Anıtı" (translated as security or trust - literally, "Confidence Monument") in Ankara, which was proposed and initiated in 1931 by Clemens Holzmeister. It was left unfinished at the time of Hanak's death and was completed by Josef Thorak in 1936. The monument has since been damaged twice; by graffiti during the Gezi Park protests (2013), and by shrapnel during the attempted coup in 2016.

He died of a heart attack and was interred at the Hietzinger Friedhof. A street in Vienna's Penzing district is named after him.

At the Langenzersdorf Museum, there is a special area devoted to the work of him and his students.

== Sources ==
- "Hanak Anton". In: Österreichisches Biographisches Lexikon 1815–1950 (ÖBL). Vol. 2, Austrian Academy of Sciences, Vienna 1959, p. 172 f. (Direct links to "p. 172", "p. 173")
- Hugo Haberfeld: "Der Bildhauer Anton Hanak", In: Neues Wiener Journal, Vol. 27, # 9179, 1919, pgs.5–6 (online).
- Friedrich Grassegger, Wolfgang Krug: Anton Hanak (1875–1934). Böhlau, 1997 ISBN 978-3-205-98599-0
