= Hans Bitterlich =

Austrian sculptor (1860–1949)

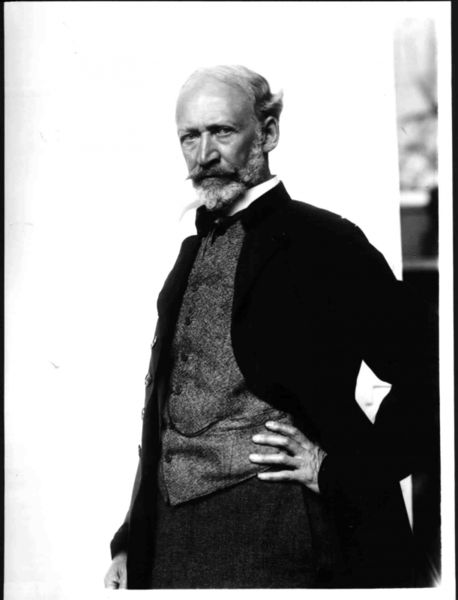
Hans Bitterlich (c. 1920)

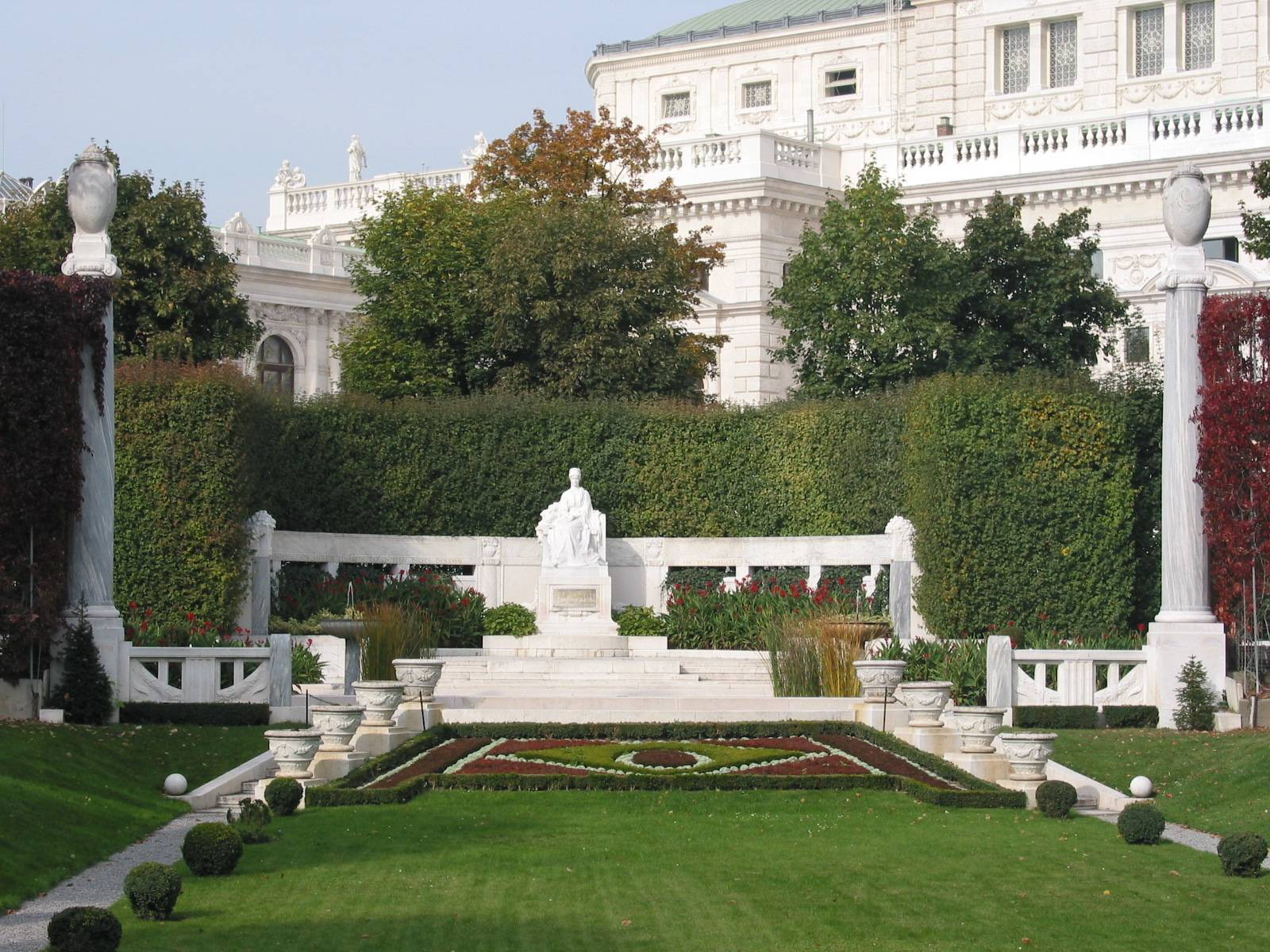
The Empress Elisabeth Monument

Hans Bitterlich (28 April 1860, Vienna - 5 August 1949, Vienna) was an Austrian sculptor.

== Life and work ==
His father was the sculptor and history painter, Eduard Bitterlich. He studied with Edmund von Hellmer and Kaspar von Zumbusch, and was a professor at the Academy of Fine Arts, Vienna, from 1901 to 1931.

His best known works include a monument to Gutenberg in the Lugeck district (1900), and the monument to Empress Elisabeth in the Volksgarten, both with an architectural framework by Friedrich Ohmann.

In 1943, he was awarded the Goethe-Medaille für Kunst und Wissenschaft, and placed on the Gottbegnadeten list of Joseph Goebbels, as an important artist of the Nazi state.

He was interred in the Wiener Zentralfriedhof in a Gewidmete Gräber der Stadt Wien (Dedicated Grave).
