= Elisabeth Söderberg =

Austrian-born Swedish painter, textile artist and art teacher

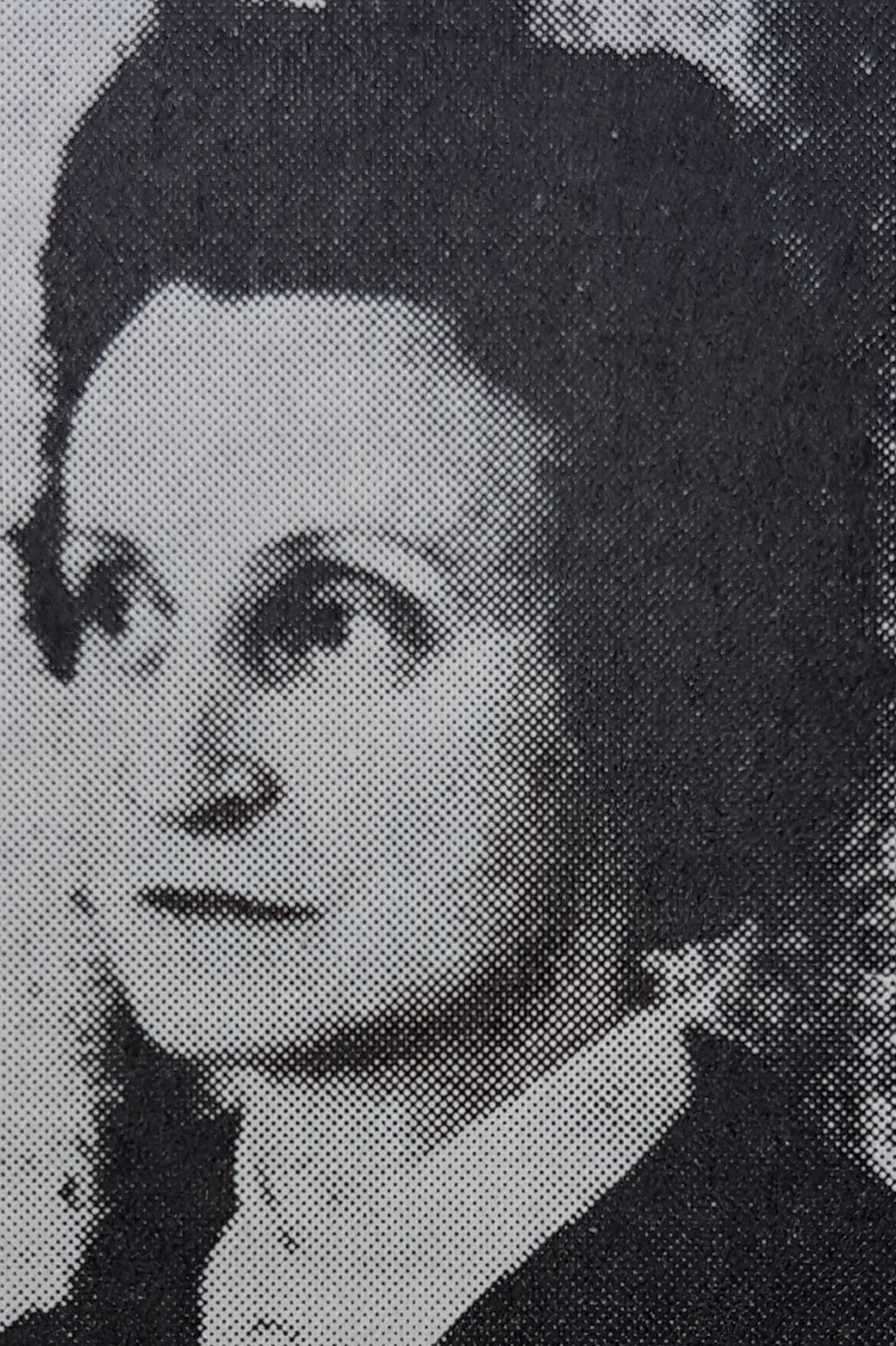
Elisabeth Söderberg

Elisabeth Pauline Therese Söderberg née Weixlgärtner (21 January 1912, Vienna — 9 March 1991, Gothenburg) was an Austrian-born Swedish painter, textile artist and art teacher who graduated from the Academy of Fine Arts Vienna. As a result of her Jewish heritage, after the Anschluß she was dismissed from the Austrian Artists Association and in early 1942 moved to Stockholm with her Swedish husband. In parallel with her employment as an art teacher in Swedish schools and at the University of Gothenburg, she painted landscapes and produced paintings, textiles and other decorations for many Swedish churches. Her works are represented in the County Museum of Gävleborg as well as in museums in Rome and Vienna.

== Early life ==
Born on 21 January 1912 in Vienna, Elisabeth Pauline Therese Weixlgärtner was the daughter of the art historian Arpad Weixlgärtner (1872–1961) and his wife the artist Josephine Therese (Pepi) Weixlgärtner née Neutra (1886–1981). She was the older of the family's two children. From 1927, when only 15, she attended the Academy of Fine Arts Vienna, studying under Karl Sterrer, Wilhelm Dachauer and Ferdinand Andri. She graduated as a painter and art teacher in 1932. In 1942, she married the Swedish violinist Karl Söderberg (1893–1949) and moved with him to Sweden. She completed her studies in Stockholm.

== Career ==
After her husband's death, Söderberg taught first in Swedish schools and then at the University of Gothenburg. In parallel, she painted and became increasingly involved in church art, creating altar paintings, stained-glass windows and large copper-enamel decorations.

She exhibited in the Vatican Pavilion at the 1964 New York World's Fair and from 1961 she exhibited with her mother in applied art museums in Vienna, Zurich, Frankfurt and Nuremberg. Her works are in the collections of the Galleria Nazionale d'Arte Moderna in Rome, the Vienna Museum and the Israel Museum.

Elisabeth Söderberg died in Gothenburg on 9 March 1991.
