= Ena Rottenberg =

Hungarian-Austrian craftswoman, draftswoman, ceramist

- Born: Emma Helena Rottenberg; 9 November 1893; Oravița, Austria-Hungary
- Died: 4 June 1952 (aged 58); Vienna, Austria
- Education: Vienna School of Applied Arts

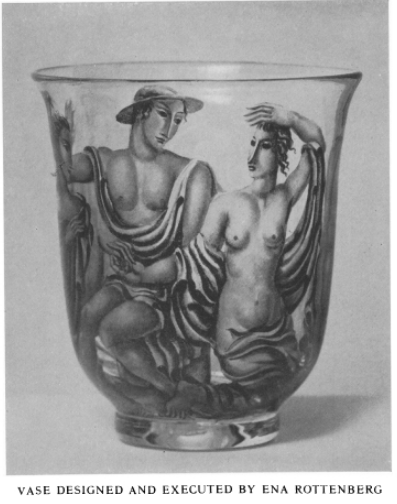
Vase by Ena Rottenberg, ca. 1929

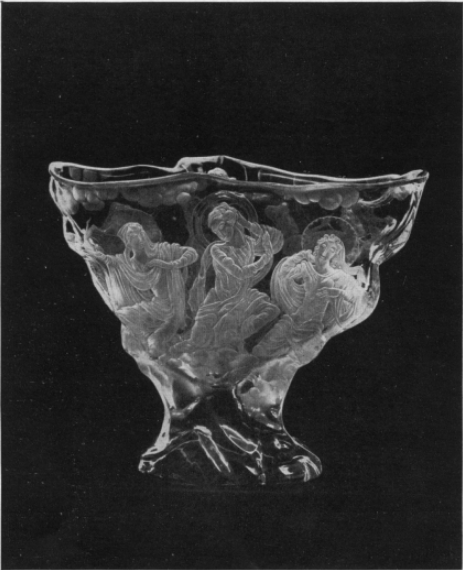
Vase by Ena Rottenberg, ca. 1930

Ena Rottenberg (born Emma Helena Rottenberg; 9 November 1893 – 4 June 1952) was a Hungarian-Austrian craftswoman, draftswoman, ceramist and member of the artists' community of the Wiener Werkstätte.

== Career ==
Ena Rottenberg began studying at the Vienna School of Applied Arts (K.K. Kunstgewerbeschule) in 1916. Her teachers included the sculptors Josef Breitner and Anton Hanak and the painter Anton von Kenner. After graduating, she worked as a freelance painter and made designs for ceramics, decorations for cut glass, jewellery and ivory paintings, selling her pieces through the Wiener Werkstätte. In the mid-1920s, she designed four stained-glass windows for a Viennese convent of Franciscan nuns.

In the 1920s, Ena Rottenberg worked not only with the Wiener Werkstätte but also with the Vienna Porcelain Manufactory Augarten, Friedrich Goldscheider, the Gobelin Manufactory and the J. & L. Lobmeyr Glass Manufactory.

Together with Carl Drobnik & Sons, she developed bright, transparent enamel colors for Lobmeyr. On several occasions when designing the glass vessels with semi-transparent enamel for Lobmeyr, she worked together with the draftswoman Lotte Fink. In addition to enamel decorations, she also created engraved and relief-carved large glass vessels. In 1925 she was invited to present vases with black enamel decoration and the showpiece "Die Welle Woge" (The Billowing Wave), which was to form the focal point of the glass section of the 1925 exhibition, at the Exposition Internationale des arts décoratifs et industriels Modernes in Paris. Rottenberg received a gold medal for her designs.

From 1923 to 1925, Ena Rottenberg was a student of Michael Powolny, who had a lasting influence on her work. In the mid-1920s she began working for the Augarten Porcelain Manufactory. Alongside Hertha Bucher Mathilde Jaksch, Ida Schwetz-Lehmann and Dina Kuhn, Ena Rottenberg established herself as one of the most influential designers at the manufactory. She designed eight figures and around 125 decorations for vases, bowls and mugs for Augarten.

She presented her most successful porcelain design in 1930: the simple Art Deco tea and coffee service No. 20 Ena, which is still produced today in various decors and variants. The exotic-looking design of the Orient service with various lid knobs in the form of "exotic heads", figures from countries where tea and coffee is grown, was particularly successful. In 1931 she took part with her designs in the exhibition of the Austrian Women Artists Association.

In 1937, the Czechoslovak pavilion won a Grand Prize at the 1937 Paris World's Fair. Henry Schlevogt of the Curt Schlevogt glassworks had introduced a new glass technique with a look similar to marble, malachite and lapiz lazuli, the "Ingrid" line. Schlevogt had commissioned pieces from sculptors including Ena Rottenberg and Josef Bernhard, which are credited as part of the reason that the pavilion won the award.

In the 1930s she drew designs for various tapestries for the Viennese Gobelins manufactory. After the Second World War she worked again for Augarten and made decorative designs for coffee sets, vases and lidded boxes. Ena Rottenberg died in Vienna on 4 June 1952.

Her designs and objects are now shown in glass, porcelain and design museums at home and abroad, including the Indianapolis Museum of Art, the Corning Museum of Glass, the RISD Museum, the Porzellanmuseum of the Vienna Porcelain Manufactory Augarten, the Passau Glass Museum, the Museum of Applied Arts, Vienna, and the Metropolitan Museum of Art.
