= Friedrich Ohmann =

Austrian architect and university educator (1858–1927)

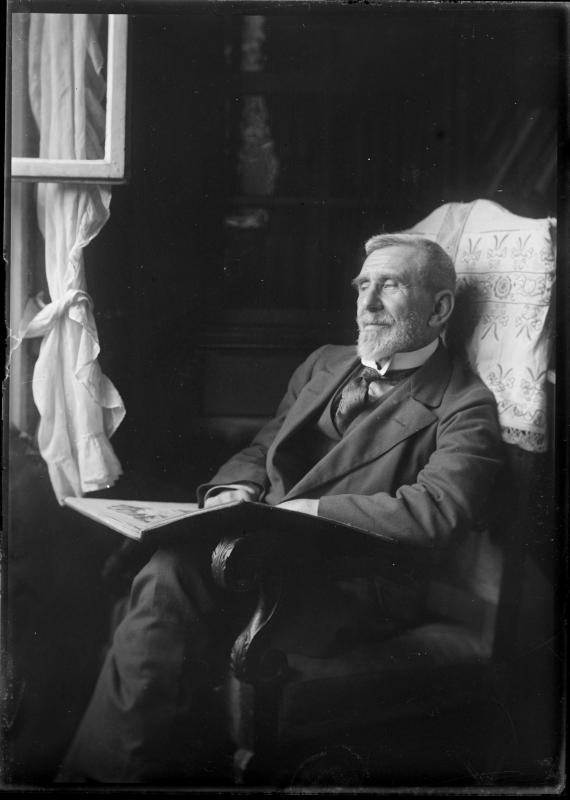
Friedrich Ohmann (1920)

Friedrich Ohmann (21 December 1858, Lemberg - 6 April 1927, Vienna) was an Austrian architect in the Historicist style.

== Life and work ==
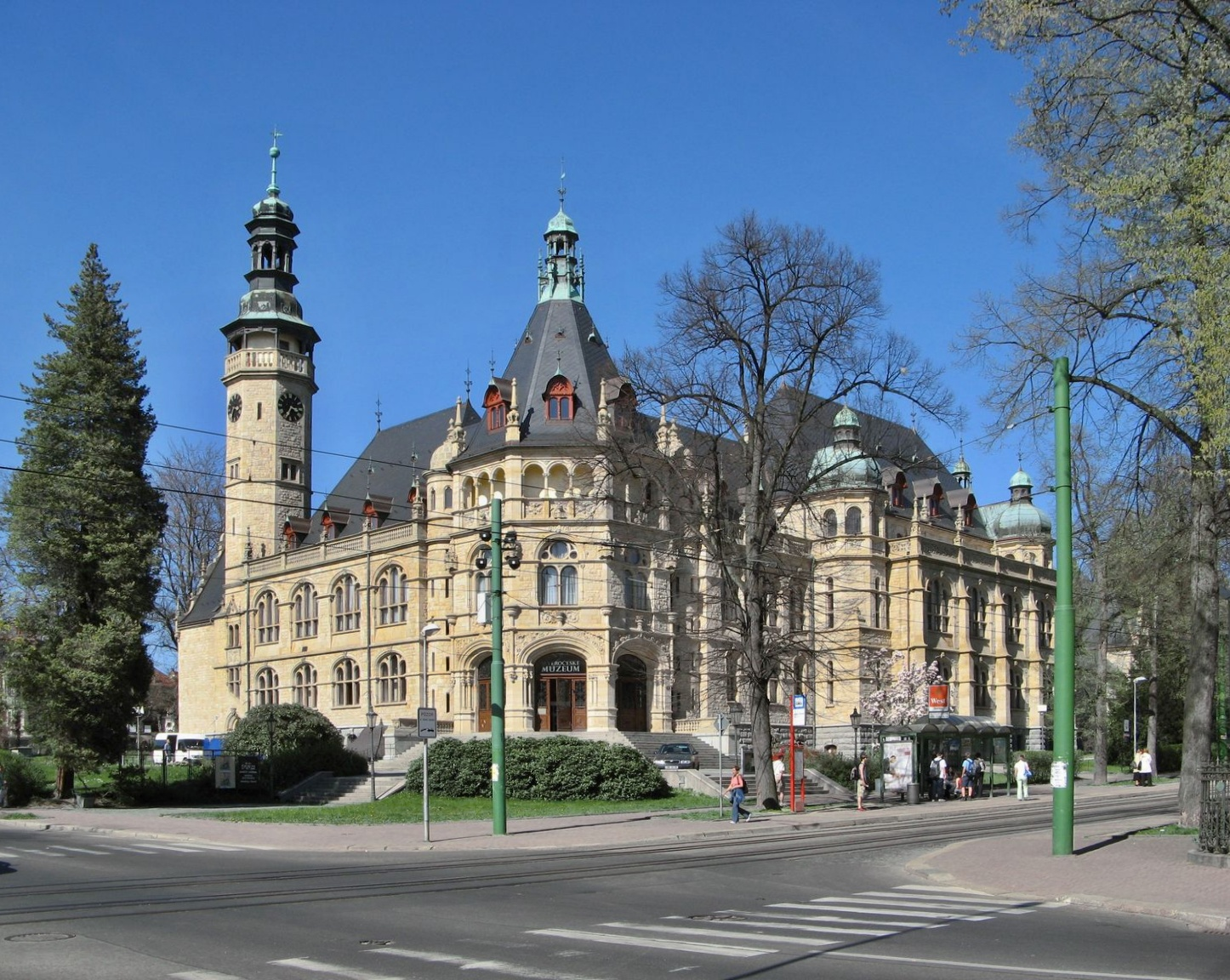
The North Bohemian Museum in Liberec

His father was a building official. In 1877, he began his studies in architecture at the Technical University in Vienna. His professors there included Heinrich von Ferstel and Karl König]. In order to gain more creative training, he enrolled at the Academy of Fine Arts and studied with Friedrich von Schmidt.

From 1889 to 1899, he was a professor of decorative architecture at the Academy of Arts, Architecture and Design in Prague, and was involved in several restoration projects, all while training numerous future architects, including Vladimír Fischer, Bedrich Bendelmeyer, and Álois Dryak. In 1898, together with Josef Hackhofer, he created designs for all the bridges and their associated structures on the Wien River, then returned to Vienna to oversee the construction.

He served as the artistic director for the Neue Hofburg from 1899 to 1907. His projects included the Palmenhaus, a greenhouse near the Burggarten, and the monument to Empress Elisabeth of Austria, in the Volksgarten, with a statue by Hans Bitterlich.

From 1904, he was the head of the master class for architecture at the Fine Arts Academy.

Early in 1918, he presented the first drafts for a large monument dedicated to Emperor Franz Joseph I, which he thought would be a logical addition to the Votivkirhe, but the project was never pursued after the war.

He was given an Ehrengrab ("honorary grave") by the City of Vienna. A street in Vienna's Döbling district is named after him.
