= Oskar Icha =

Austrian sculptor (1886–1945)

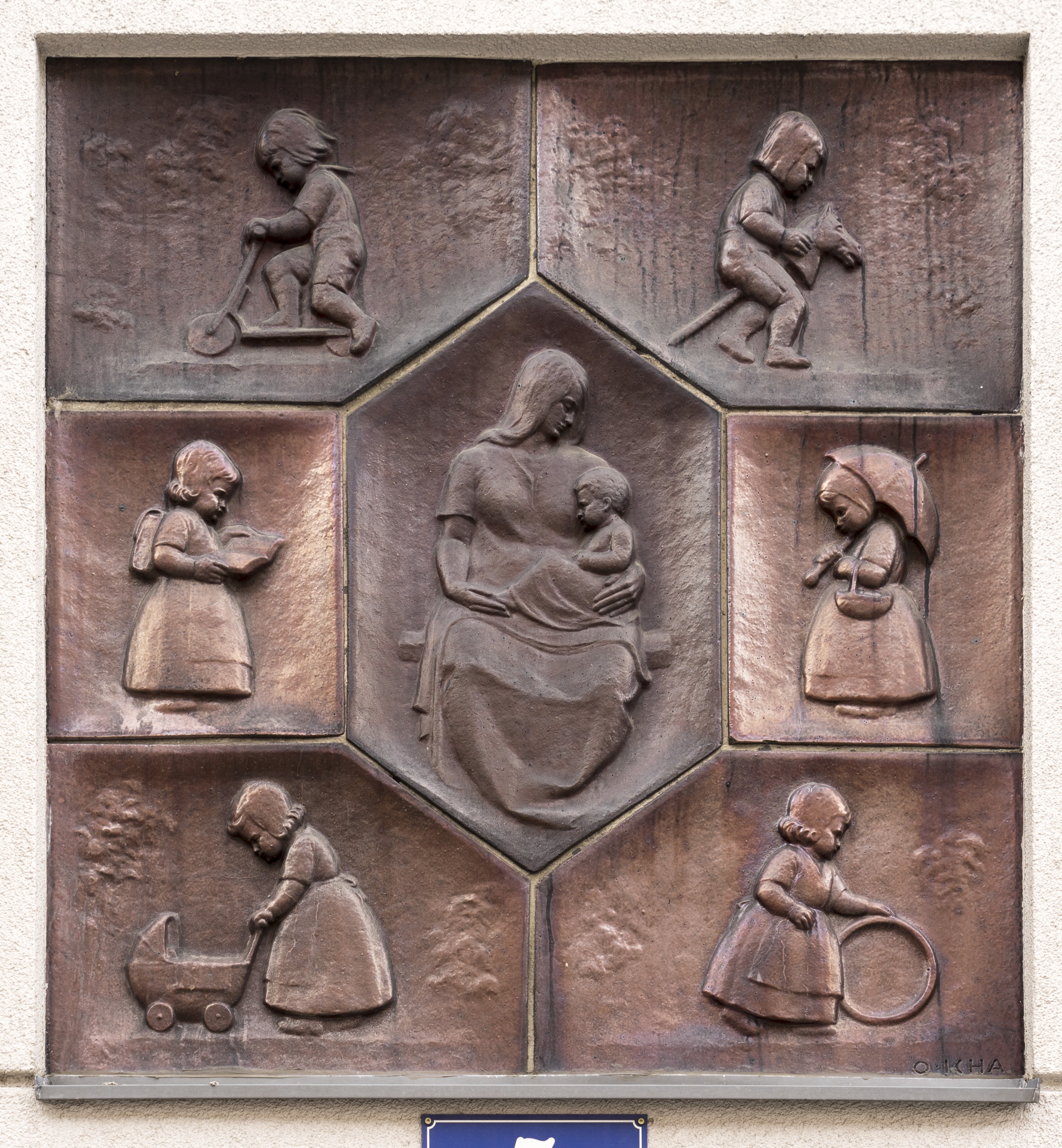
Relief at the residential complex on the Pfenninggeldgasse

Oskar Icha (11 October 1886, Vienna – 1 October 1945, Vienna) was an Austrian sculptor who specialized in reliefs.

== Life and work ==
He studied sculpting at the Academy of Fine Arts, Vienna, where his primary instructor was Anton Hanak. During his time there, he received several awards, including the Academy's Gundel-Prize for excellence. In 1921, he was awarded the Reichel-Prize.

He created several war memorials, notably in Aspern, cemetery sculptures for the funeral hall at the Neustifter Friedhof, and the "Risen Christ" at the Jedleseer Friedhof. In 1927, he created a relief of Beethoven at the Erdődy Estate in Jedlesee which, until 2013, was used as a monument to the composer. In 1930, the city of Vienna commissioned several reliefs for community buildings and, in 1931, he received a gold medal from the Albrecht-Dürer-Bund, an artists' society founded in 1851.

In 1935, he took part in a competition for a monument to labor on the Schmerlingplatz and, the following year, for one dedicated to Emperor Franz Joseph I. He was a member of the Vienna Kunstgemeinschaft, and participated in their exhibitions at the Palmenhaus.

He committed suicide in 1945, and was interred at the Jedleseer Friedhof. In 1971, a street in Vienna's Donaufeld district was named after him.
