= Palmenhaus (Burggarten) =

Building in Vienna

Palm House
- Palmenhaus
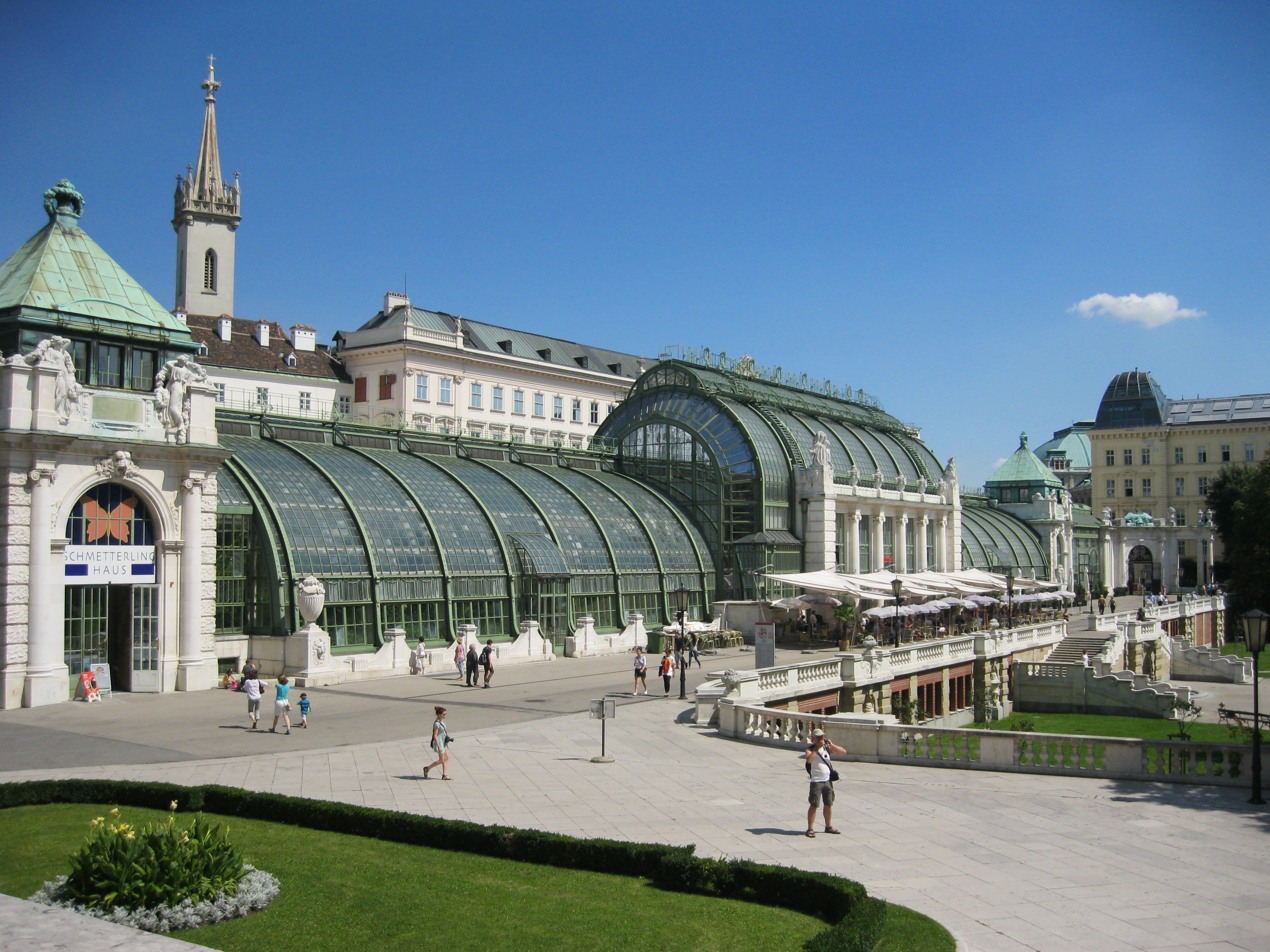
- The Palmenhaus in the Burggarten is a popular meeting place in summer
- Interactive map of the Palm House area

General information
- Type: Greenhouse, restaurant, and butterfly house
- Architectural style: Jugendstil
- Location: Vienna, Austria
- Coordinates: 48°12′17.92″N 16°22′1.1″E
- Construction started: 1901
- Completed: 1905

Height
- Height: 28 m (92 ft)

Dimensions
- Other dimensions: Length: 180 m (590 ft); Width: 13 m (43 ft)

Technical details
- Floor area: 2,050 m^{2} (22,100 sq ft)

Design and construction
- Architect: Friedrich Ohmann
- Other designers: Josef Václav Myslbek; Edmund Hellmer; Rudolf Weyr

The Palmenhaus (Palm House), also known as the Glashaus (Glass House), is a building in the Innere Stadt district of Vienna. It is located on the edge of the Burggarten near the Albertina and the State Opera. It is 180 metres long and 13 metres wide, and has a floor area of around 2,050m².

== History ==
The original classical greenhouse was built between 1823 and 1826 according to designs by Ludwig von Remy and was architecturally based on the Orangerie in Schönbrunn. The rear wall of the building was part of the Vienna City Wall. The greenhouse was demolished around the turn of the 20th century and a new building, influenced by the Jugendstil movement, was built in 1901–1905 to designs by the court architect Friedrich Ohmann. The decorations in the central section (vases, female figures with wreaths, small boys) are by Josef Václav Myslbek, Edmund Hellmer and Rudolf Weyr.

From 1919 to 1938, the Palmenhaus was the seat and exhibition space of the Vienna Kunstgemeinschaft, an association of artists.

In 1988 the building was closed for security reasons, and from 1996 to 1998 a general renovation costing around 13 million euros was carried out. In 1998 the Palmenhaus was finally reopened. The middle part is used as a restaurant, the left wing houses the Butterfly House, the right wing is used by the Austrian Federal Gardens authority as a greenhouse.

== Gallery ==
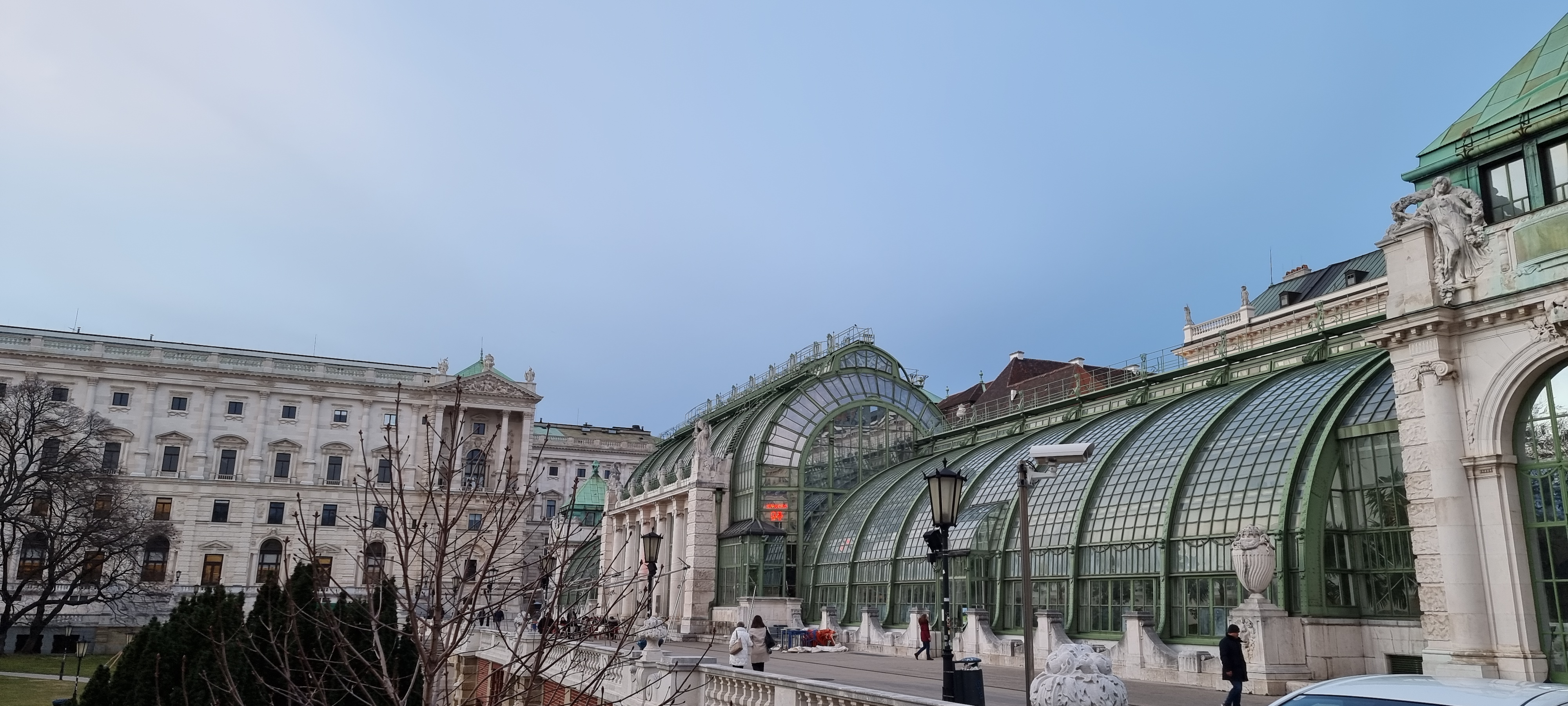
The left end of the Palmenhaus

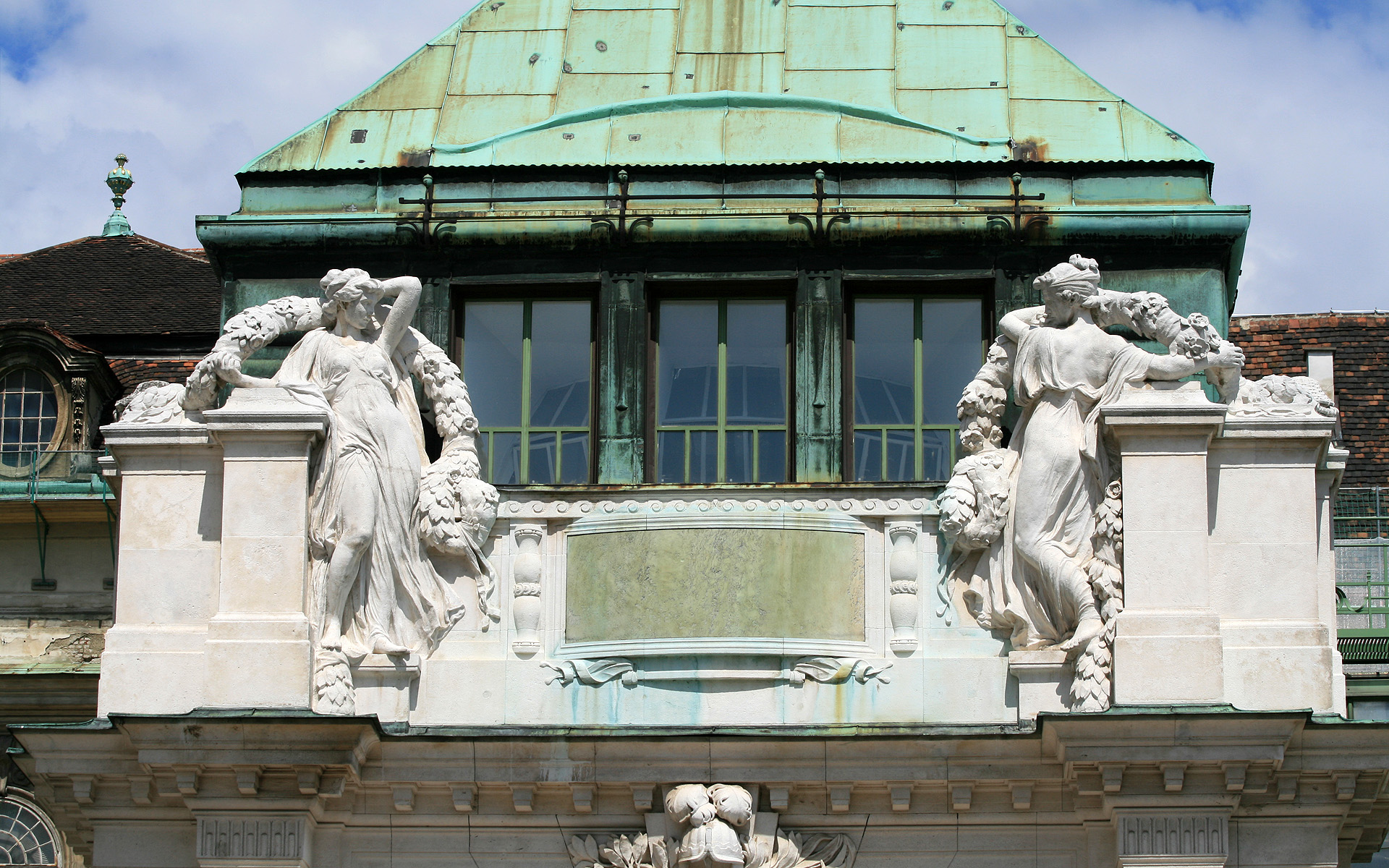
Detail of the Jugendstil facade

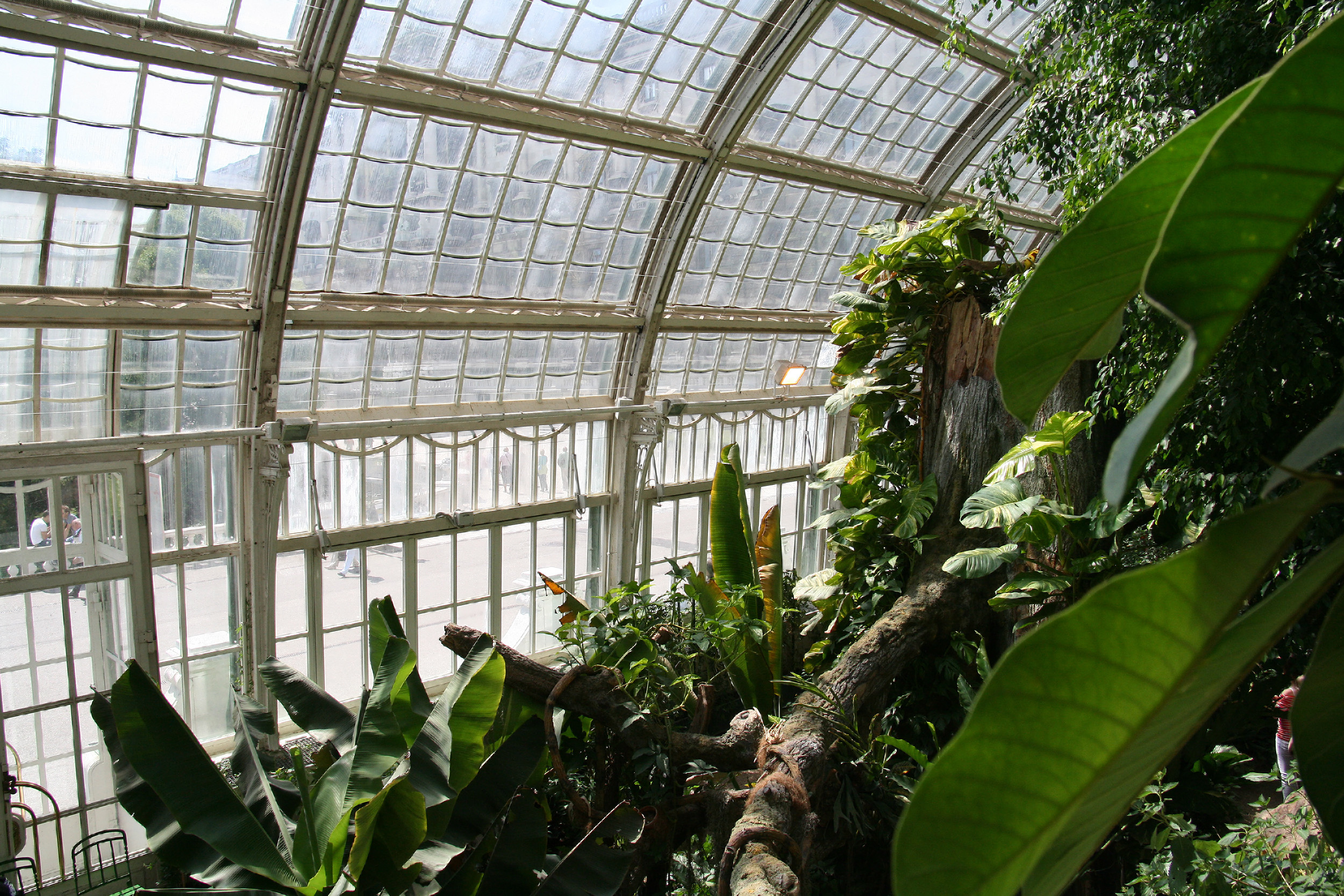
Inside view of the Butterfly House
