= Villa Primavesi =

Building in Olomouc, Czech Republic

- Vila Primavesi (Czech)
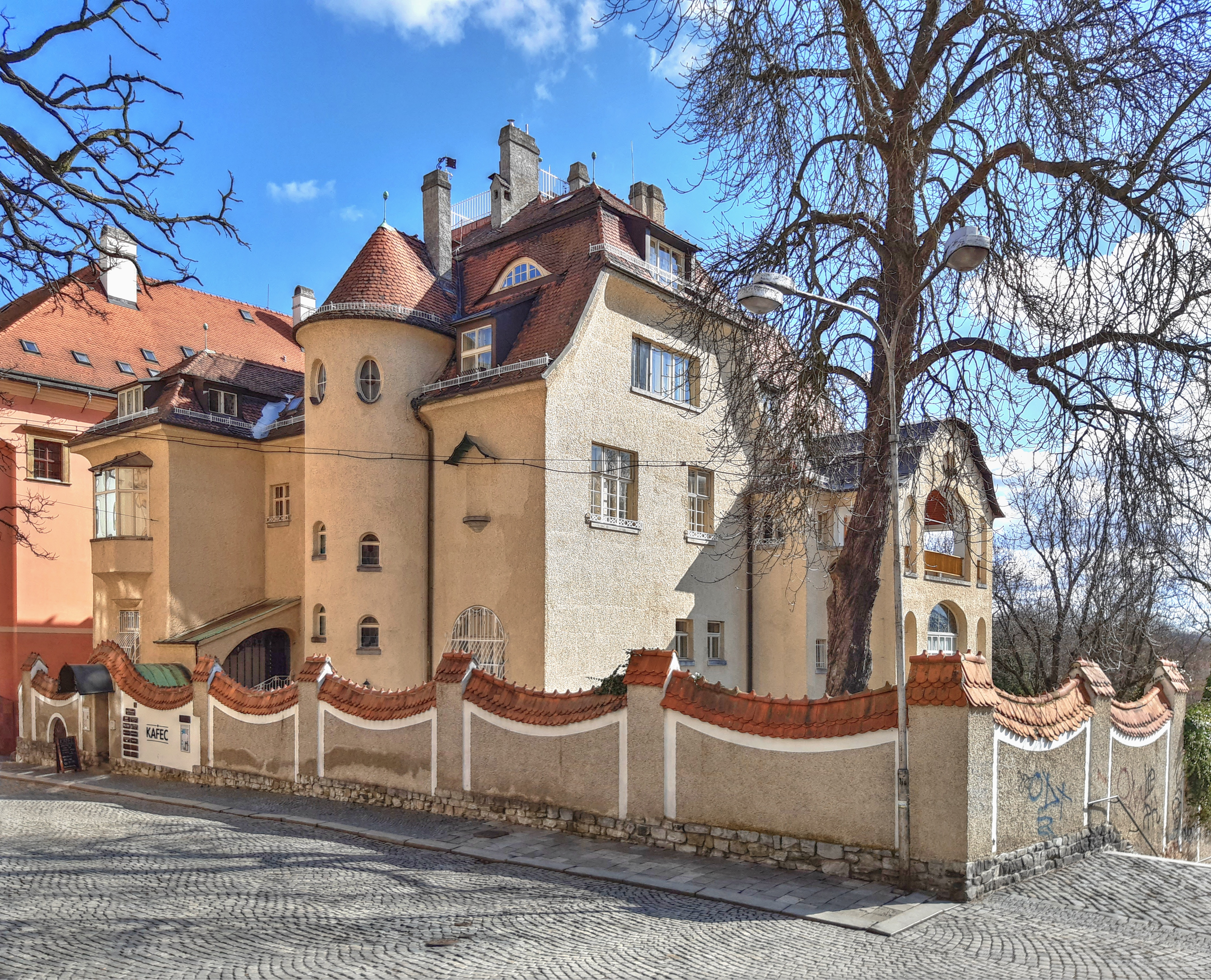
- Street façade of the villa
- Interactive map of the Villa Primavesi area

General information
- Type: Private house
- Architectural style: Vienna Secession
- Location: Univerzitní 7, Olomouc, Czech Republic
- Coordinates: 49°35′38.76″N 17°15′18.72″E
- Construction started: 1905
- Completed: 1906
- Client: Otto and Eugenie Primavesi

Design and construction
- Architects: Franz von Krausse, Josef Tölk
- Other designers: Anton Hanak, Josef Hoffmann, Gustav Klimt

The Villa Primavesi (Czech: Vila Primavesi) is an Art Nouveau building in Olomouc, Czech Republic. It was designed for Otto Primavesi, a wealthy merchant-banker and his wife Eugenia née Butschek, a Viennese actress.

== Protection ==
The villa is a listed national cultural monument.

== Gallery ==
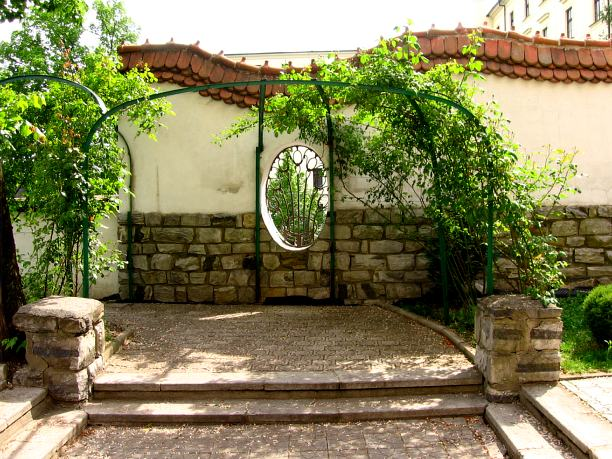
Pergola with roses in the garden

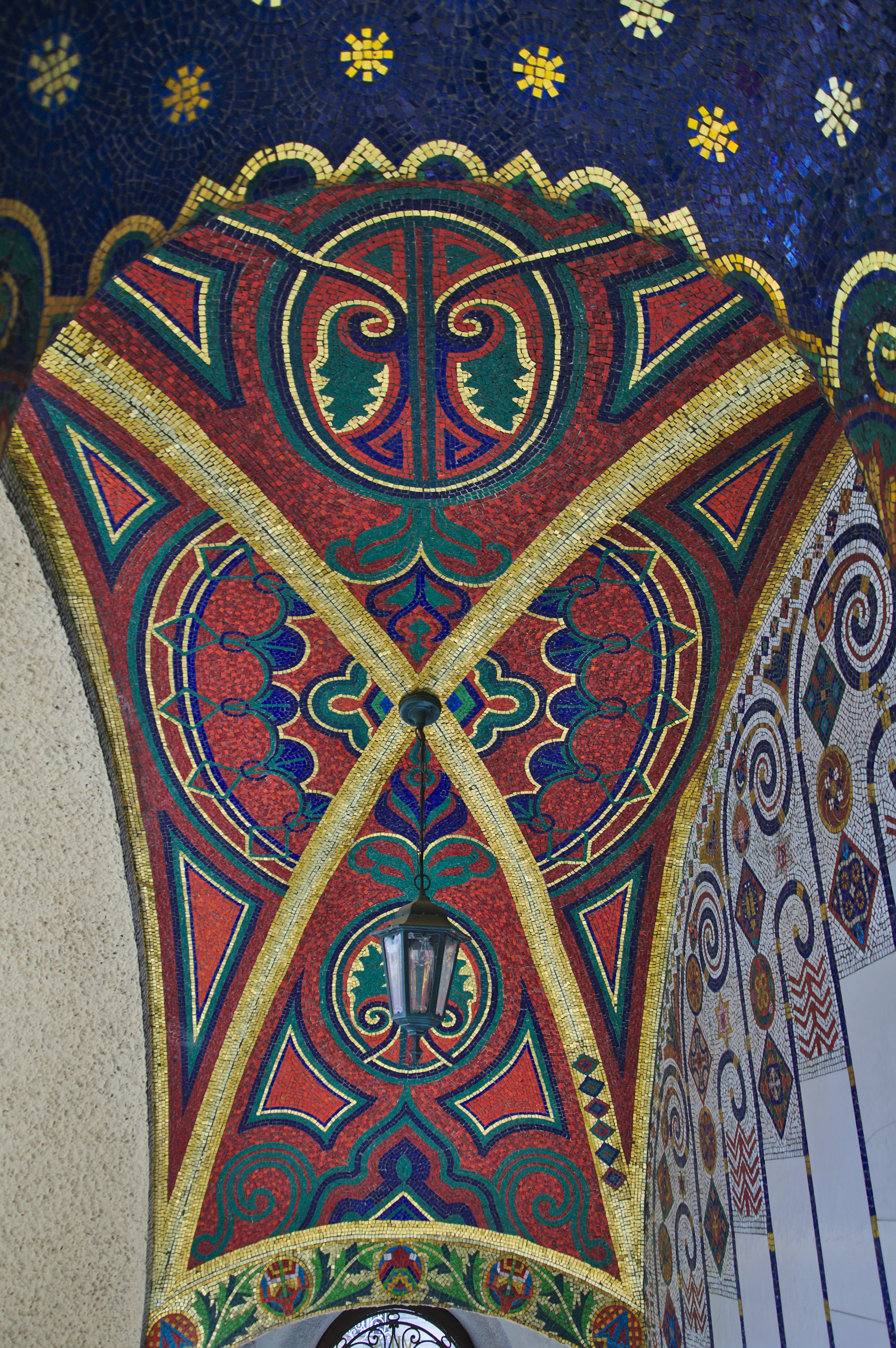
Mosaic above the main entrance

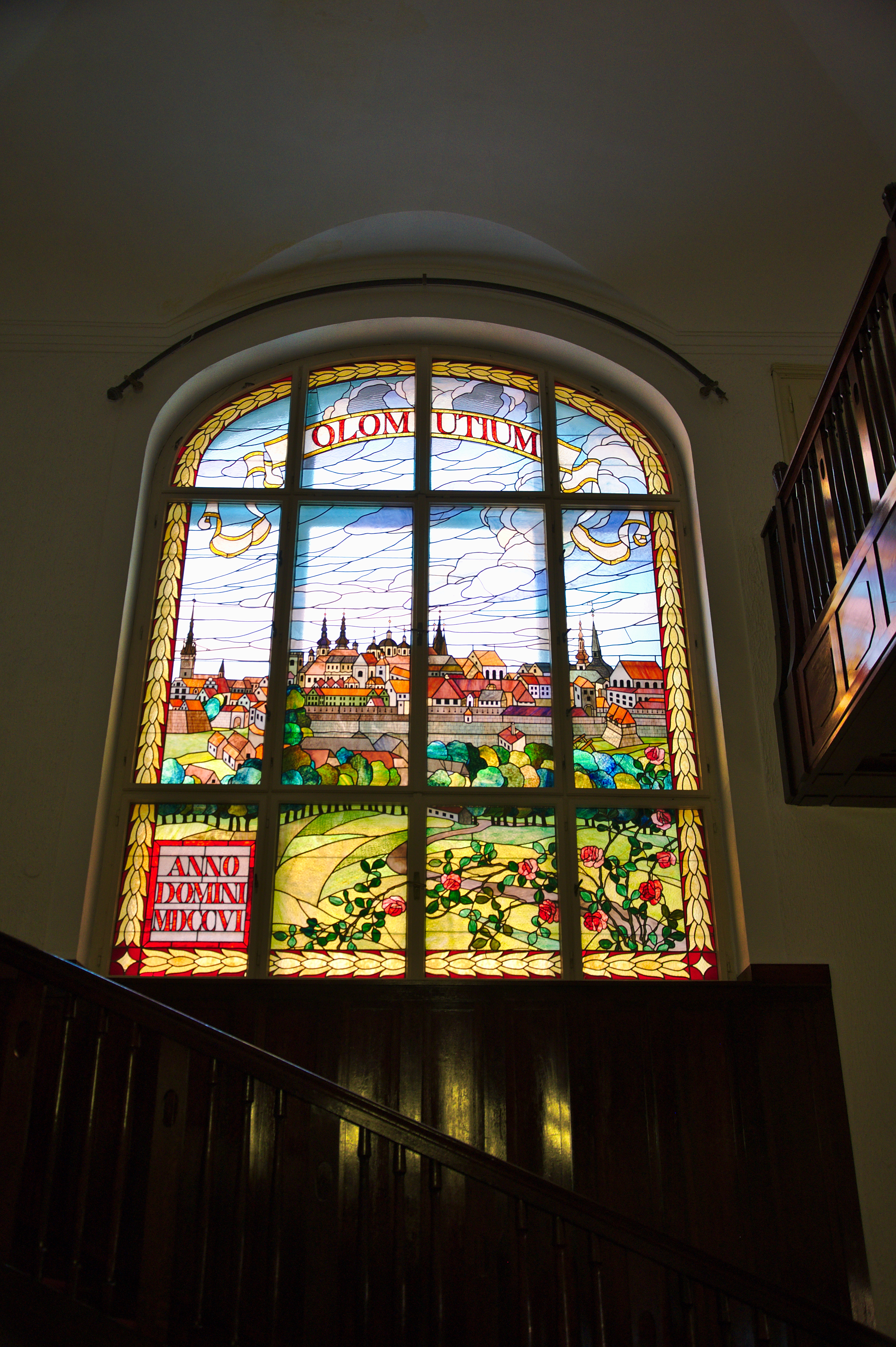
Stained glass with the image of Olomouc in the living room

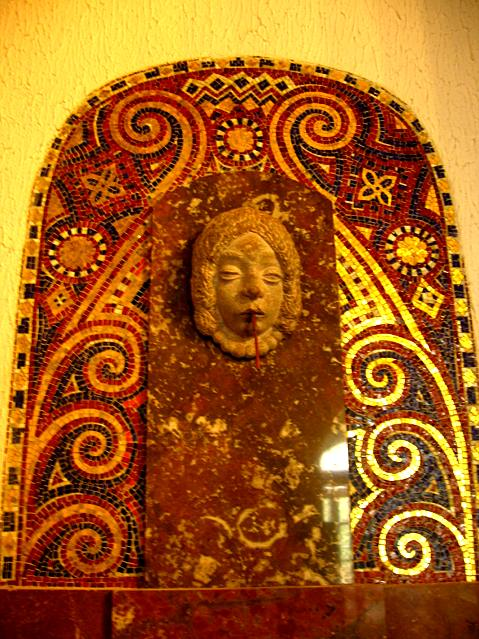
Mosaic fountain in the living hall

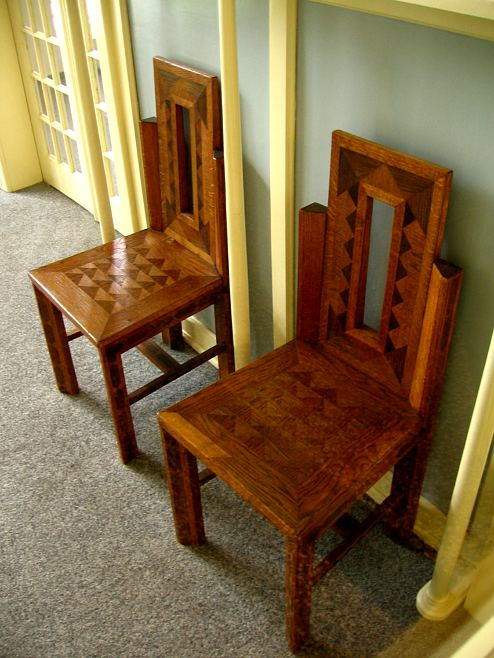
Original Art Nouveau chair from the Wiener Werkstätte

== Literature ==
- Zatloukal, Pavel: Vila Primavesi v Olomouci [Vila Primavesi in Olomouc], Olomouc 1990 ISBN 80-85034-03-4.
- Zatloukal, Pavel: Příběhy z dlouhého století [Stories from the long century], Olomouc 2002 ISBN 80-85227-49-5, pp. 507–519
