= Pepi Weixlgärtner-Neutra =

Austrian-Swedish sculptor and painter

Josephine Therese Weixlgärtner-Neutra
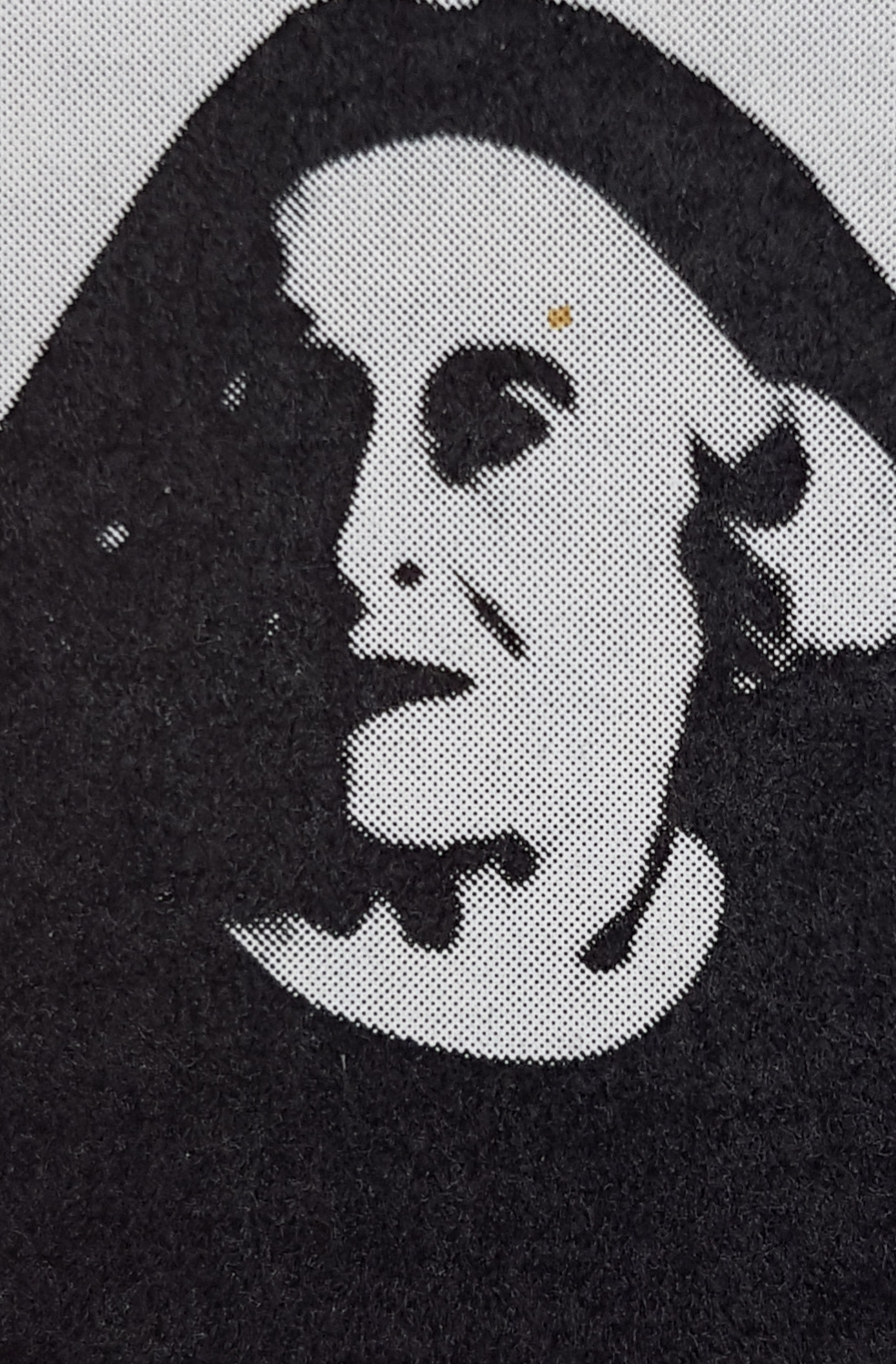
- Born: Josephine Therese Neutra; 19 January 1886; Vienna, Austria
- Died: 1981 (aged 94–95); Gothenburg, Sweden
- Other name: Pepi Weixlgärtner-Neutra
- Occupations: Sculptor and painter
- Spouse: Arpad Weixlgärtner
- Children: Elisabeth Söderberg; Johannes Weixlgärtner
- Parents: Samuel Neutra (father); Elisabeth Glaser (mother)

Josephine Therese (Pepi) Weixlgärtner-Neutra (born 19 January 1886 in Vienna – died 1981 in Gothenburg) was an Austrian-Swedish artist, who concentrated on graphic design, painting, sculpture and enamelwork.

== Life ==
Known as Pepi and born in Austria in 1886, she was the daughter of wealthy factory owners Samuel Neutra and Elisabeth Glaser and was the eldest sister of the Austrian-American architect Richard Neutra. In 1908, she married the prominent art historian and museum director Arpad Weixlgärtner (1872–1961) and the couple had two children, Elisabeth Söderberg (1912–1991) and Johannes Weixlgärtner.

Weixlgärtner-Neutra studied sculpture with Anton Hanak at the Kunstgewerbeschule in Vienna and also pursued her art studies while traveling to a dozen countries in Europe.

=== From sculpture to graphics ===
She started as a sculptor but in the 1920s she began a switch to graphics. Weixlgärtner-Neutra soon became well known for her graphic prints and produced them with techniques such as lithography and woodcuts. During the 1920s, she published three acclaimed graphic folders in lithography and soft ground etching.

During her years in Vienna, she participated in many exhibitions with the artist group Secessionen. Her art generally consists of nudes, nature student figure pictures, portraits and enamel painting on copper.

Until the Second World War, she was active in Vienna but after her home was destroyed by fire, along with all of her private belongings, graphic plates and printed works, she and her husband moved to Sweden in 1945 at the invitation of King Gustav VI Adolf. Their daughter had already moved there in 1939.

In Sweden, she exhibited at Lorensbergs art salon, Tidningen's exhibition hall, The Academy of Fine Arts and in Lund, Malmö, Eskilstuna, Karlstad, Örebro and Linköping.

In the 1960s, Weixlgärtner-Neutra became interested in color enamel techniques and pursued joint projects with her daughter Elisabeth Söderberg-Weixlgärtner. The artists exhibited their artwork together at Frankfurt's Museum für Kunsthandwerk (now known as the Museum Angewandte Kunst).

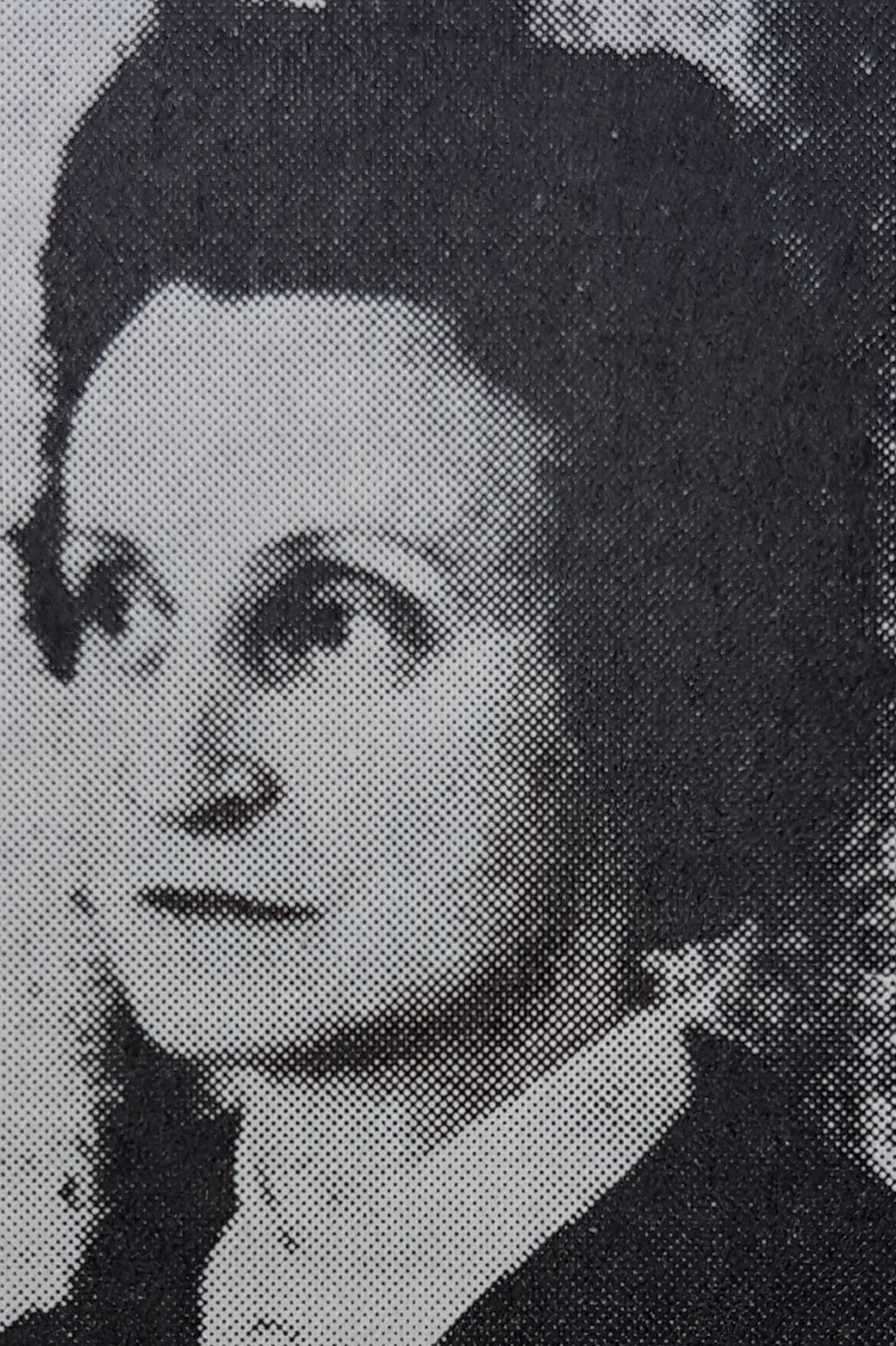
Portrait of daughter Elisabeth Söderberg-Weixlgärtner.

Weixlgärtner-Neutra also had solo exhibitions in Copenhagen, Oslo, Trondheim, New Orleans, Washington, Los Angeles, Santa Barbara, Aachen, and some with her daughter in Norrköping and Rome.

=== Exhibits ===
Her work is held at many museums including: Moderna Museet, Gothenburg Museum of Art, Malmö museum, Örebro läns museum, Eskilstuna museum, Värmlands museum, Östergötland museum, National Gallery of Denmark, National Gallery of Oslo, Ateneum in Helsinki, Smithsonian American Art Museum and National Gallery of Art in Washington, D.C., Museum of Modern Art in New York, British Museum in London, Albertina in Vienna and the Biobliothèque Nationale in Paris.

University of California, Los Angeles, special collections, also houses a collection of Weixlgärtner-Neutra's work which includes three oversize folders. They are primarily prints and are titled, Collection of Prints by Pepi Weixlgärtner-Neutra (Collection 465).

=== Later years ===
According to the Jewish Women's Archive, Weixlgärtner-Neutra was a Jew. Over her lifetime, she became known by a variety of names including, Josephine Therese Neutra, Josefine Neutra, Josephine Weixlgärtner, Pepi Weixlgärtner and Pepi Neutra.

In 1981, she died in Gothenburg, Sweden.
