= Arpad Weixlgärtner =

Austrian art historian (1872–1961)

- Born: 6 February 1872; Vienna, Austro-Hungarian Empire
- Died: 2 February 1961 (aged 88); Gothenburg, Sweden
- Education: University of Vienna (PhD 1899)
- Occupations: Art historian, Director of Kunsthistorische Museum
- Years active: 1900–1938
- Known for: Defying National Socialist regime

Arpad Weixlgärtner (6 April 1872 – 2 February 1961) was an Austrian art historian.

== Early life and education ==
Weixlgärtner was born on 6 April 1872 in Vienna in an artistic family; his father a Hungarian count and his grandfather a landscape painter. He studied law, history, art history and archaeology in Vienna and earned his doctoral degree in 1899 with a dissertation titled Zu Dürers Akt- und Proportionsstudien ("On Dürer's studies of nudes and proportions"). The work was passed with the comment that it was "worth every praise and corresponds fully to the formal requirements".

In 1908, Weixlgärtner married Viennese artist Josephine (Pepi) Neutra (1886–1981). He grew close to his brother-in-law, the famous modern architect Richard Neutra, 20 years his junior, whom he mentored and assisted in his cultural development.

== Career ==
He then began a long career at different museums in Vienna. From 1900 or 1901, he worked at the print room of the Austrian National Library, and from 1906 to 1938 he was tied to the Kunsthistorisches Museum. From 1906 until 1930 he was the curator at the department of plastic arts and decorative arts, and between 1920 and 1938 head of both the secular and ecclesiastical collections of the Imperial Treasury in Vienna. He was director of the department of paintings of the Kunsthistorische Museum between 1931 and 1933 and for a short period in 1933 director of the whole museum. He formally retired in 1934 but kept the position as head of the Treasury until 1938.

== World War II ==
Following the annexation of Austria into Nazi Germany in 1938, Weixlgärtner was forced to quit his position. (Note: One source claims he stayed until 1943.) His wife, Pepi, had Jewish ancestry, which the Nazi regime would not tolerate, and furthermore, he refused to hand over the keys of the Treasury to the SS. In April 1945, at the very end of World War II, the Nazis burnt down his house and he lost all his belongings, including his large library of art history literature, his private collections, and an academic manuscript ready for printing together with the rest of his property; according to his obituary, "he was not able to save even his everyday clothes".

== Postwar ==
For a short while after the war, he was head of the Wagenburg museum in Vienna. Sometime after the war, he was invited to Sweden by King Gustaf VI Adolf. He settled in Gothenburg, where one of his daughters lived, and worked for the rest of his life at different Swedish universities and cooperated with the Swedish History Museum. He died in Gothenburg on 2 February 1961.

He wrote a large number of academic publications, among them a monograph on Austrian painter August von Pettenkofen, a monograph about the Reliquary of St. Elizabeth, a Festschrift for fellow art historian Julius von Schlosser, a thesis about Matthias Grünewald and Albrecht Dürer, and more. Between 1930 and 1938, he was the editor of the yearbook of the Kunsthistorische Museum. In addition, he published two biographical, reflective books, Von den Köstlichkeiten des Lebens (1940) and Von den letzten Dingen (1961).
