= Passau Glass Museum =

Glass museum in Passau, Germany

Coordinates: 48°34′30″N 13°28′06″E

- Passauer Glasmuseum
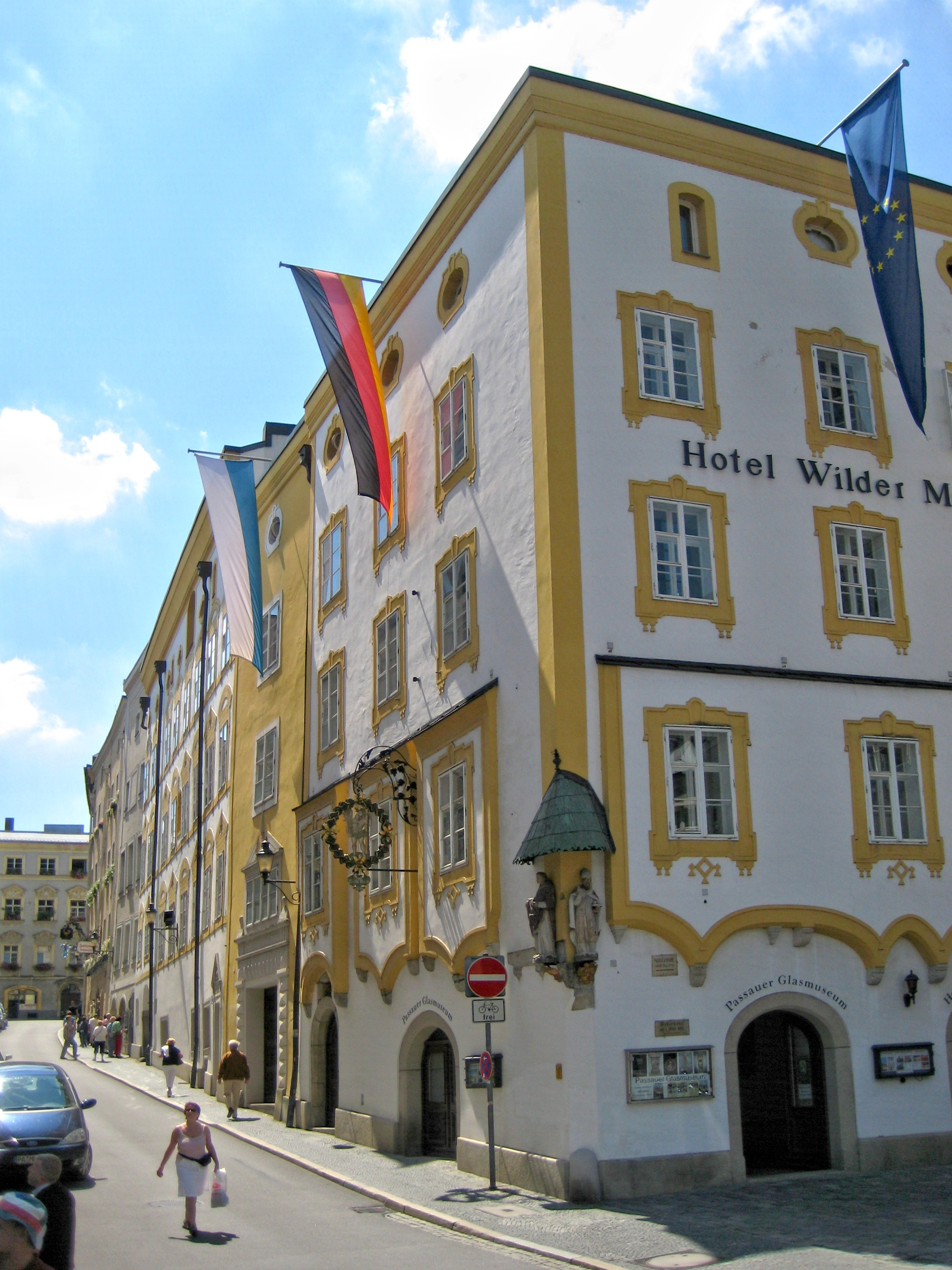
- Passau Glass Museum entrance, Hotel Wilder Mann
- Established: March 15, 1985
- Location: Schrottgasse 2, D-94032 Passau, Germany
- Founder: Georg Hoeltl
- Website: www.glasmuseum.de/home/

The Passau Glass Museum has the largest collections in the world of European art glass, Bohemian glass, and glass made by Johann Loetz. The museum is listed as a "Nationally Valuable Cultural Property". It is located at Schrottgasse 2, D-94032 on the Rathaus or town hall square in the old town of Passau. It is connected to the Hotel Wilder Mann.

The museum was founded by Georg Hoeltl. It covers five floors across four buildings which have been joined together. The top floor, the size of a soccer field, is the first exhibition hall. Hoeltl also owns the Hotel Wilder Mann, to which the museum is attached. The museum was opened on March 15, 1985, with US astronaut Neil Armstrong as the guest of honor.

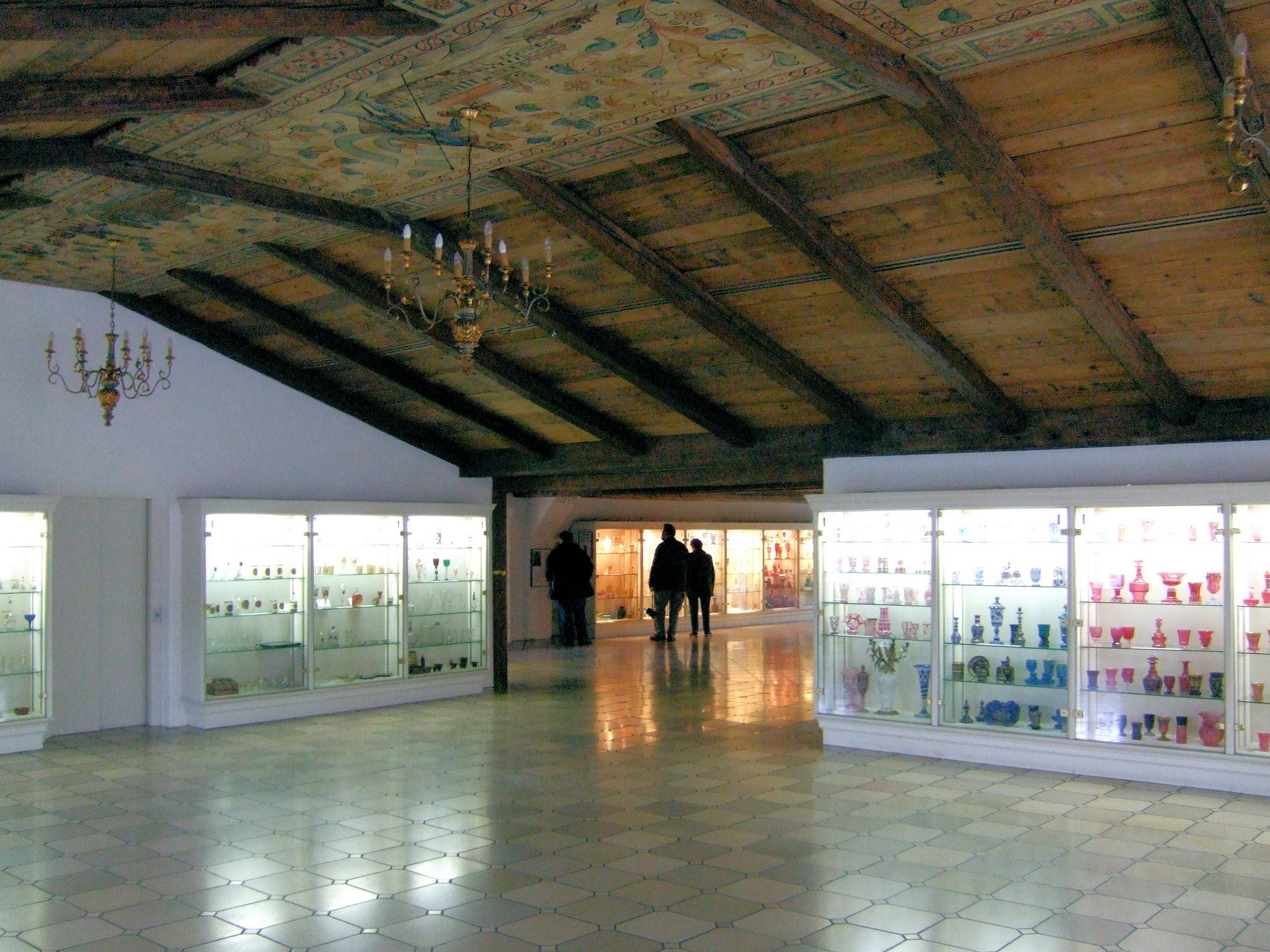
Passau Glass Museum, top floor

The museum's collection of European art glass includes over 30,000 pieces, 17,000 of which are on display. It includes the largest collection in the world of Bohemian glass from Bohemia and Silesia. The areas were rich in silica, limestone, potash and other materials used in making high quality glass. Bohemian glass was made in different styles and often involves crystal engraving, hand enameling, and iridescence. The Passau Glass Museum also includes the largest collection of glass made by Johann Loetz, a Bohemian glassmaker whose highly iridescent work rivals that of Louis Comfort Tiffany.

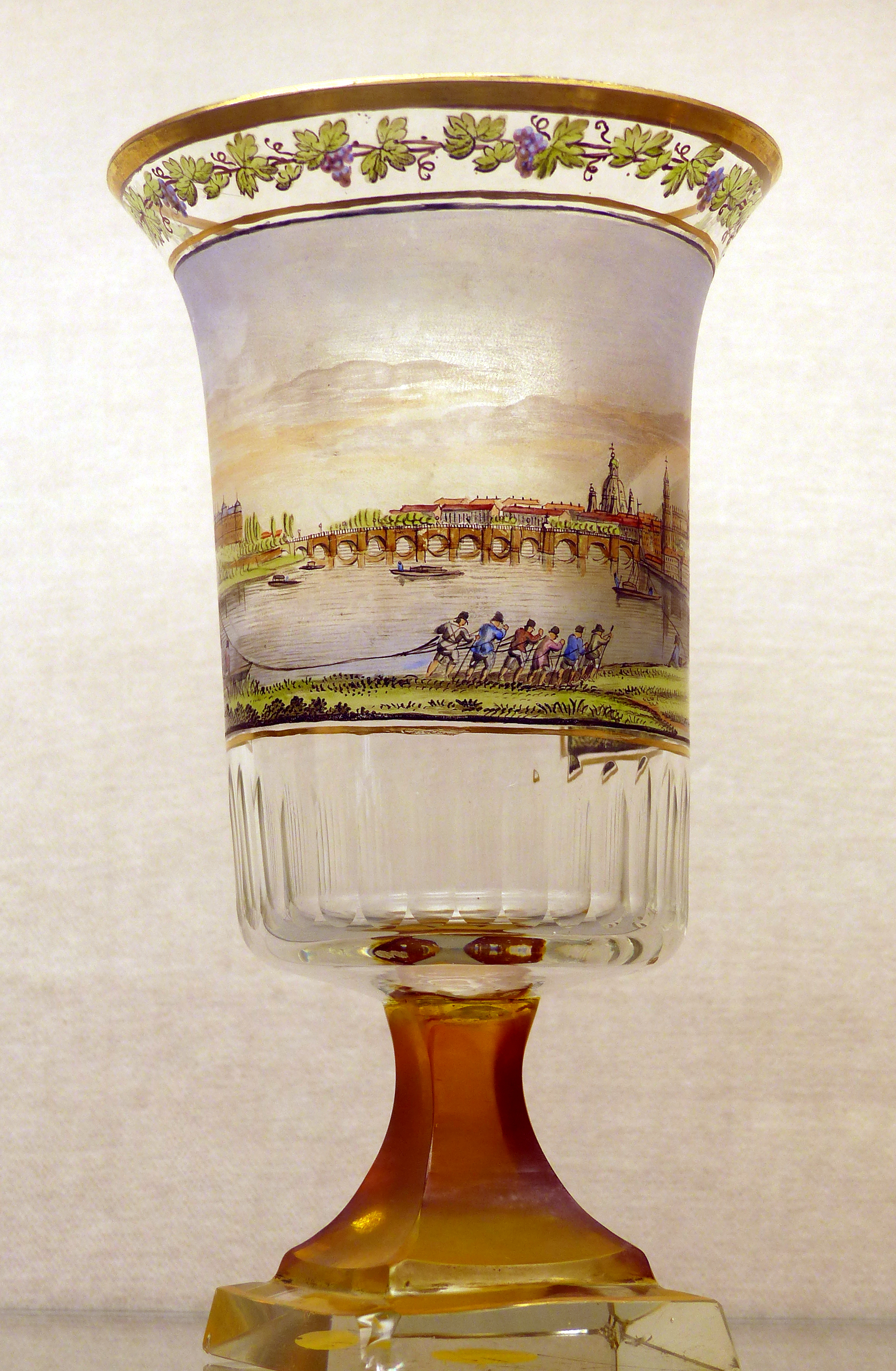
Painted beaker, Biedermeier period

The museum documents the history of glass in 25 rooms spanning 1650 to 1950: 1650 being considered a starting point for glass making as an art form in Europe. Among the rooms are exhibits on the Baroque era (1590-1750), the Empire periods (1650 - 1820), the Biedermeier period (mid-1800s), Classicism, the Historicism period (1850-1895), the Johann Loetz workshop (1880-1940), Ludwig Moser & Sons, Art Nouveau, Art Deco and Modern art styles.
