= Burggarten =

Urban park in Vienna, Austria

Coordinates: 48°12′15″N 16°21′57″E

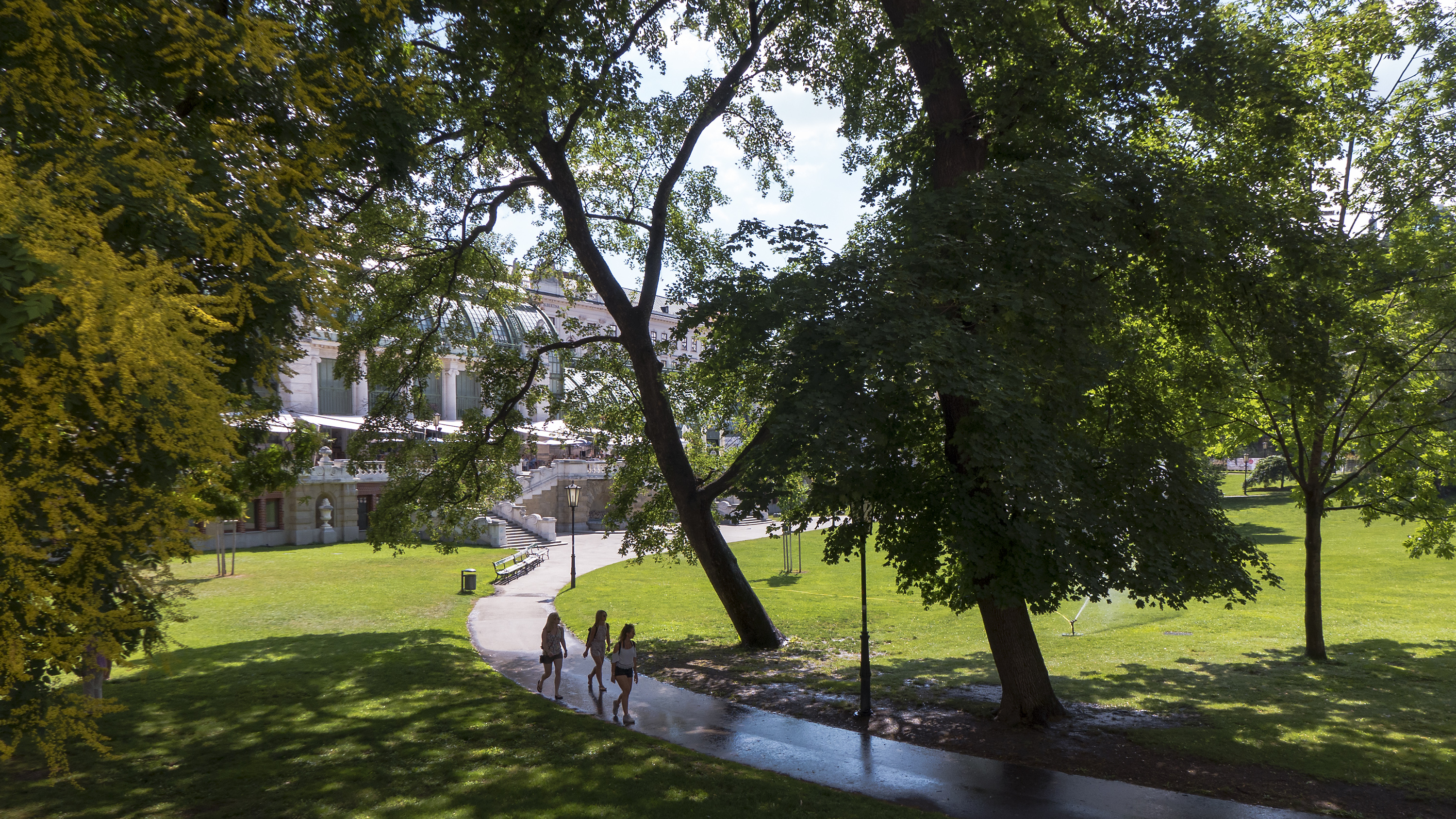
- Interactive map of Burggarten
- Type: Public park
- Location: Innere Stadt, Vienna, Austria
- Area: 4 hectares (9.9 acres)
- Opened: 1919 (public)
- Status: Open year-round
- Website: www.bundesgaerten.at/hofburggaerten/Burggarten.html

The Burggarten is a public park in the Innere Stadt, the first district of Vienna, Austria. The park was built for the royal family after the destruction of the city fortifications by Napoleon.

== History ==
In 1809, following France's decisive victory over Austria in the War of the Fifth Coalition, French troops occupying Vienna destroyed a major defensive bastion of the Hofburg, the Burgbastei. Instead of rebuilding, the area in front of the Hofburg was redesigned. Court architect Ludwig Gabriel von Remy designed what would become a private garden for Francis I, the last Holy Roman Emperor and first Emperor of Austria, who had a keen interest in botany. The park was built by court gardener Franz Antoine the Elder based on Remy's plans; the two also worked on the nearby Volksgarten.

The park was completed in 1820 and was frequently visited by the royal family. Remy erected a large greenhouse in the north of the park. Since the park was separated from the Hofburg, an underground passage, the Laternengang, was constructed to connect the two. In 1863, the park was expanded south-eastwards and surrounded by a fence. The expansion of the Hofburg in the late 19th century slightly reduced the park's size. In 1901, Remy's greenhouse was torn down and replaced by the Palmenhaus.

Following the fall of the monarchy in 1918, the park was nationalized and opened to the public.

In 2021, a small section of the park was converted into paddocks for the Lipizzaner horses of the Spanish Riding School.

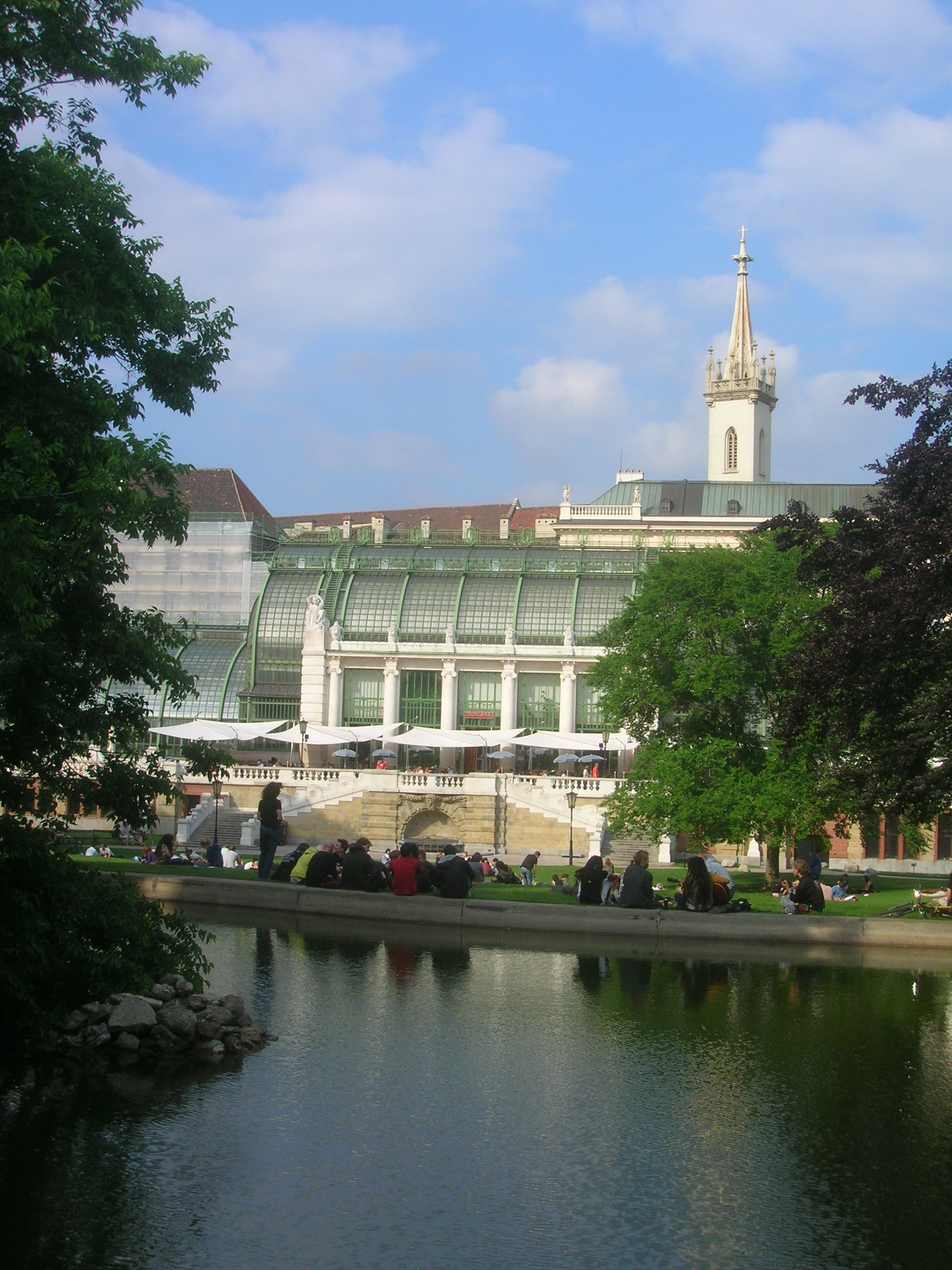
The Palmenhaus from the pond

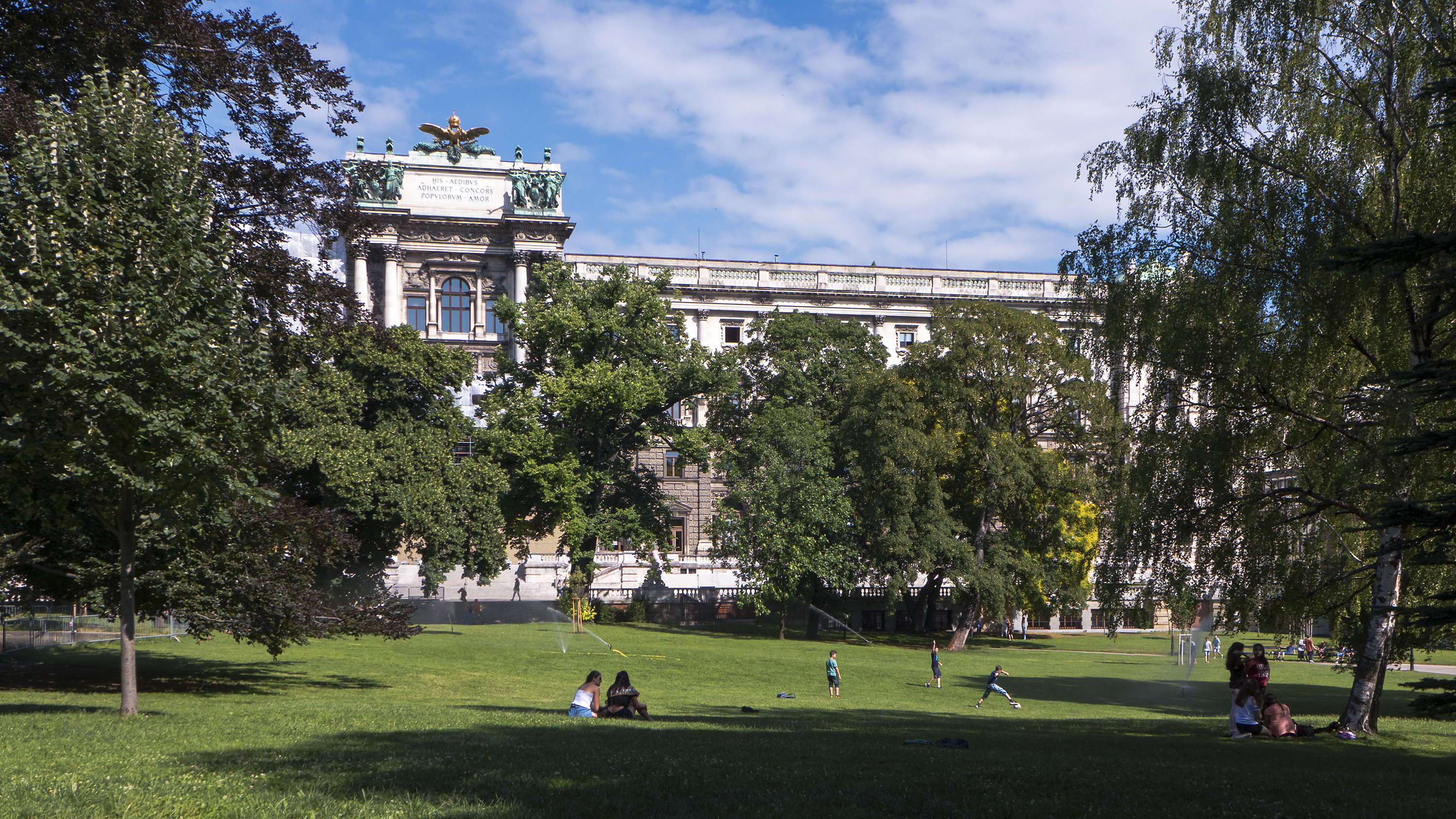
The extended Hofburg

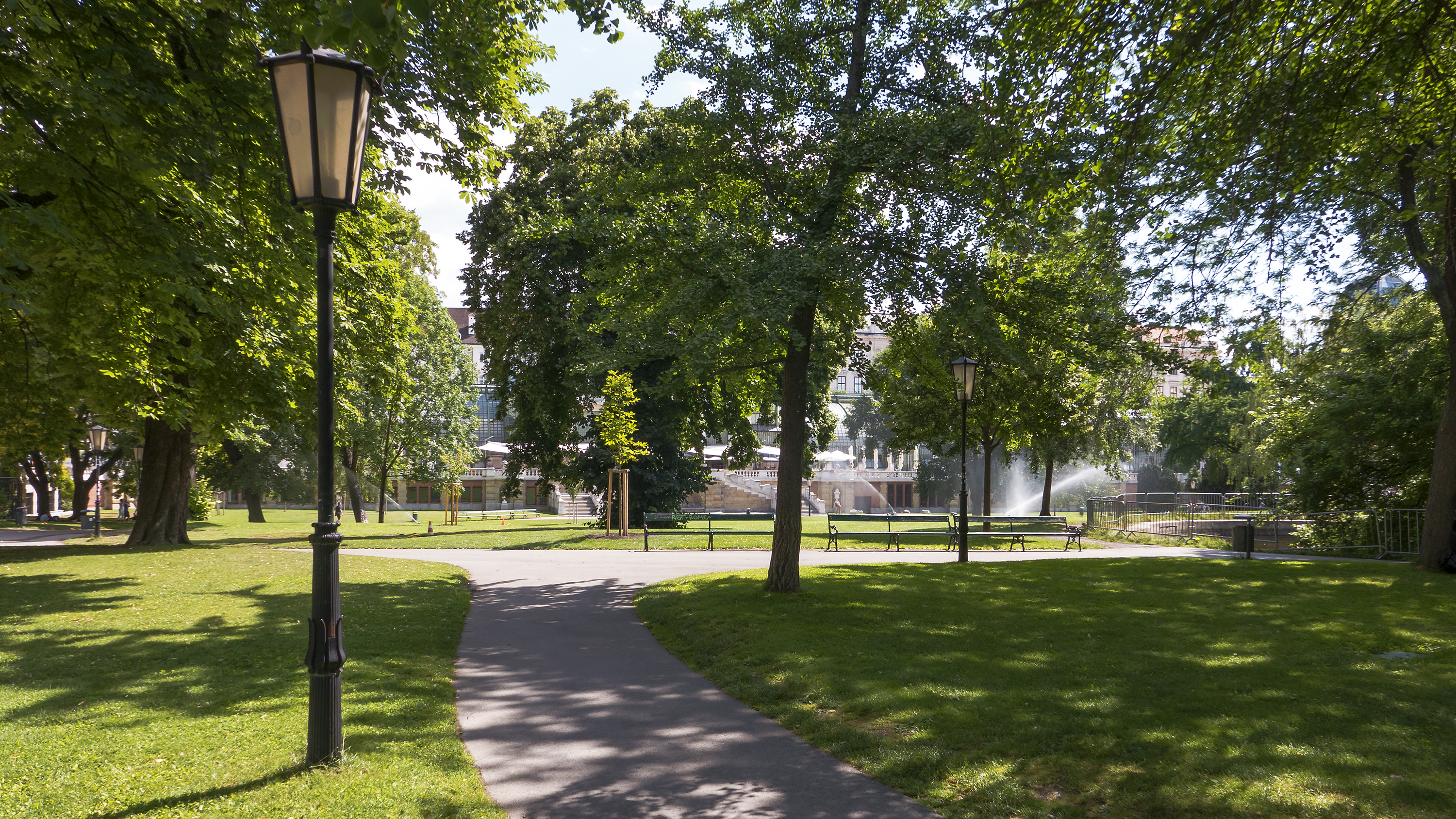
In the park

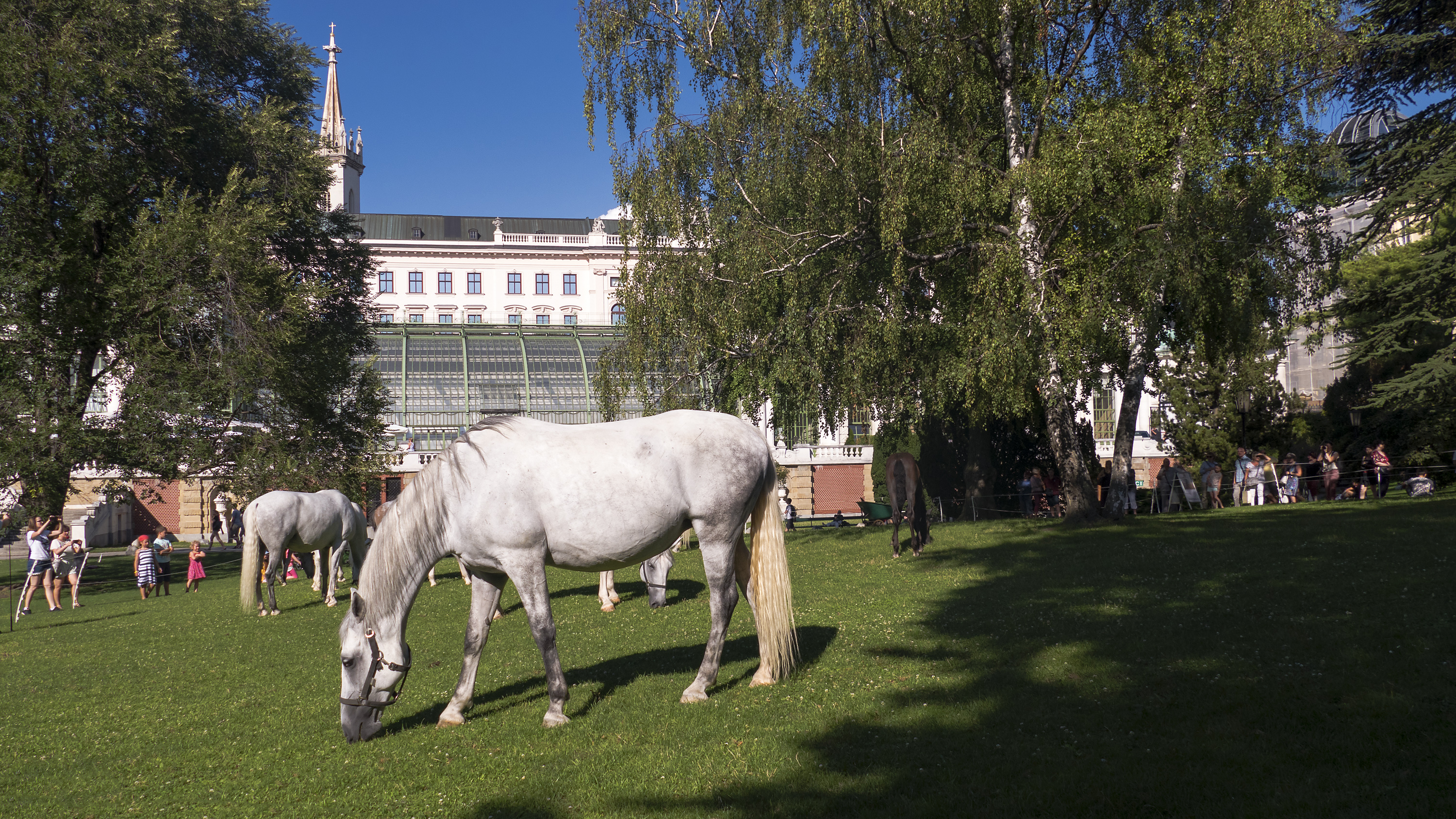
Lipizzaner of the Spanish Riding School

== Buildings ==
The Palmenhaus in the north of the park replaced Remy's original greenhouse. The Jugendstil structure now serves as a greenhouse for the Austrian Federal Gardens, as well as a butterfly house.

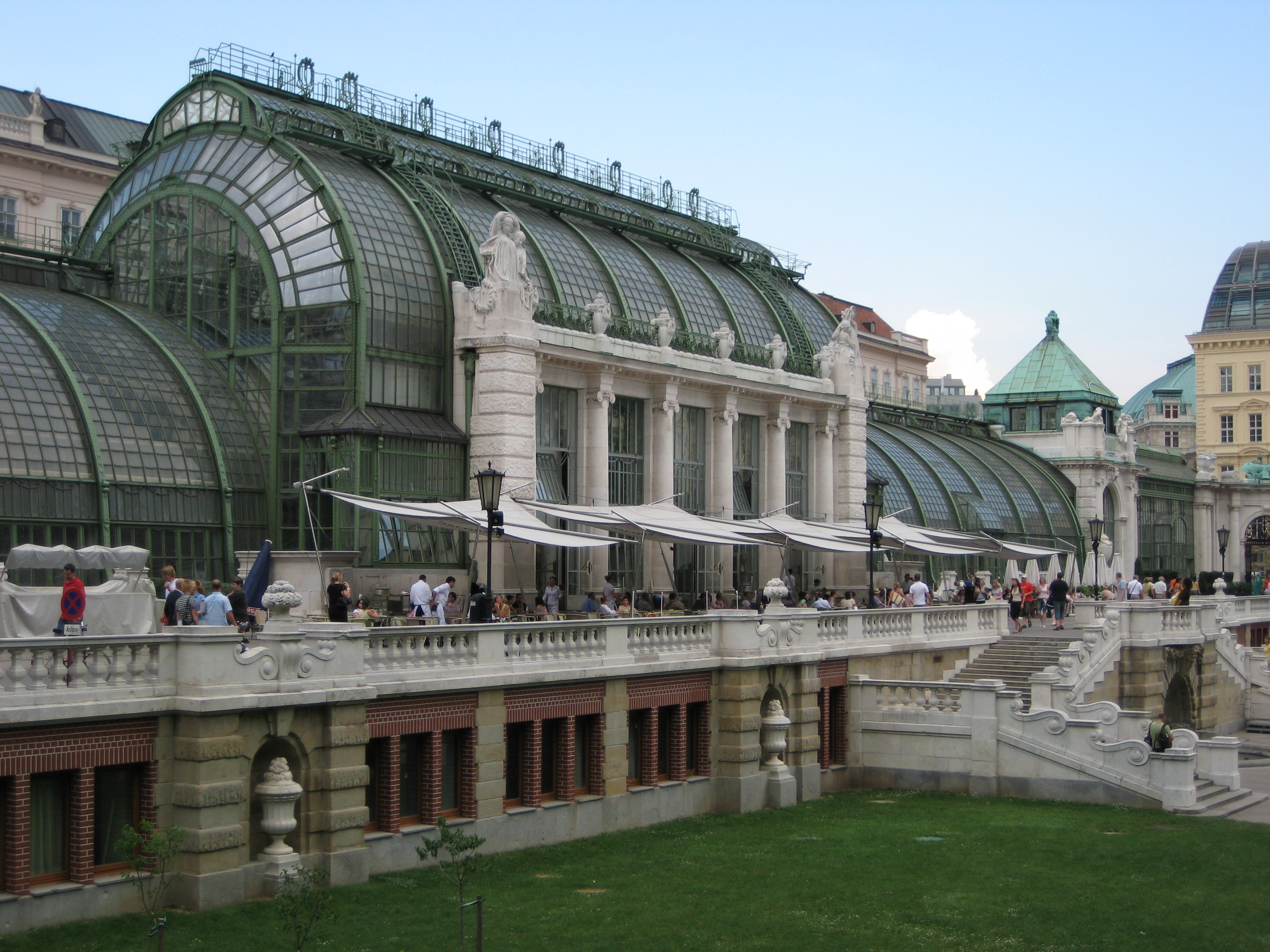
The Palmenhaus

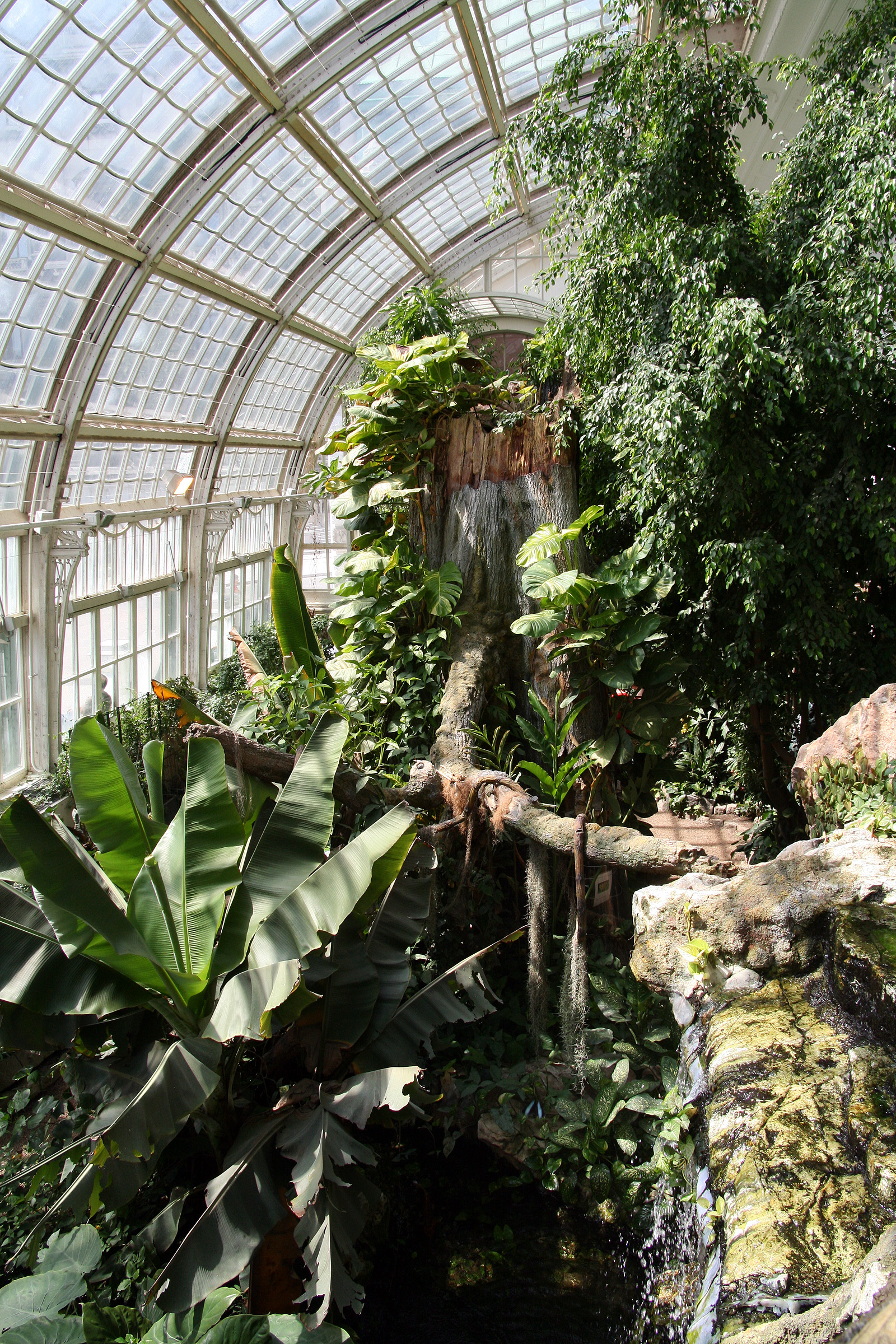
Butterflies in the greenhouse

== Fountain ==
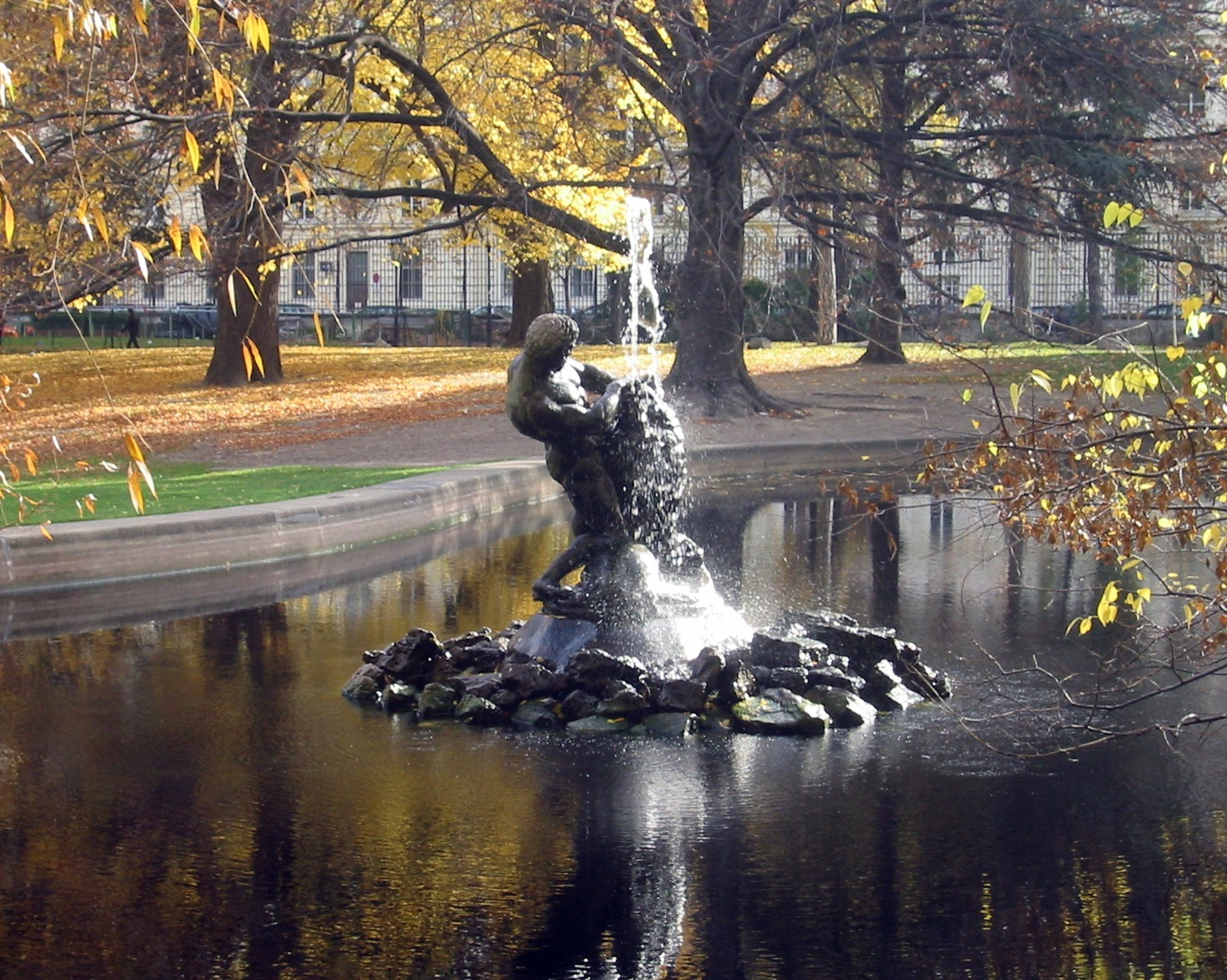
The Hercules fountain

A fountain in the pond features a statue of Hercules and the Nemean Lion. The statue was taken from the Esterházypark in Mariahilf.

== Statues ==
- A statue of Francis I, Holy Roman Emperor and Archduke of Austria. The lead memorial, built in 1781, is the oldest equestrian monument in Vienna.
- A statue of Mozart out of Lasa marble, it had previously stood on the Albertinaplatz and was moved to the park in 1953.
- A statue of Franz Joseph I, which had previously stood in a military building in Penzing, was placed in the park in 1957.
- A statue of Abraham a Sancta Clara, an Augustinian friar.
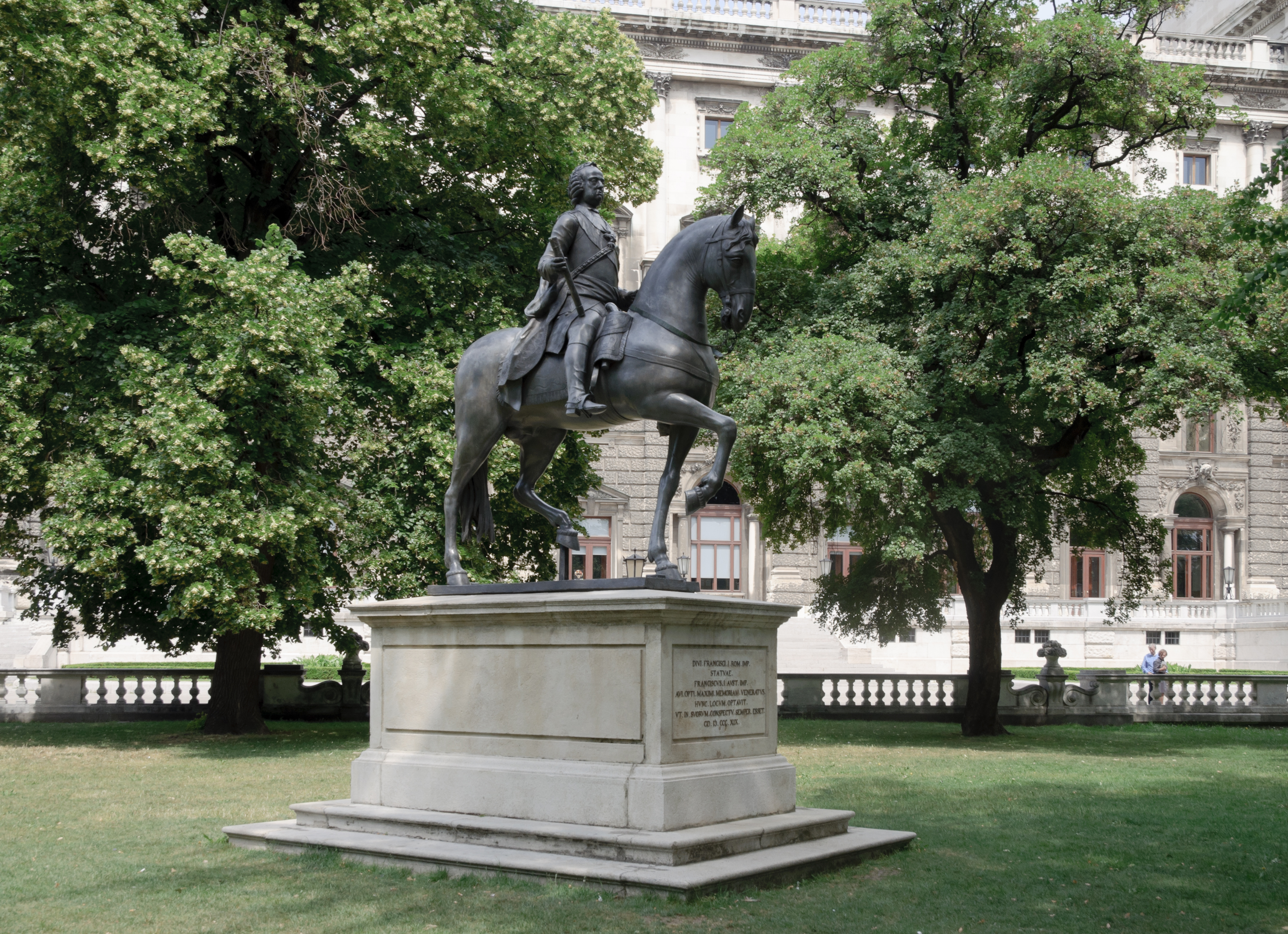
Emperor Franz I

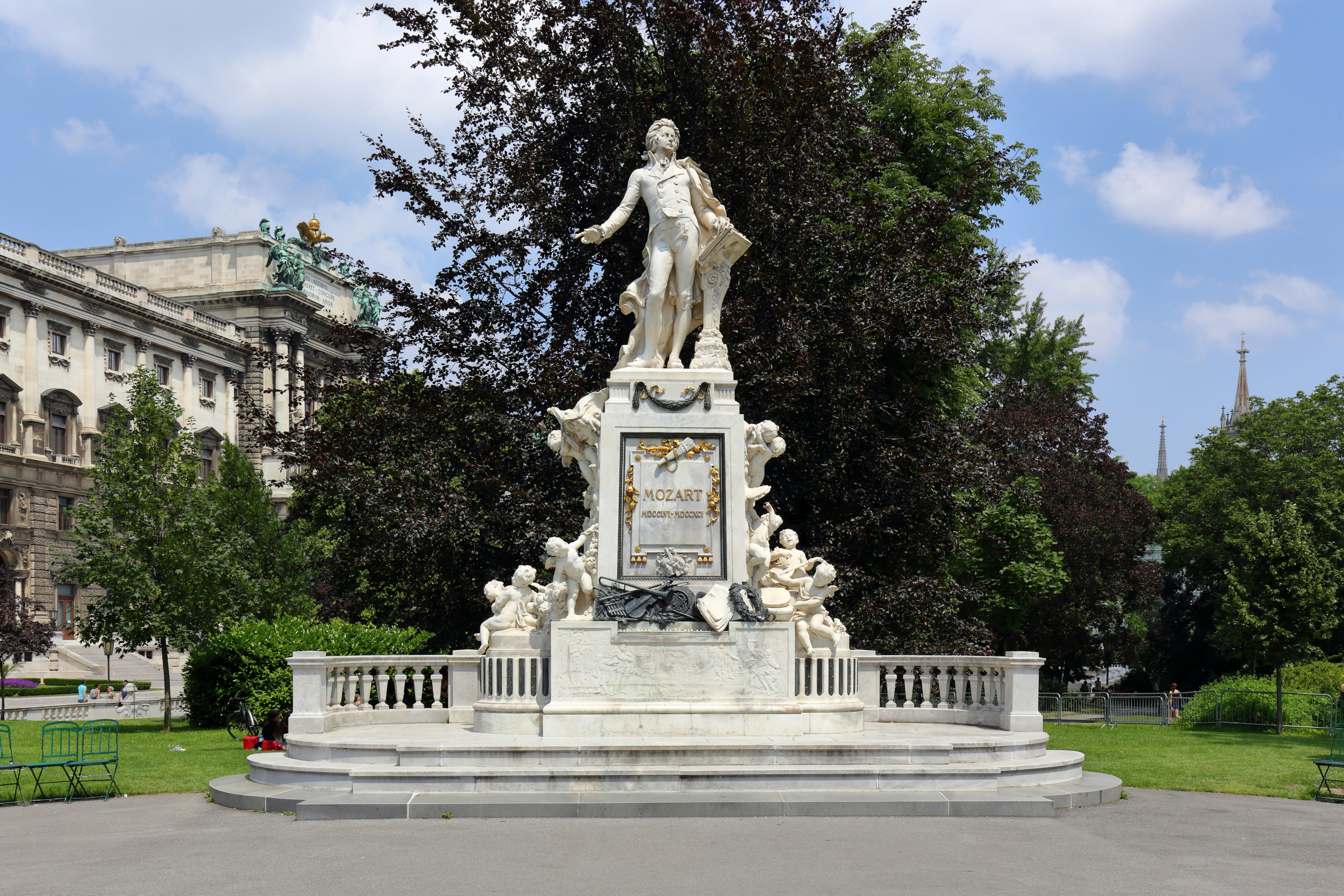
Wolfgang Amadeus Mozart

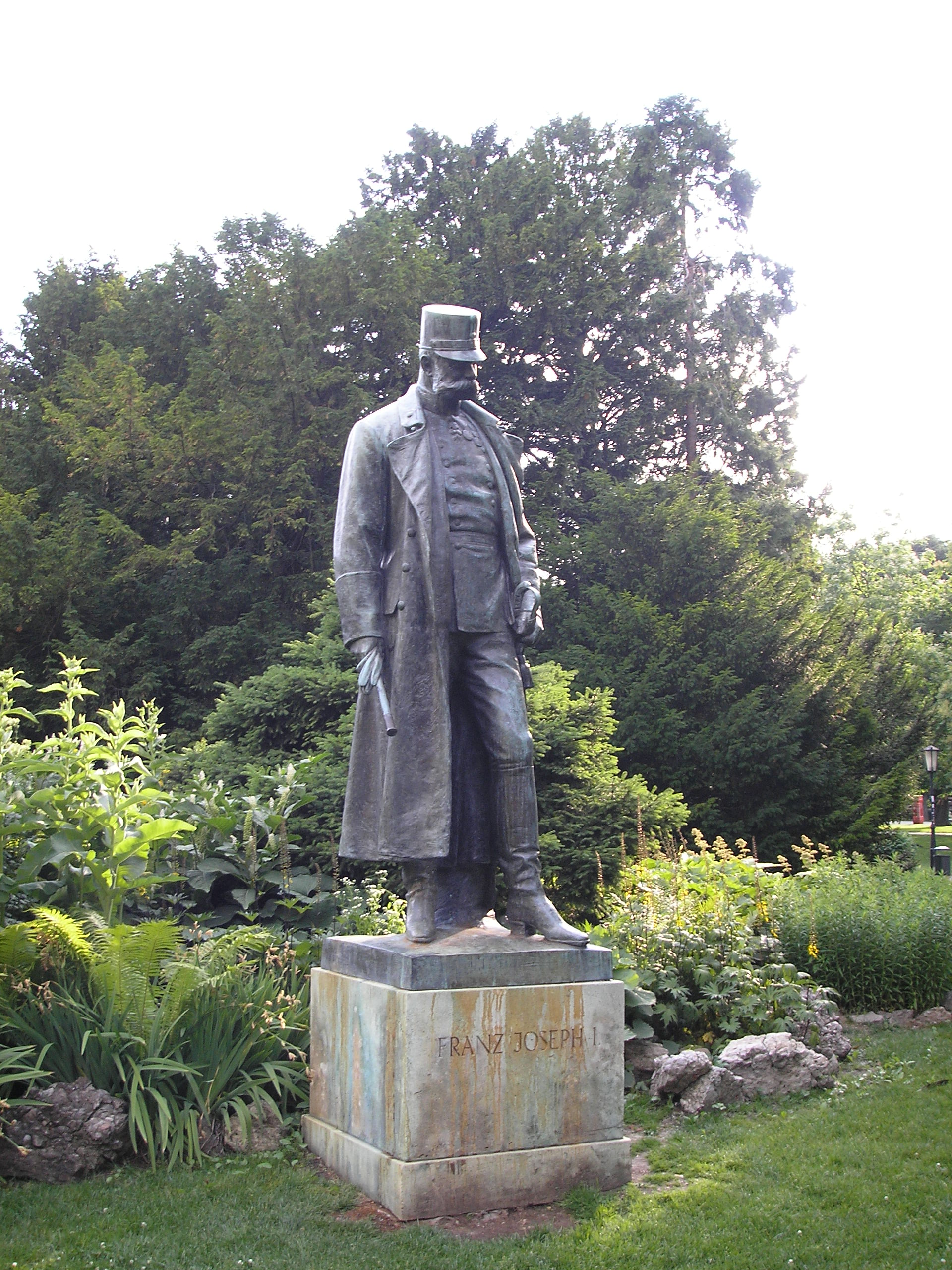
Franz Joseph I

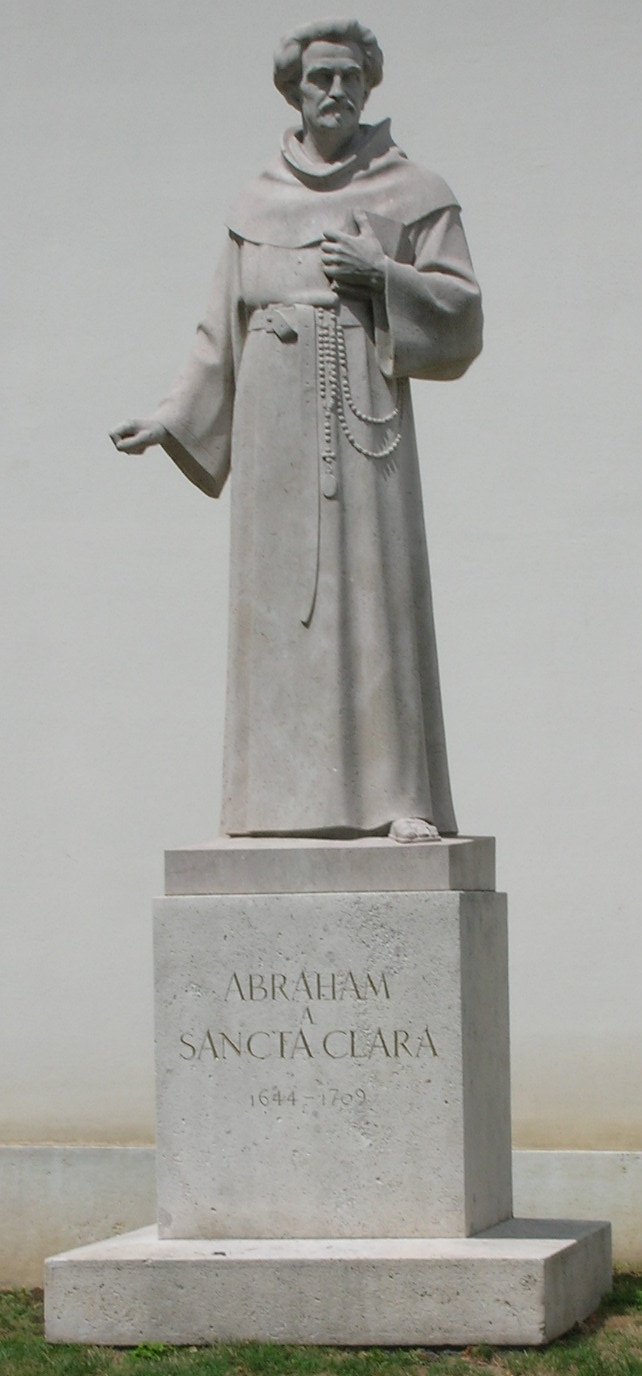
Abraham a Sancta Clara
