= Edmund von Hellmer =

Austrian sculptor (1850–1935)

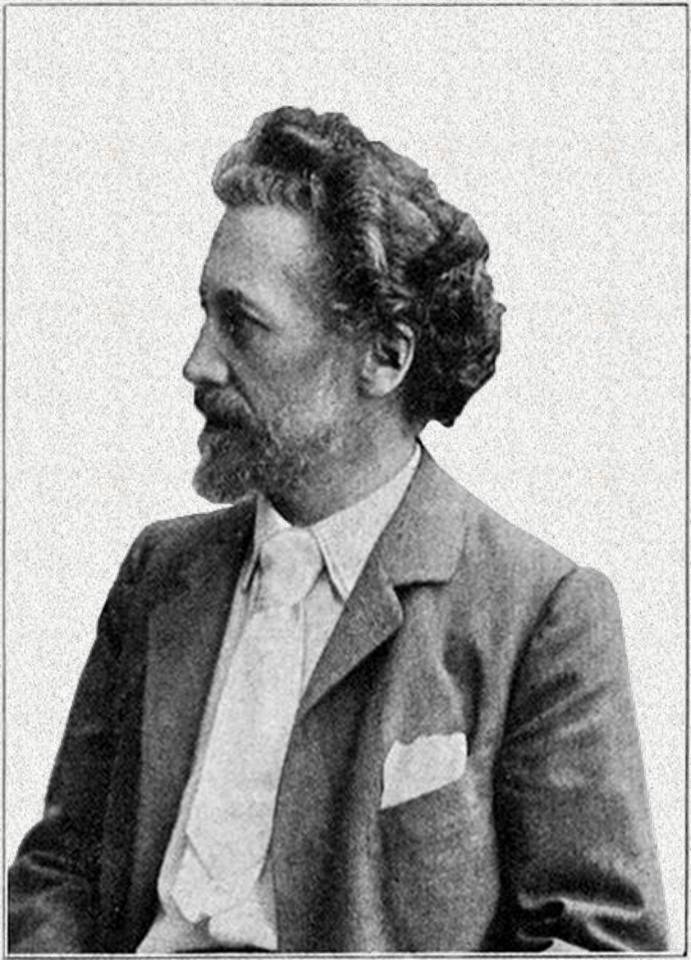
Edmund Hellmer (c.1904)

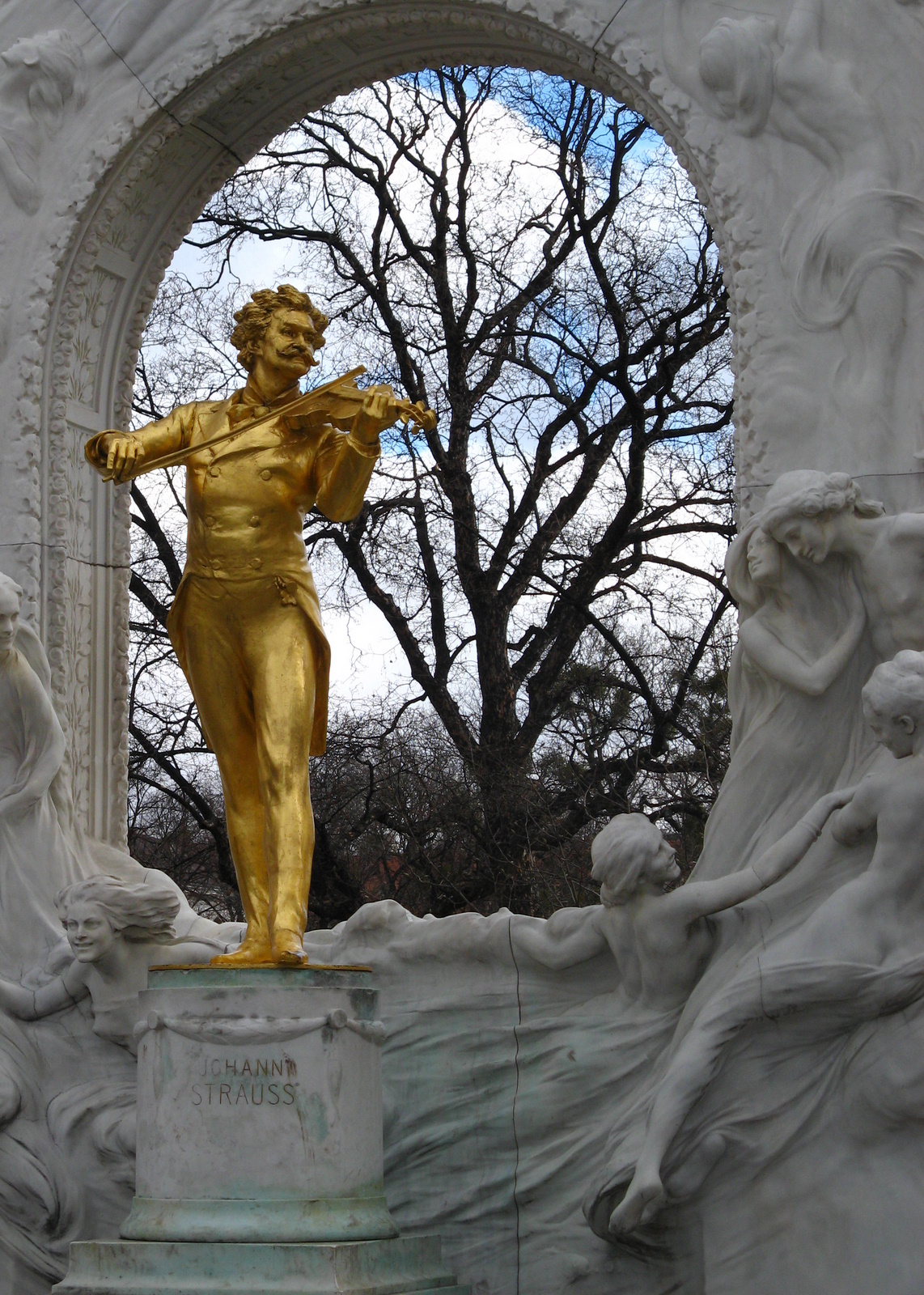
Johann Strauß Monument in Vienna

Edmund Ritter von Hellmer (12 November 1850, Vienna – 9 March 1935, Vienna), born Edmund Hellmer and ennobled in 1912, was an Austrian sculptor who worked in the styles of Historicism and Art Nouveau. He was one of the founders of the Vienna Secession.

== Life ==
Hellmer studied architecture at the Polytechnikum in Vienna. At the same time, he received his first artistic training from his uncle, the sculptor Josef Schönfeld. In 1866, Hellmer decided to study sculpture full-time at the Academy of Fine Arts Vienna. While there, he also worked in the studio of Hanns Gasser, who helped him to finance a short stay in Paris. In 1869, at the age of 19, he presented a statue of Prometheus at the International Art Exhibition in Munich. He won a prize that included a scholarship, enabling him to spend almost two years in Italy.

In 1870, he returned to Vienna and worked as a freelance sculptor. In 1879, he was appointed a Professor at the Academy and, from 1882 to 1892, was a member of the faculty there. Emil Fuchs was one of Hellmer's most prominent students. In 1897, he was one of the founders of the Vienna Secession. From 1901 to 1922 he was an associate dean, then a full dean at the Academy. During the last year of his life, he used a wheelchair.

== Major works ==
- Franz Joseph I Gives His People a Constitution, Pediment at the Austrian Parliament Building, 1879
- Malerei (Allegory of Painting), Sculpture at the facade of the Natural History Museum (Naturhistorisches Museum) at Maria-Theresien-Platz, Vienna, 1880
- Schindler Monument in the Stadtpark, Vienna. Marble, 1895
- Die Macht zu Lande (The Forces on Land or Power on the Land), fountain at the Hofburg in Vienna. Marble, 1897
- Goethe Monument, at the Opera Ring in Vienna. Bronze, 1900.
- Empress Elisabeth Monument, Salzburg, 1901
- Castalia Fountain at the University of Vienna, 1910
- Johann Strauß Monument in the Stadtpark, Vienna. Bronze with marble reliefs, 1921
- Grave statues for Hans Makart (1889), Nikolaus Dumba (1903) and Hugo Wolf (1904), among many others.
