= Gundel-Prize =

Austrian art award

- Awarded for: Outstanding achievement in fine arts by students of the Academy of Fine Arts in Vienna
- Sponsored by: Paul Anton von Gundel
- Country: Austria
- Presented by: Academy of Fine Arts in Vienna
- First award: 1782

The Gundel Prize (German: Gundel-Preis) was awarded annually by the Academy of Fine Arts in Vienna to the students who excelled in the 6 art classes (painting, sculpture, engraving and medal arts, landscape painting, architecture and engraving).

This court prize was donated to the academy in 1782 by the imperial court councillor Paul Anton von Gundel. Until 1783 the prize was paid in cash and from 1784 medals were awarded: For the first prize a gold and for the second a silver medal from his "Most High Imperial Royal Grace".

The academic college of professors formed the jury.

== Selected award winners ==
- 1802 Alois Pichl
- 1805 Moritz Michael Daffinger
- 1810 Ferdinand Georg Waldmüller
- 1816 Karl Schubert
- 1817 Karl Schubert
- 1818 Gábor Melegh
- 1820 Heinrich Schwemminger
- 1823 Franz Xaver Gruber
- 1824 Jakob Sotriffer
- 1825 Franz Eybl
- 1825 Anton Hartinger
- 1827 Josef Erler
- 1828 Leander Russ
- 1830 Albert Theer
- 1833 Eduard Swoboda
- 1835 Anton Schrödl
- 1837 Henrik Weber
- 1837 August Schwendenwein von Lanauberg
- 1839 Emanuel Stöckler
- 1862 Victor Luntz
- 1862 Johannes Benk
- 1866 August Krumholz
- 1868 Viktor Tilgner
- 1869 August Krumholz
- 1879 Uroš Predić
- 1888 Ćiril Iveković
- 1891 Rudolf Wiskoczil
- 1894 Ferdinand Brunner
- 1899 Gustav Jahn
- 1901 Wunibald Deininger
- 1901 Georg Heinrich Kührner
- 1907 Karl Ehn
- 1908 Heinrich Karl Scholz
- 1910 Adolf Wagner von der Mühl
- 1910 Heinrich Schmid
- 1911 Oskar Icha
- 1912 Karl Lehrmann
- 1916 Anton Velim
