= Vyskočil =

Czech surname with notable scientists and actors

Vyskočil (feminine: Vyskočilová) is a Czech surname. Alternative spellings include Wiskocil, Wiskoczil, and Wyskocil.

Notable people with the surname include:

- František Vyskočil (born 1941), Czech neuroscientist
- Ivan Vyskočil (born 1946), Czech actor
- Martin Vyskočil (born 1982), Czech footballer
- Mary Kay Vyskocil (born 1958), United States District Judge
- Pavel Vyskočil (1882–1970), Czech opera singer
- Rudolf Wiskoczil (1870–1925), Austrian architect
