= 6th century BC in poetry =

== Ancient Greece ==
=== Poets (by date of birth) ===
- Anacreon (c. 570–c.485 BCE), Teos
- Xenophanes of Colophon (c. 570–c.478 BCE)
- Phocylides (b. c. 560 BCE)
- Simonides of Ceos (c. 556–469 BCE)
- Hipponax of Ephesus (fl. 540 BCE)
- Aeschylus (525–456 BCE)
- Pindar (c. 522/518 in Cynoscephalae – 443 BCE in Argos)
- Bacchylides (b. c. 507 BCE)

Dates unknown:

- Ibycus, flourished in Rhegium
- Aesop
- Theognis of Megara
- Corinna

=== Works ===
- Ode to Polycrates

== Middle East ==
=== Poets ===
- Jeremiah of Anathoth, writing in Hebrew

=== Works ===
- Psalms
- Book of Jeremiah
- Book of Lamentations

== India ==
=== Poets ===
- Approximate date of Vyasa

=== Works ===
- Approximate date of the Mahabharata
