= Wunibald =

Wunibald is a given name. Notable people with the given name include:

- Wunibald Deininger (1879–1963), Austrian architect and art teacher
- Wunibald Kamm (1893–1966), German automobile designer, engineer, and aerodynamicist

== See also ==
- Winibald
