= Anton Schrödl =

Austrian painter (1820–1906)

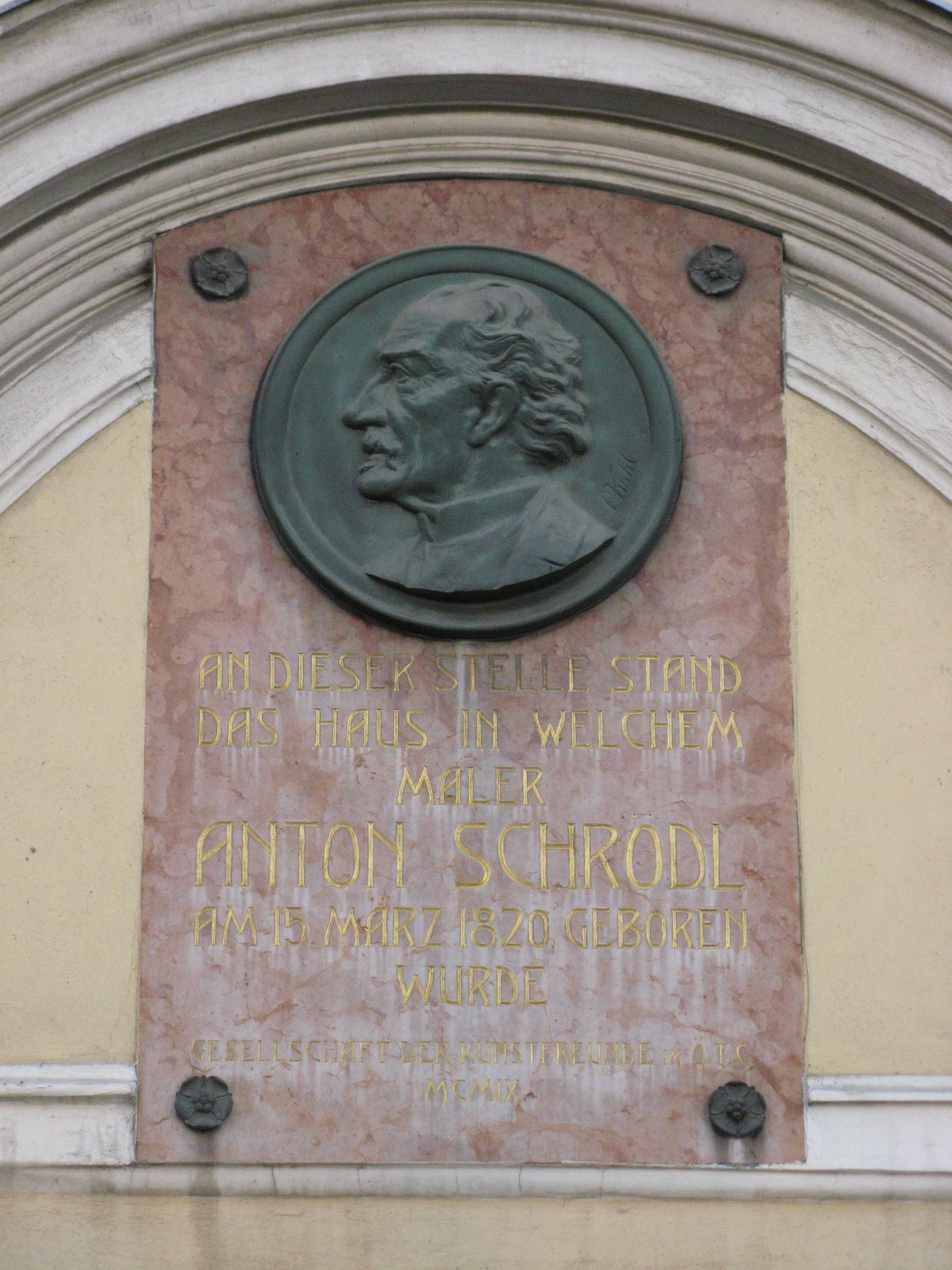
Commemorative plaque at his birthplace

Anton Schrödl (19 February 1820, Schwechat - 5 July 1906, Vienna) was an Austrian painter of animals and genre scenes.

== Biography ==
His ancestry can be traced back to 1428; to the Imperial Toll Collector in Ybbs, Hans Schrötel von Schröttenstein. His father, Joseph Schrödl, was an iron merchant. His older brother, Norbert Michael Schrödl (1816–1890), was an ivory carver and sculptor whose sons, Norbert and Leopold also became artists (a painter and sculptor, respectively).

When he was still very young, his family's financial circumstances worsened and he was placed under the guardianship of a relative in Vienna. At the age of only thirteen, he was able to enroll at the Academy of Fine Arts, where he studied with the flower painter, Sebastian Wegmayr, and was awarded the Gundel-Prize for excellence in 1835. He began his career as a lithographer for the art publishing firm of "Matthäus und Joseph Trentsensky". Animals and landscape paintings were his specialties. He first attracted notice in 1841, at one of the Academy's exhibitions.

Between 1860 and 1870, he worked as a garden designer. His major project was the "Tiergarten am Schüttel", a zoo at the Prater, which closed in 1901.

Although he never served as a Professor at the Academy, he took numerous students; among them, Johann Nepomuk Geller (1860–1954), Alphons Leopold Mielich, Alfred Jirasek (1863–1931) and Gustav Ranzoni. He travelled widely every summer, including a trip to Algeria with Count Johann Nepomuk Wilczek in 1870, which produced some very popular lithographs. But, despite his successes, his financial situation was never secure, so he was forced to auction off his remaining works in 1899.

He was married, but had no children. He died, aged eighty-six, in Vienna's Leopoldstadt district and was interred at the Wiener Zentralfriedhof. His estate was auctioned off in 1907, at the Vienna Künstlerhaus.

== Selected paintings ==
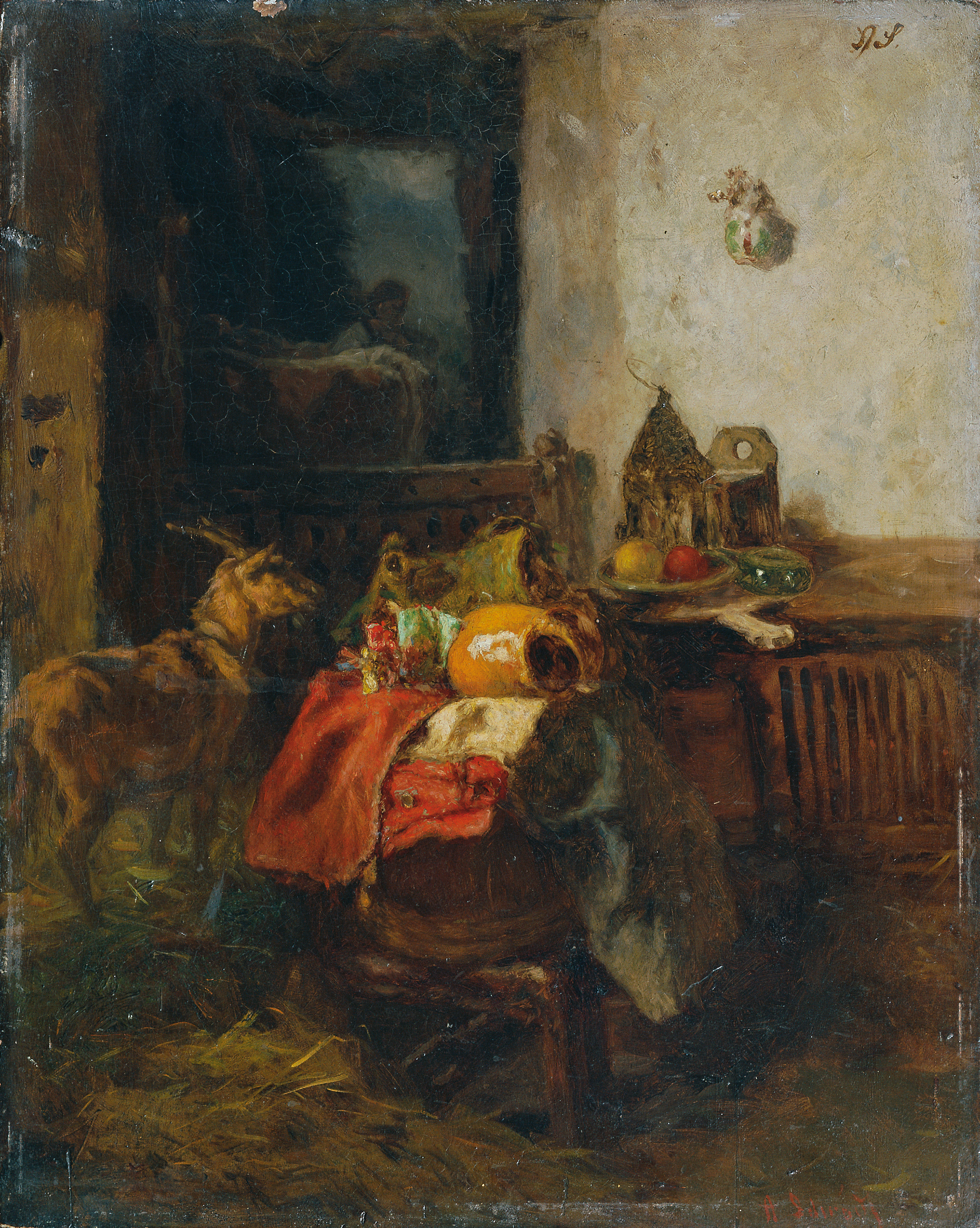
Farmhouse Room with Still-life

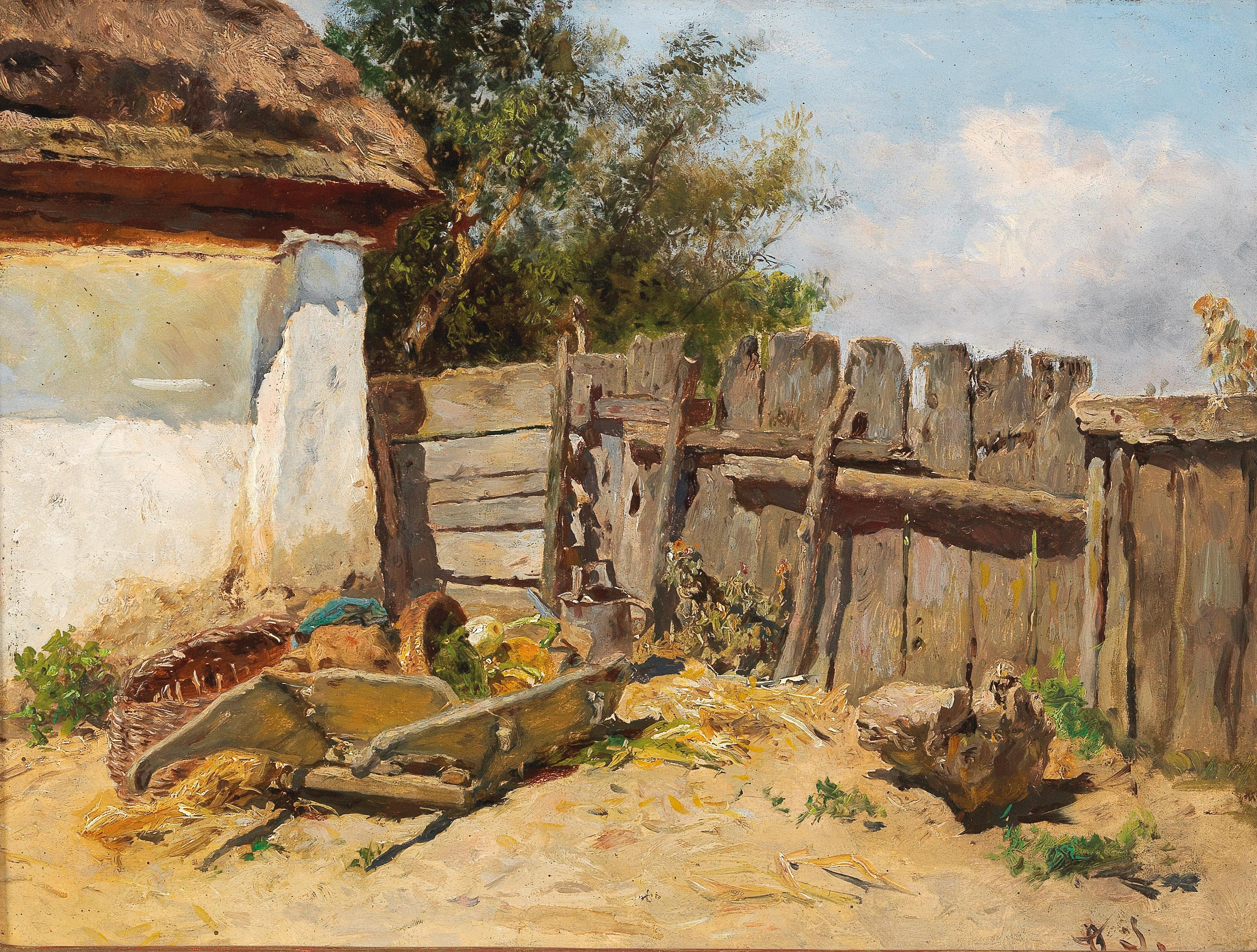
In the Farmhouse Garden

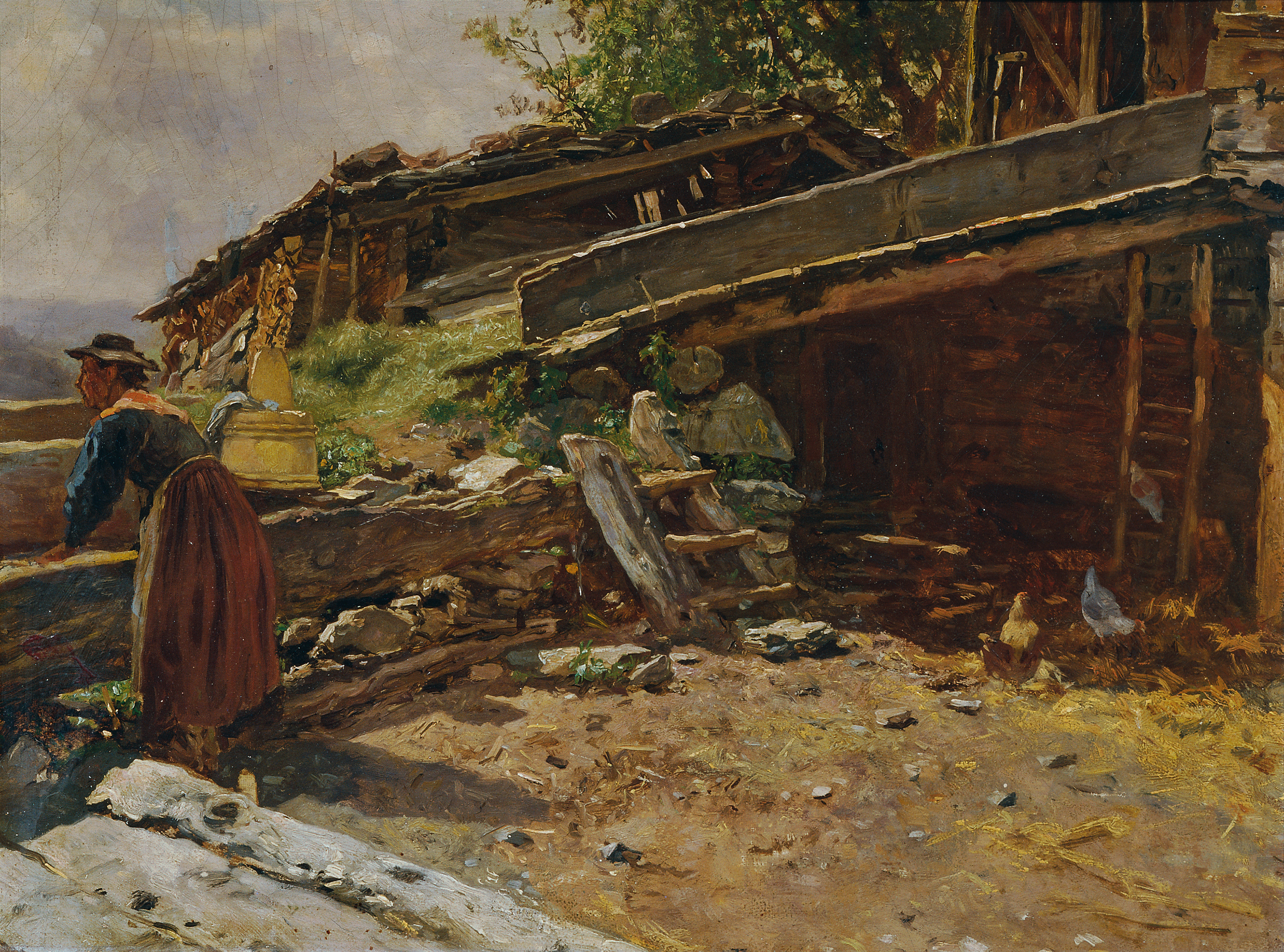
Farmer at the Well in Bruck-Fusch

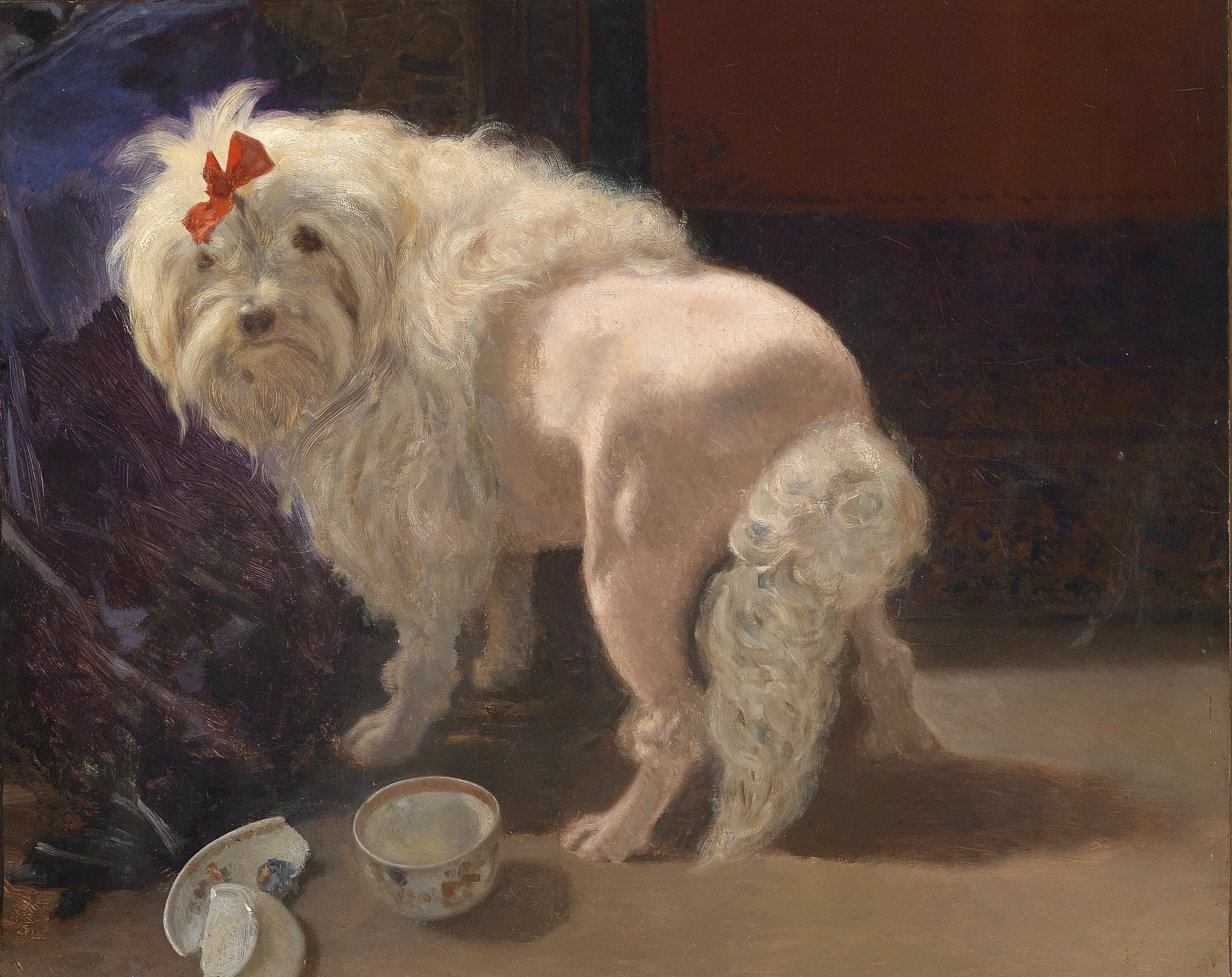
The Broken Bowl

== Sources ==
- Constantin von Wurzbach: "Schrödl, Anton." In: Biographisches Lexikon des Kaiserthums Oesterreich (Biographical Lexicon of the Empire of Austria). Part 31 Kaiserlich-königliche Hof- und Staatsdruckerei, Vienna 1876, p. 344 f. (digitalised).
- A. Gehart: "Anton Schrödl". In: Österreichisches Biographisches Lexikon 1815–1950 (ÖBL). Vol. 11, Austrian Academy of Sciences, Vienna 1999, ISBN 3-7001-2803-7, p. 235 f. (Direct links to "p. 235", "p. 236")
