= Josef Schwemminger =

Austrian landscape painter (1804-1895)

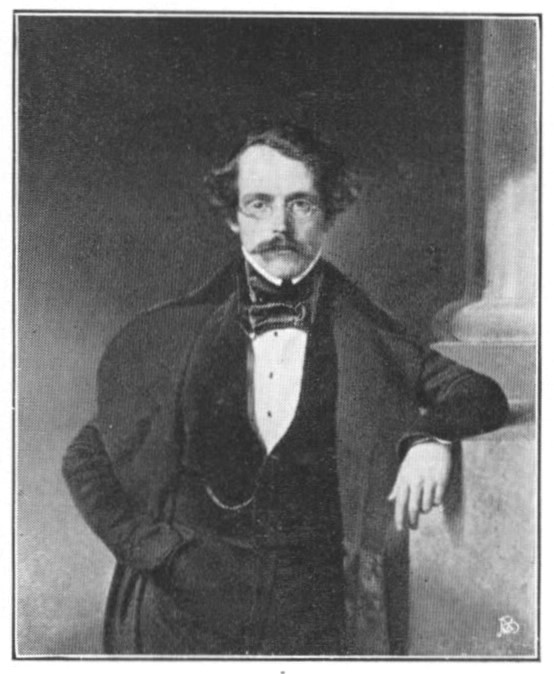
Josef Schwemminger; reproduction of a painting by Franz Eybl

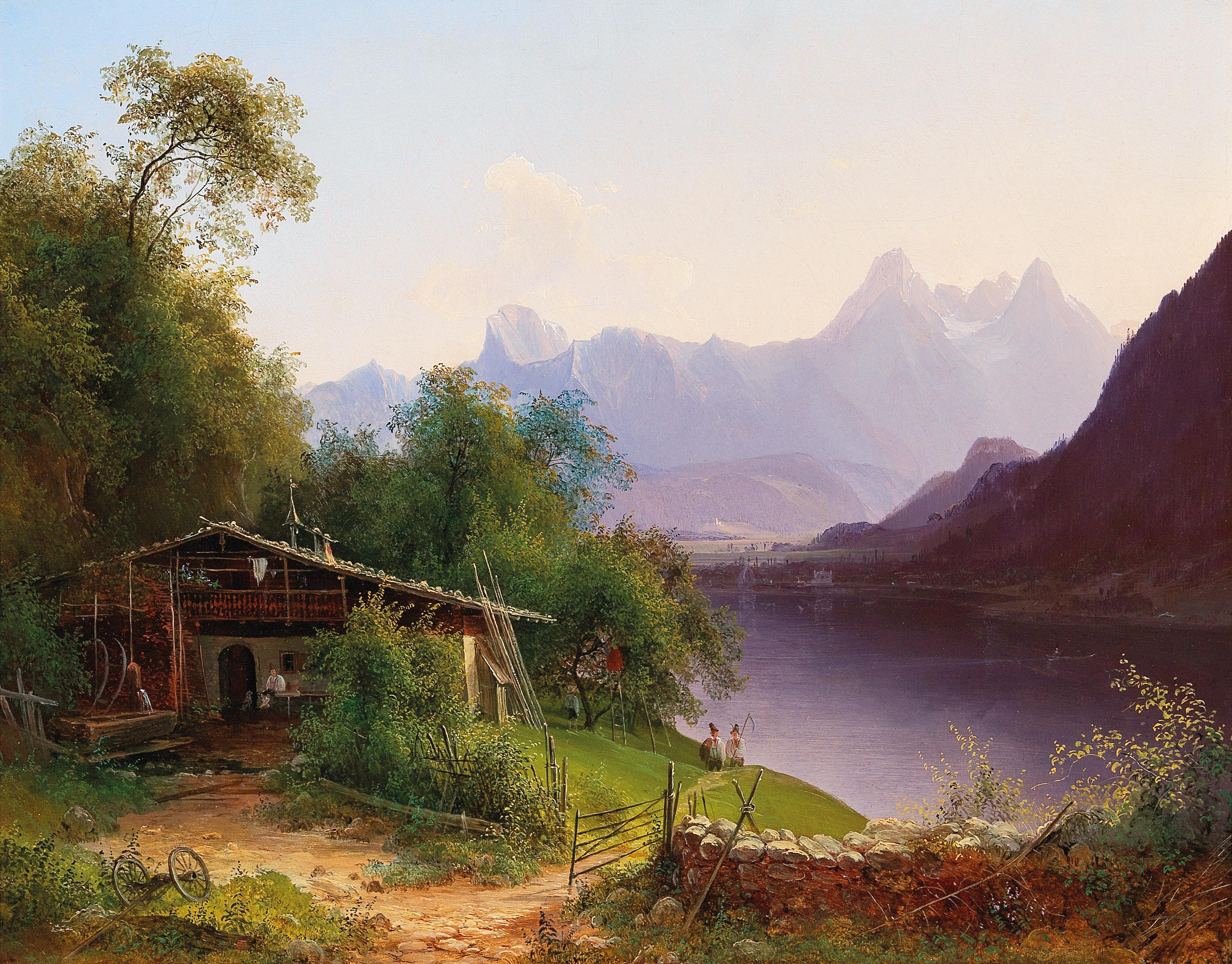
View over Lake Zell

Josef Schwemminger (21 June 1804 – 12 January 1895) was an Austrian landscape painter.

== Life and work ==
He was born on 21 June 1804 in Vienna. His father, Anton Schwemminger (1764–1808), was a porcelain painter. His older brother, Heinrich, also became a painter. His sister, Theresia, married the painter Karl Schubert; a brother of the composer Franz Schubert.

From 1817 to 1827, he studied at the Academy of Fine Arts, Vienna; specializing in landscapes, with motifs relating to the nationalistic concept of "Heimat". He travelled throughout Austria, Bavaria and Northern Italy. Many of his works were reproduced and distributed as steel engravings. In 1848, he became a member of the Academy and, in 1868, joined the Vienna Künstlerhaus.

He died on 12 January 1895, at the age of ninety, in Vienna's Alsergrund district.
