= Ibycus =

6th-century BC Greek lyric poet

Ibycus (/ˈɪbɪkəs/; Ancient Greek: Ἴβυκος; fl. 2nd half of 6th century BC) was an Ancient Greek lyric poet, a citizen of Rhegium in Magna Graecia, probably active at Samos during the reign of the tyrant Polycrates and numbered by the scholars of Hellenistic Alexandria in the canonical list of nine lyric poets. He was mainly remembered in antiquity for pederastic verses, but he also composed lyrical narratives on mythological themes in the manner of Stesichorus. His work survives today only as quotations by ancient scholars or recorded on fragments of papyrus recovered from archaeological sites in Egypt, yet his extant verses include what are considered some of the finest examples of Greek poetry.

As is the case with many other major poets of ancient Greece, Ibycus became famous not just for his poetry but also for events in his life, largely the stuff of legend: the testimonia are difficult to interpret and very few biographical facts are actually known.

== Life ==
The Byzantine encyclopaedia Suda represents a good example of a problematic biography, here translated by David Campbell:

Ibycus: son of Phytius; but some say son of the historian Polyzelus of Messana, others son of Cerdas; of Rhegium by birth. From there he went to Samos when it was ruled by the father of the tyrant Polycrates. This was in the time of Croesus, in the 54th Olympiad (564–60 BC). He was completely crazed with love for boys, and he was the inventor of the so-called sambyke, a kind of triangular cithara. His works are in seven books in the Doric dialect. Captured by bandits in a deserted place he declared that the cranes which happened to be flying overhead would be his avengers; he was murdered, but afterwards one of the bandits saw some cranes in the city and exclaimed, "Look, the avengers of Ibycus!" Someone overheard and followed up his words: the crime was confessed and the bandits paid the penalty; whence the proverbial expression, "the cranes of Ibycus".

Suda's chronology has been dismissed as "muddled" since it makes Ibycus about a generation older than Anacreon, another poet known to have flourished at the court of Polycrates, and it is inconsistent with what we know of the Samian tyrant from Herodotus. Eusebius recorded the poet's first experience of fame ("agnoscitur") somewhere between 542 and 537 BC and this better fits the period of Polycrates' reign. Suda's account seems to be corroborated by a papyrus fragment (P.Oxy.1790), usually ascribed to Ibycus, glorifying a youthful Polycrates, but this was unlikely to have been the Polycrates of Samos and might instead have been his son, mentioned in a different context by Himerius as Polycrates, governor of Rhodes. Suda's list of fathers of Ibycus also presents problems: there were no historians in the early 6th century and Cerdas looks like an invention of the comic stage (it has low associations).

There was a Pythagorean lawgiver of Rhegium known as Phytius, but the early 6th century is too early for this candidate also. Ibycus gives no indication of being a Pythagorean himself, except in one poem he identifies the Morning Star with the Evening Star, an identity first popularized by Pythagoras.

Ibycus provided the first attestation of an historical Thracian or Thraco-Dacian bard Orpheus, purported composer of the Orphic Hymns; ("The earliest literary reference to Orpheus is a two-word fragment of the 6th century BC lyric poet Ibycus of Samos: onomaklyton Orphēn ('Orpheus famous-of-name')."), whose name might indicate an origin in slavery {Orpheus#Etymology}. Not incidentally, enslavement of Thraco-Dacians in Samos, in particular, is also (dimly) attested by the history of another such personnage who rose to prominence among the pre-Hellenistic Greeks: namely, X/Zalmoxis, reputedly a Thraco-Dacian slave in the household of reputed-one-time Hierophant of Eleusis, Pythagoras (also of Samos). X/Zalmoxis apparently achieved some form of apprenticeship with that most famous practitioner of Pythagoreanism, and evidently goes on to earn his freedom as well as a reputation as a great healer of 'body and soul (psyche),' via Plato (see Zalmoxis#"Religion of the Getae") ...Plato attributes an holistic approach to healing body and soul (psyche)... in the latter case, not unlike Orpheus..who ended up with a cave-based oracle in nearby Lesbos island, in the region of Ionia's northern neighbors, the Aeolians. Notably, Using music to relieve lustful urges was a Pythagorean remedy stemming from an anecdote from the life of Pythagoras claiming that, when he encountered some drunken youths trying to break into the home of a virtuous woman, he sang a solemn tune with long spondees and the boys' "raging willfulness" was quelled.

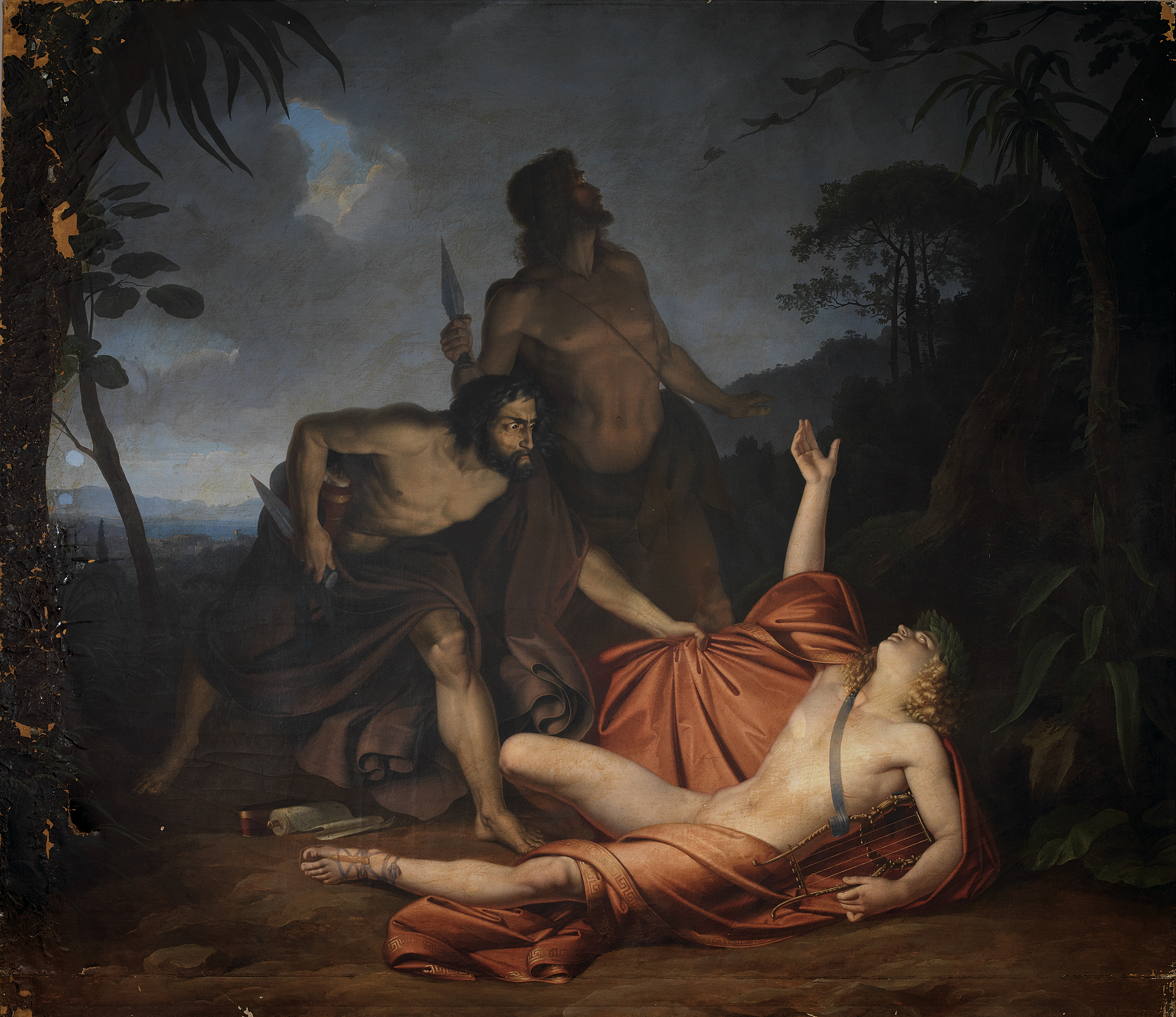
The Cranes of Ibycus, by Heinrich Schwemminger, illustrating Schiller's poem of that name

Suda's extraordinary account of the poet's death is found in other sources, such as Plutarch and Antipater of Sidon and later it inspired Friedrich Schiller to write a ballad called "The Cranes of Ibycus" yet the legend might be derived merely from a play upon the poet's name and the Greek word for the bird ἶβυξ or ibyx—it might even have been told of somebody else originally. (Note: However, according to Hesychius (s.v. iota 138) ἶβυξ is a form of ibis, while the common Greek word for "crane" (γέρανος, geranos) is used of the birds associated with the death of Ibycus) Another proverb associated with Ibycus was recorded by Diogenianus: "more antiquated than Ibycus" or "more silly than Ibycus". The proverb was apparently based on an anecdote about Ibycus stupidly or nobly turning down an opportunity to become tyrant of Rhegium in order to pursue a poetic career instead (one modern scholar however infers from his poetry that Ibycus was in fact wise enough to avoid the lure of supreme power, citing as an example Plato's quotation from one of his lyrics: "I am afraid it may be in exchange for some sin before the gods that I get honour from men"). There is no other information about Ibycus' activities in the West, apart from an account by Himerius, that he fell from his chariot while travelling between Catana and Himera and injured his hand badly enough to give up playing the lyre "for some considerable time."

Some modern scholars have found in the surviving poetry evidence that Ibycus might have spent time at Sicyon before journeying to Samos—mythological references indicate local knowledge of Sicyon and could even point to the town's alliance with Sparta against Argos and Athens. His depiction of the women of Sparta as "thigh-showing" (quoted by Plutarch as proof of lax morals among the women there) is vivid enough to suggest that he might have composed some verses in Sparta also. It is possible that he left Samos at the same time as Anacreon, on the death of Polycrates, and there is an anonymous poem in the Palatine Anthology celebrating Rhegium as his final resting place, describing a tomb located under an elm, covered in ivy and white reeds.

== Poetry ==
Ibycus' role in the development of Greek lyric poetry was as a mediator between eastern and western styles:

Sappho and Alcaeus wrote while Stesichorus was developing the different art of the choral ode in the West. They owed nothing to him, and he owed nothing to them. But soon afterwards the art of the West was brought to Ionia, and the fusion of the two styles marked a new stage in Greek poetry. For Stesichorus left a disciple, who began by writing in the master's manner and then turned to other purposes and made his poetry the vehicle for his own private, or public, emotions. — Cecil Maurice Bowra

Although scholars like Bowra have concluded that his style must have changed with his setting, such a neat distinction is actually hard to prove from the existing verses, which are an intricate blend of the public, "choral" style of Stesichorus, and the private, "soloist" style of the Lesbian poets. It is not certain that he ever in fact composed monody (lyrics for solo performance), but the emotional and erotic quality of his verse, and the fact that his colleague in Samos was Anacreon, who did compose monody, suggest that Ibycus did too. On the other hand, some modern scholars believe that 'choral' lyrics were actually performed by soloists and therefore maybe all Ibycus' work was monody. He modelled his work on the "choral" lyrics of Stesichorus at least in so far as he wrote narratives on mythical themes (often with original variations from the traditional stories) and structured his verses in triads (units of three stanzas each, called "strophe", "antistrophe" and "epode"), so closely in fact that even the ancients sometimes had difficulty distinguishing between the two poets (Note: Cambell elsewhere (Greek Lyric III, Loeb, page 63) cites this comment by Athenaeus (4.172de): "but Stesichorus or Ibycus had previously said in a poem entitled Funeral Games ...") Whereas however ancient scholars collected the work of Stesichorus into twenty-six books, each probably a self-contained narrative that gave its title to the whole book, they compiled only seven books for Ibycus, which were numbered rather than titled and whose selection criteria are unknown. Recent papyrus finds suggest also that Ibycus might have been the first to compose 'choral' victory odes (an innovation usually credited to Simonides). (Note: Cambell cites P.Oxy.2637 and finds also a pindaric/epinikion tone in a quote from Porphyry (comment. in Ptolem. harmon. iv):"with the gluttonous mouth of Strife will one day arm for battle against me."; translated by Cambell, Loeb III, page 271)

Until the 1920s, all that survived of Ibycus' work were two large-ish fragments (one seven, the other thirteen lines long) and about fifty other lines scraped together from a variety of ancient commentaries. Since then, papyrus finds have greatly added to the store of Ibycean verses – notably, and controversially, forty-eight continuous lines addressed to Polycrates, whose identification with Polycrates of Rhodes (son of Polycrates, the Samian tyrant) requires a careful selection of historical sources. Authorship of the poem is attributed to Ibycus on textual and historical grounds but its quality as verse is open to debate: "insipid", "inept and slovenly" or, more gently, "not an unqualified success" and optimally "the work of a poet realizing a new vision, with a great command of epic material which he could manipulate for encomiastic effect." In the poem, Ibycos parades the names and characteristics of heroes familiar from Homer's Trojan epic, as types of people the poem is not about, until he reaches the final stanza, where he reveals that his real subject is Polycrates, whom he says he will immortalize in verse. This "puzzling" poem has been considered historically significant by some scholars as a signal from Ibycus that he is now turning his back on epic themes to concentrate on love poetry instead: a new vision or recusatio.

He composed like Stesichorus in a literary language, largely Epic with some Doric flavouring, and with a few Aeolisms that he borrowed from the love poetry of Sappho and Alcaeus. It is possible however that the Doric dialect was added by editors in Hellenistic and Roman times, when the poet's home town, Rhegium, had become more Doric than it had been in the poet's own time. In addition to this "superficial element of Doric dialect", the style of Ibycus features mainly dactylic rhythms (reflecting the Epic traditions he shared with Stesichorus), a love theme and accumulated epithets. His use of imagery can seem chaotic but it is justified as an artistic effect. His style has been described by one modern scholar as "graceful and passionate." The ancients sometimes considered his work with distaste as a lecherous and corrupting influence (Note: D.A.Campbell, Greek Lyric III, Loeb (1991) page 8: "His love poetry was what later generations particularly remembered, sometimes with distaste", citing as proof Philodemus and Cicero, translated on page 217: 1. Philodemus On Music, here commenting on the arguments of the Stoic Diogenes: "And he did not show that Ibycus, Anacreon and the like corrupted young men by their melodies but rather by their ideas."; 2. CiceroTusc. 4.33: "Finally, what revelations do the greatest scholars and finest poets make about themselves in their poems and songs? Alcaeus was recognised as a valiant hero in his city, but look at what he writes about love for youths! Anacreon's poetry of course is all erotic. More than any of them Ibycus of Rhegium was ablaze with love, as his writings demonstrate. And we see that the love of all these is lustful.") but they also responded sympathetically to the pathos he sought to evoke—his account of Menelaus's failure to kill Helen of Troy, under the spell of her beauty, was valued by ancient critics above Euripides's account of the same story in his play Andromache.

=== Example ===
The following lines, dedicated to a lover, Euryalus, were recorded by Athenaeus as a famous example of amorous praise:

Εὐρύαλε Γλαυκέων Χαρίτων θάλος, <Ὡρᾶν>
καλλικόμων μελέδημα, σὲ μὲν Κύπρις
ἅ τ' ἀγανοβλέφαρος Πει-
θὼ ῥοδέοισιν ἐν θρέψαν.

The rich language of these lines, in particular the accumulation of epithets, typical of Ibycus, is shown in the following translation:

Euryalus, offshoot of the blue-eyed Graces, darling of the lovely-haired Seasons, the Cyprian and soft-lidded Persuasion nursed you among rose-blossoms.

This mythological account of his lover recalls Hesiod's account of Pandora, who was decked out by the same goddesses (the Graces, the Seasons and Persuasion) so as to be a bane to mankind—an allusion consistent with Ibycus's view of love as unavoidable turmoil.

=== Fragment 286 ===
The following poem was quoted by the ancient scholar Athenaeus in his wide-ranging discourses Scholars at Dinner and it demonstrates some of the characteristics of Ibycean verse:

In spring the Kydonian
apple trees, watered by flowing
streams there where the Maidens
have their unravished garden, and vine buds,
growing under the shadowy branches
of the vines, bloom and flourish. For me, however, love
is at rest in no season
but like the Thracian north wind,
ablaze with lightning,
rushing from Aphrodite with scorching
fits of madness, dark and unrestrained,
it forcibly convulses from their very roots
my mind and heart.

The poem establishes a contrast between the tranquility of nature and the ever restless impulses to which the poet's desires subject him, while the images and epithets accumulate almost chaotically, communicating a sense of his inner turmoil. In the original Greek, initial tranquility is communicated by repeated vowel sounds in the first six lines. His love of nature and his ability to describe it in lively images are reminiscent of Sappho's work.

== Reception ==
- In book four of Apollonius Rhodius's Argonautica, the goddess Hera reveals that Achilles is destined to marry Medea in the Elysian Fields (Argonautica 4.811–15). A scholiast on the passage comments that this account was first put forward by Ibycus, and that it was also taken up by Simonides of Ceos. In another scholium, it is said that the Argonautica's account of Ganymede's abduction by an amorous Zeus (Argonautica 3.114–17) was also modelled on a version by Ibycus (in Homer's earlier account, Zeus abducted the youth to be his wine-pourer: Iliad 20.234), and that Ibycus, moreover, described the abduction of Tithonus by Dawn (Eos). Apollonius Rhodius represented Eros as a child of Aphrodite (Argonautica 3.25–6) and there is a relevant scholium on that passage too, according to which Sappho made Eros the son of Earth and Heaven, Simonides made him the son of Aphrodite and Ares, and Ibycus made him the son of ...? The section is lost, but it has been suggested that he made Eros the son of Aphrodite and Hephaestus
- Parmenides seems to have admired Ibycus's work because he cites him in Plato's dialogue of the same name.
- Friedrich Schiller based his 1797 ballad Die Kraniche des Ibykus (The Cranes Of Ibycus) on the rendition of the poet's murder.

== See also ==
- Ode to Polycrates

== Sources ==
- Deakin, Michael A. B. (2007), Hypatia of Alexandria: Mathematician and Martyr, Amherst, NY: Prometheus Books, ISBN 978-1-59102-520-7
- Watts, Edward J. (2017), Hypatia: The Life and Legend of an Ancient Philosopher, Oxford, England: Oxford University Press, ISBN 978-0190659141
