= Josef Erler =

Austrian painter (1804–1844)

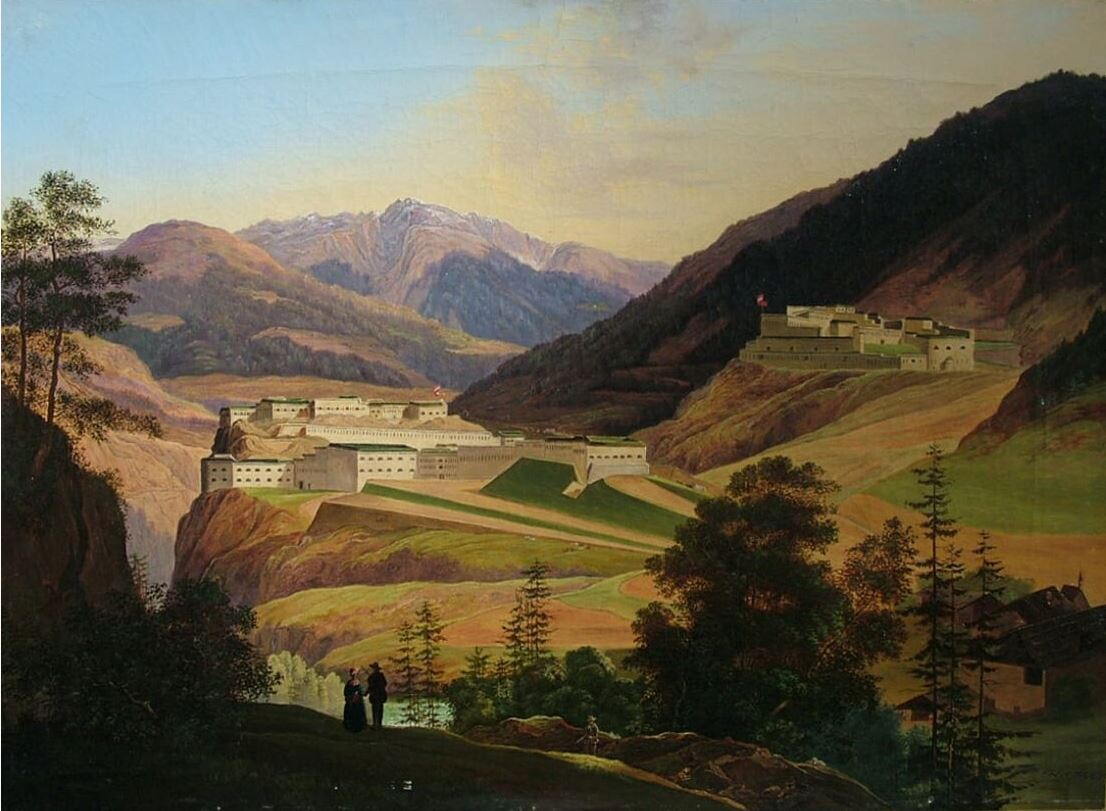
The Franzensfeste Fortress

Josef Erler (9 February 1804 – 31 March 1844) was an Austrian landscape painter.

== Life and work ==
Erler was born on 9 February 1804 in Brixen. He received his first drawing lessons in Brixen from a local artist named Josef Tauber. With the help of some friends, he was able to enroll at the Academy of Fine Arts, Vienna, in 1825. He would study there intermittently for eleven years. During this time, he was awarded the Gundel-Prize for excellence (1827), and the Lampi-Prize for drawing from nature.

He returned to Brixen in 1836 and died while visiting Innsbruck, at the age of only forty.

He created history paintings, portraits and, above all, landscapes. His works have been largely forgotten, and are of interest mainly for their historical value. They include several views of Bolzano, which may be seen at the Museo Civico di Bolzano, and altarpieces at the parish church in Sautens. His painting of the newly constructed Franzensfeste Fortress was acquired by Emperor Ferdinand I. Some of his works were presented as gifts to Vincenzo Tizzani, the Bishop of Terni.

He died on 31 March 1844 in Innsbruck.

== Sources ==
- Constantin von Wurzbach: "Erler, Joseph". In: Biographisches Lexikon des Kaiserthums Oesterreich. Vol.4 Verlag L. C. Zamarski, 1858, p. 72 (Online)
