= Karl Schubert =

Austrian painter (1795–1855)

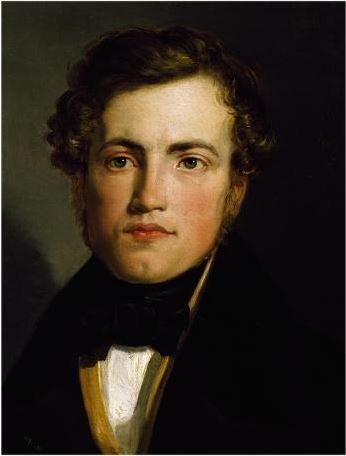
- Born: 5 November 1795
- Died: 20 March 1855 (aged 59)
- Style: landscape painting

Franz Karl Schubert (5 November 1795, Vienna – 20 March 1855, Vienna) was an Austrian landscape painter. One of his brothers was the famous composer, Franz Schubert.

== Life and work ==
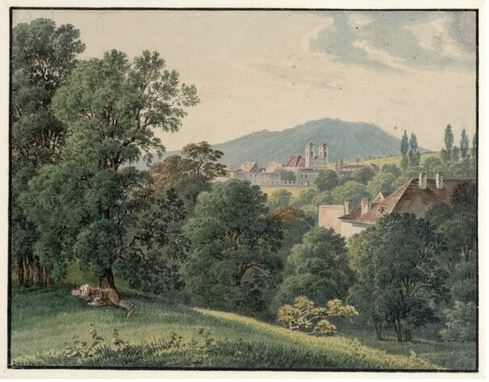
View of Hafnerberg

From 1811 to 1822, he studied landscape painting at the Academy of Fine Arts, Vienna. While there, he was awarded the Gundel-Prize for excellence twice; in 1816 and 1817. He was not only active as a painter, but also worked as a writing and drawing teacher for many notable figures in upper-class Viennese society.

He married the milliner, Theresia Schwemminger, a sister of the painters Heinrich and Josef Schwemminger. Their two sons, Ferdinand (1824-1853) and Heinrich Carl, also became painters.

He died at the age of fifty-nine in Vienna's Alsergrund district. His works may be seen at several Vienna Museum sites, as well as in the Kupferstichkabinett (print room) at the Academy and the Kunsthaus Zürich.
