= Jakob Sotriffer =

Austrian sculptor

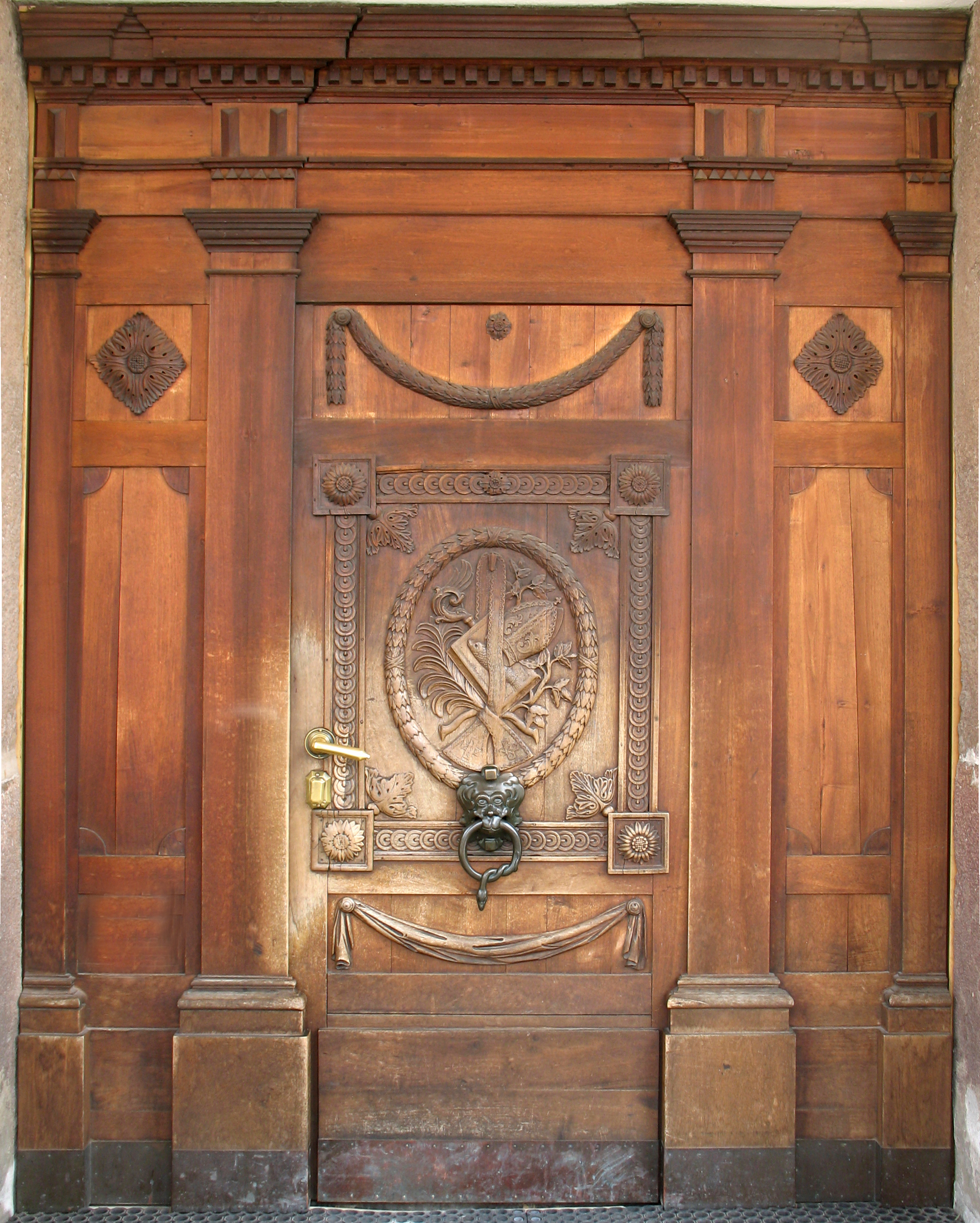
Main portal at the Parish Church of St. Ulrich (Urtijëi)

Johann Jakob Sotriffer (30 January 1796, St. Ulrich in Gröden - 28 April 1856, St. Ulrich in Gröden) was an Austrian sculptor and drawing teacher in South Tyrol.

== Biography ==
In 1821, Emperor Francis II approved the establishment of a drawing school in St. Ulrich. Sotriffer, who had learned various types of carving from his father, was selected from four applicants and sent to Vienna for training. In thanks, he presented the Emperor with two alabaster religious figures he had made, and was given 300 florins.

He attended classes at the Academy of Fine Arts as well as receiving practical instruction in the workshops of sculptors, turners, gilders and varnishers. In 1824, he was awarded the Academy's Gundel-Prize for excellence. Later that year, he finished his training and the drawing school was opened with great fanfare in January, 1825.

Although he was trained as a sculptor, he was not allowed to teach modelling in wax until 1832. His Pietà, carved in alabaster, may be seen at the Museum Gherdëina. He also carved the doors on the main portal at the Parish Church of St. Ulrich and angels for the church in Brixen.

In addition to his work at the school, he served as the Armenfondverwalter (Poor Fund Administrator) for the municipality.

Upon retiring, he was succeeded by his son, Christian (1835–1908), then Johann Burgauner and, finally, Vinzenz Runggaldier-Janon (1839–1892). The school closed in 1890.

== Sources ==
- Constantin von Wurzbach: "Sotriffer, Johann Jacob." In: Biographisches Lexikon des Kaiserthums Oesterreich (Biographical Lexicon of the Empire of Austria). Part 36 Kaiserlich-königliche Hof- und Staatsdruckerei, Vienna 1878, p. 36 f. (digitalised).
- Christine Gruber – Ellen Hastaba: "Sotriffer, Johann Jakob". In: Österreichisches Biographisches Lexikon 1815–1950 (ÖBL). Vol. 12, Austrian Academy of Sciences, Vienna 2005, ISBN 3-7001-3580-7, p. 433 f. (Direct links to "p. 433", "p. 434")
