= Wunibald Deininger =

Austrian architect (1879–1963)

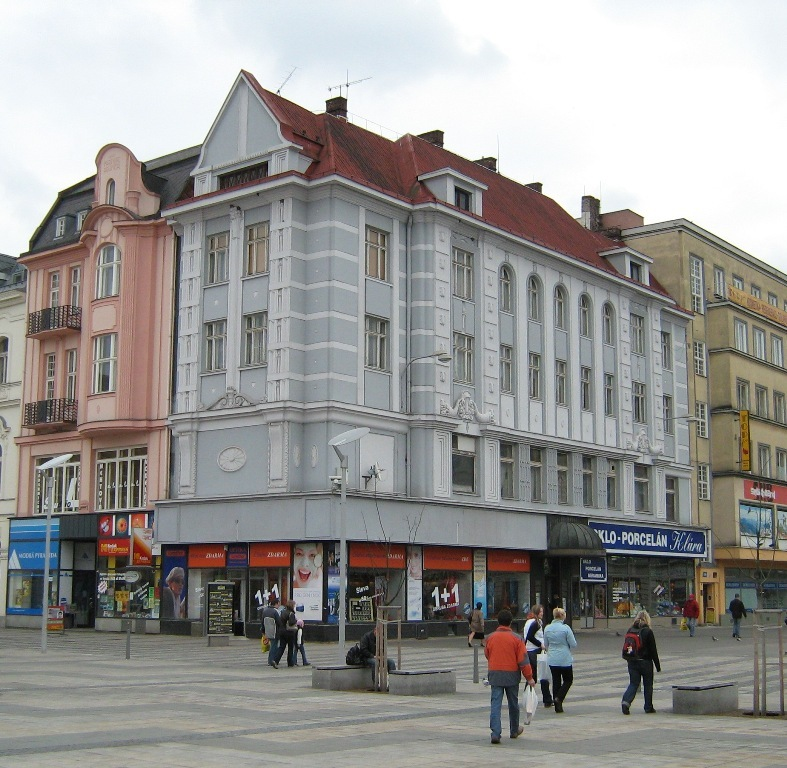
The Reisz Building, Ostrava

Wunibald Deininger (5 March 1879, Vienna – 28 August 1963, Salzburg) was an Austrian architect and art teacher.

== Life and work ==
His father Julius, uncle Johann and brother Theodor (1881–1908) were all architects. His mother Ludmilla, née Schönfuss, was originally from Moravia.

He began his studies at the Gewerbeschule (Industrial school). In 1898, he transferred to the Academy of Fine Arts, where he began with Victor Luntz, then studied with Otto Wagner for three years. In 1901, he was awarded the academy's Gundel-Prize for excellence. Upon graduating, he was presented with a scholarship that enabled him to study in Rome.

Before establishing an independent practice in 1910, he worked with his father. His first fully independent project was a home for J. E. Steiner, a manufacturer of furniture fabrics. After that, he specialized in family houses, inspired by his time in Italy, with elements from English architecture. He designed buildings in Ostrava as well as Vienna. During World War I, he lived in Italy.

After the war, he obtained a position at an industrial school in Salzburg. From 1931 to 1946, he served as a professor at the Graz University of Technology where, on two occasions, he briefly held the position of Dean of the School of Architecture. Back in Salzburg, he designed both residential and commercial buildings, as well as becoming involved in urban planning. Many of his original sketches and plans are held by the Salzburg Museum.
