= Alois Delug =

Austrian painter (1859–1930)

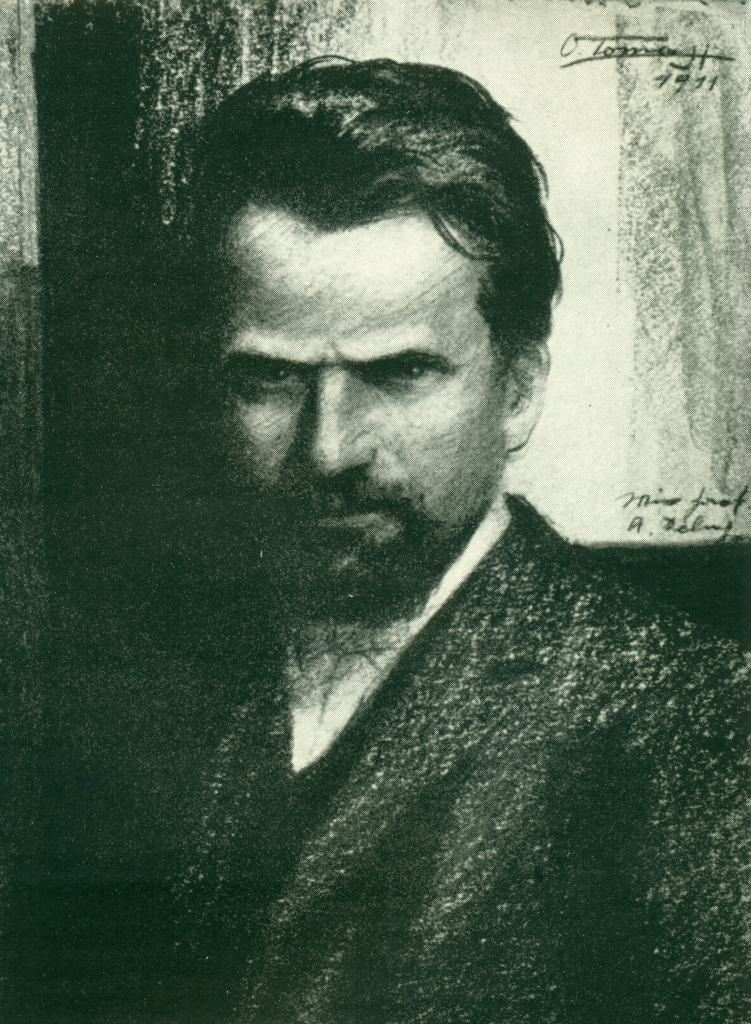
- Delug, by O Tomasi (1911)
- Born: 25 May 1859; Bozen, Austrian Empire
- Died: 17 September 1930 (aged 71); Vienna, Austria
- Occupation: Painter

Alois Delug (25 May 1859 – 17 September 1930) was an Austrian painter and a professor at the Academy of Fine Arts, Vienna. He may be remembered best for his supposed role in rejecting Adolf Hitler's application to join the academy.

== Life ==
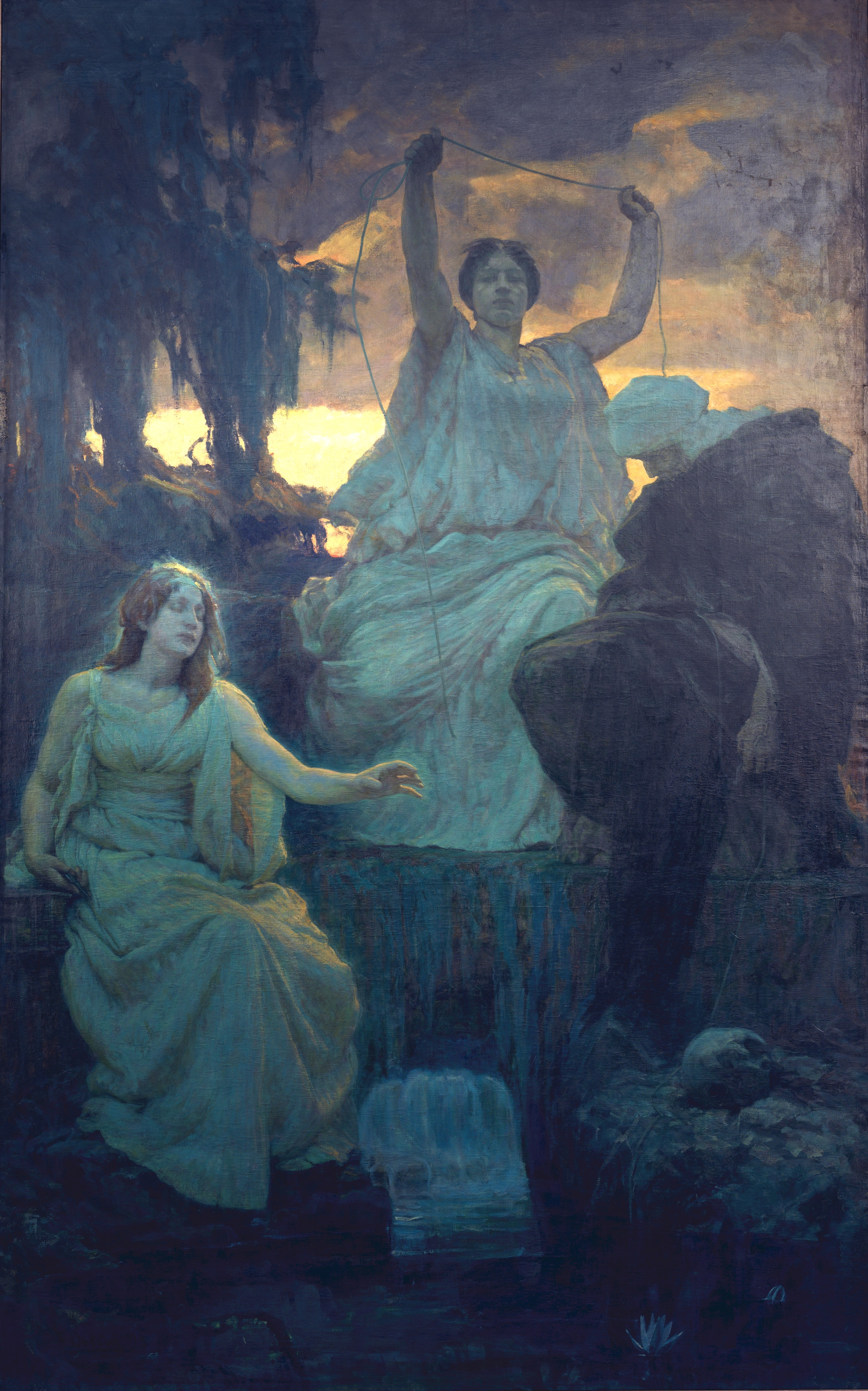
The Norns (1894)

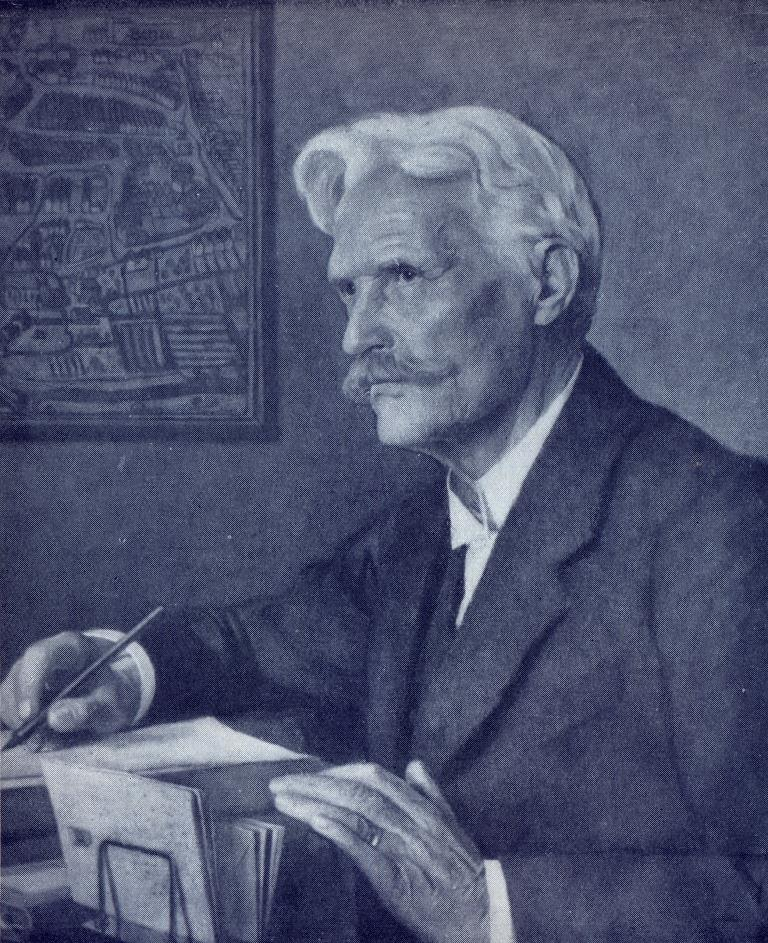
Dr. Julius Perathoner (1909)

After attending the Gymnasium in Bozen, Delug started painting, with encouragement from the painter Heinrich Schöpfer. He moved to Innsbruck and began studying history at the University of Innsbruck, staying until 1880, when he moved to Vienna and enrolled at the academy, studying under the painter Leopold Carl Müller. In 1885, he began a three-year period of travelling, visiting England, Italy, France, Germany and Holland, then settled in Munich in 1888 and accepted orders for historical and religious paintings. In 1896, he moved back to Vienna, and became a founding member of the Vienna Secession, though he resigned from it in 1898. Delug joined the academy as a professor in 1898, and became the director of the Allgemeine Malerschule (General School of Painting). His students there included Karl Sterrer, Anton Velim, Hans Fronius, Anton Kolig, Hubert Lanzinger, Albert Stolz, Hans Popp, Oddone Tomasi (the author of Delug's portrait above) and Franz Gruss. He visited America in 1923–24, and retired from teaching in 1928.

According to Josef Greiner, Delug denied Adolf Hitler a place at the academy because of inadequate drawing ability. However, according to Brigitte Hamann, Delug was perennially at odds with the rest of the faculty, who did not share his Modernist and Secessionist tastes, and in 1907–08, he was not in Vienna after another falling-out. Therefore, the admission decision largely fell to the other director of the painting school, Christian Griepenkerl. Other historians have also discounted Greiner as a fraud.

He was buried in Grinzinger Cemetery in a gewidmet Grab (honoured grave; group 19, number 290). In 1931, a road in Döbling was named the Delugstraße (Delug Street) in his honour. His painting The Markl Family (1907) was shown as part of Facing the Modern: The Portrait in Vienna 1900, an exhibition at the National Gallery, London, from October 2013 to January 2014.

== Selected works ==
- The Refugees (1886)
- The Holy Women at the Crossroads
- Alaric's funeral in Busento (1890)
- The Norns (1894)
- Three-piece votive picture for the Schorlemer family chapel (1898)
- Pieta for the chapel of Emperor Maximilian I in Santiago de Querétaro
