= August Krumholz =

Austrian architect

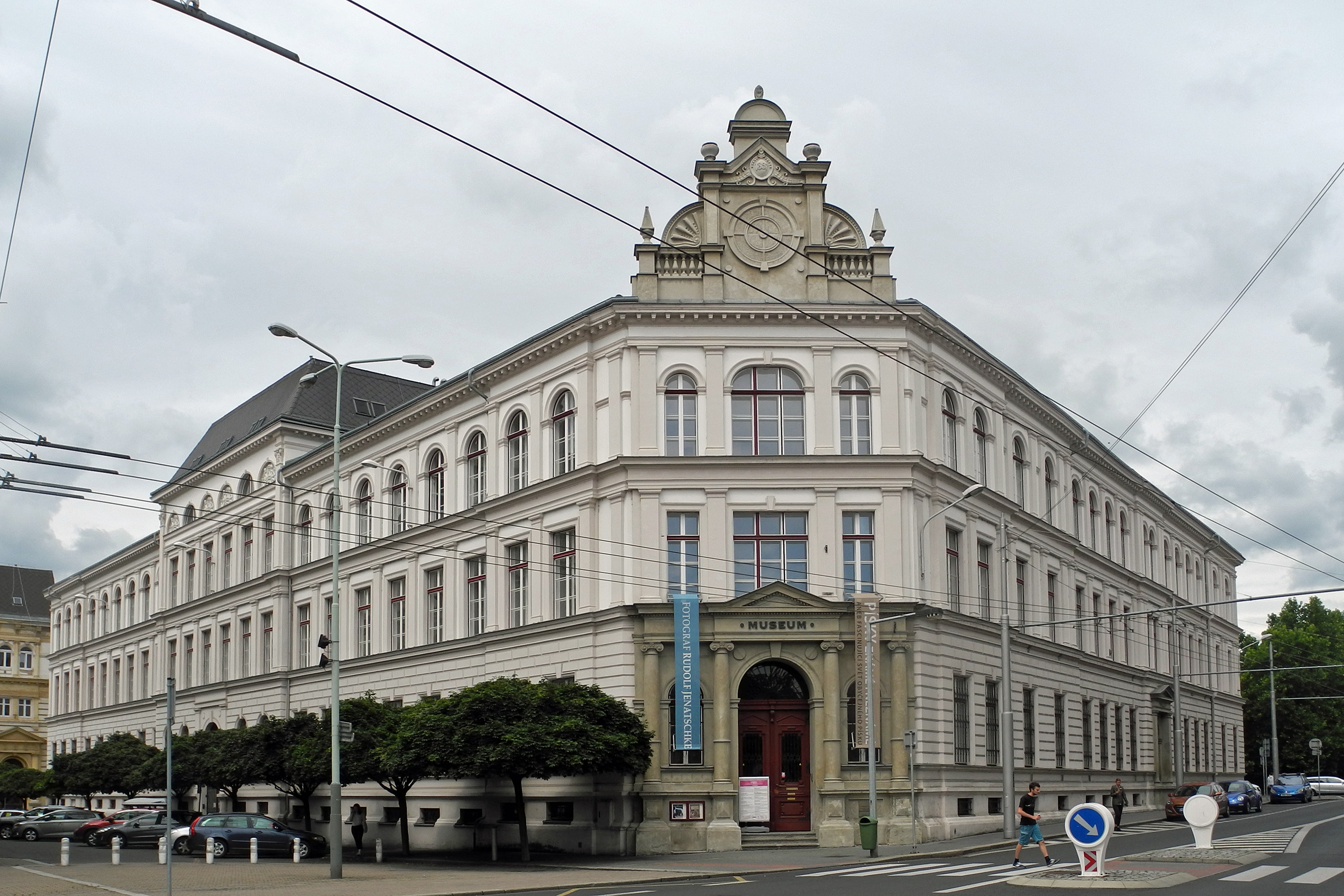
Municipal Museum of Ústí nad Labem

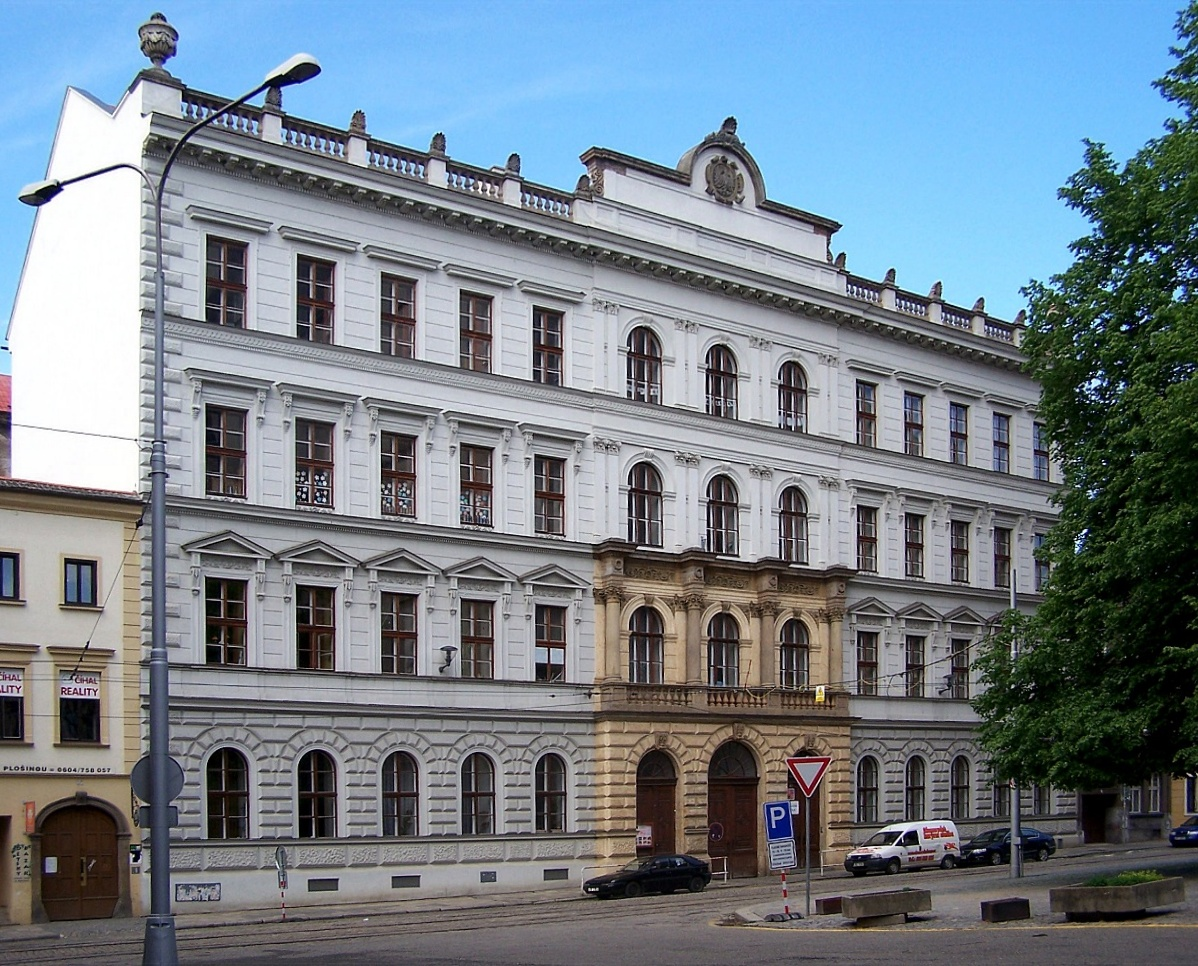
Komenium in Olomouc

August Krumholz (1845 – after June 1914) was an Austrian architect.

== Biography ==
Krumholz was born in 1845 in Straß in Steiermark, Austrian Empire. His father, also named August, was a construction manager from Marburg. He studied architecture at the Academy of Fine Arts, Vienna, from 1864 to 1869, first with Eduard van der Nüll, then Friedrich von Schmidt. In 1866 and 1869, he was awarded the Academy's Gundel-Prize for excellence. During the latter year, he also participated in a major exhibition in Munich.

He distinguished himself primarily as a school architect. A real school in Olomouc (the Komenium), built in 1870–1874, was his first fully independent design. Through Schmidt's mediation, and support from the educator, Erasmus Schwab (1831–1917), he created a prototype for a country school building that was displayed at the 1873 Vienna World's Fair. In 1876, he won a competition to establish a community school in Vimperk.

In addition to schools, he built the Dumba-Villa in Liezen, for the industrialist, Nikolaus Dumba (demolished 1960), and the Municipal Museum of Ústí nad Labem.

Despite his successes, he gradually withdrew from his profession during the 1880s and became a land owner, joining the Bauernvereins (Farmers' Association) in his father's hometown and introducing Anti-Semitic ideas, derived from the works of Georg von Schönerer. After 1893, he was based in Budapest, where he owned a construction company that provided supplies for the Austro-Hungarian Army. He later moved the company to Vienna, where it went bankrupt in 1906. Two years after that, he opened another architectural studio.

Within a few weeks, the Kronen Zeitung, Austria's largest newspaper, reported that he and his mistress had been arrested in Paris on charges of espionage. According to them, he had been in correspondence with Henri Julliot, a designer for the French firm of Lebaudy Frères, had become interested in their airship, the Patrie, and was in possession of material relating to its construction. The charges were apparently dismissed, following Julliot's intervention, but he was expelled from France.

He largely disappeared after that point. The last time he was mentioned in the press was on 14 June 1914. His date and place of death are unknown.
