= Karl Lehrmann =

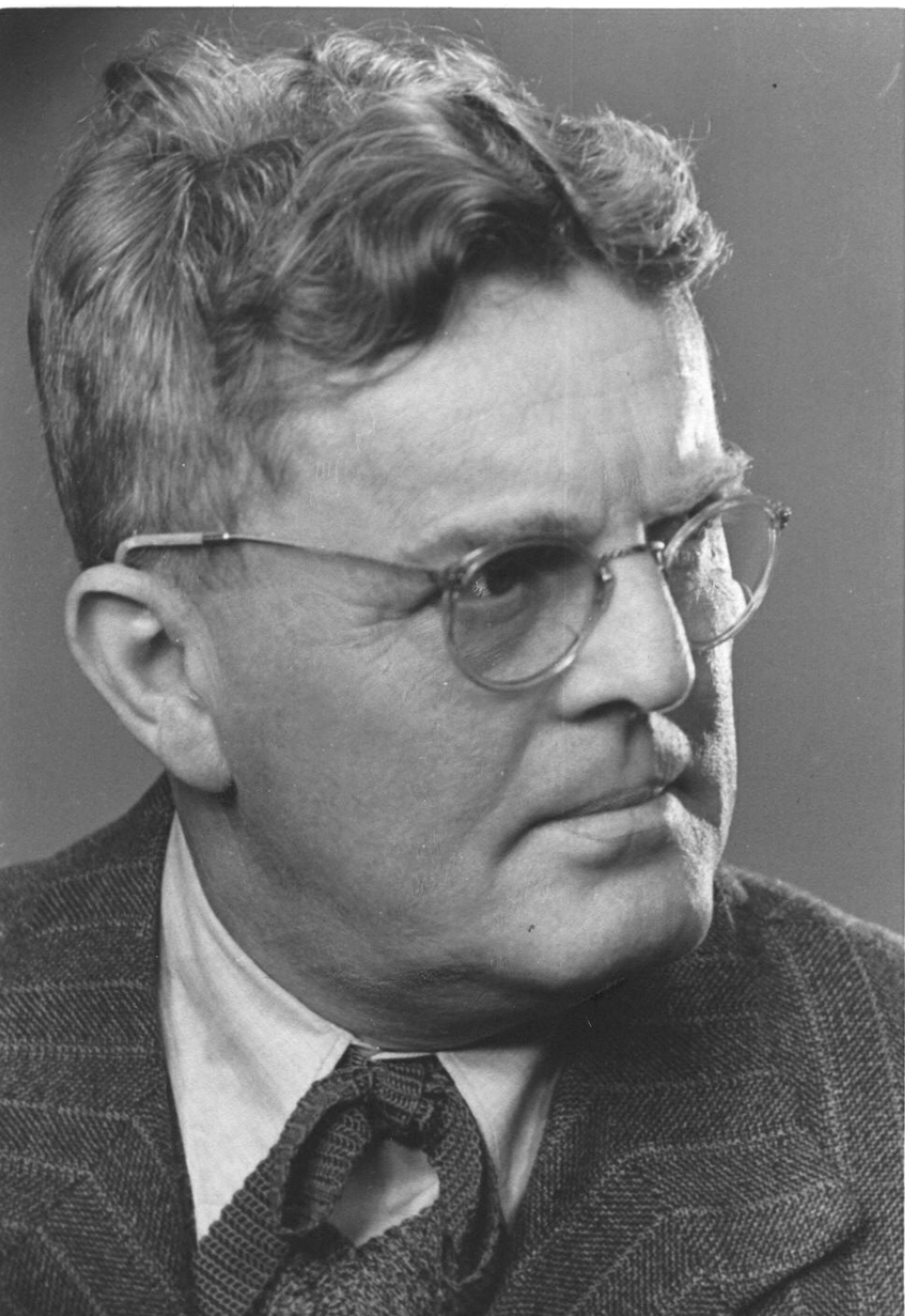
Karl Lehrmann (date unknown)

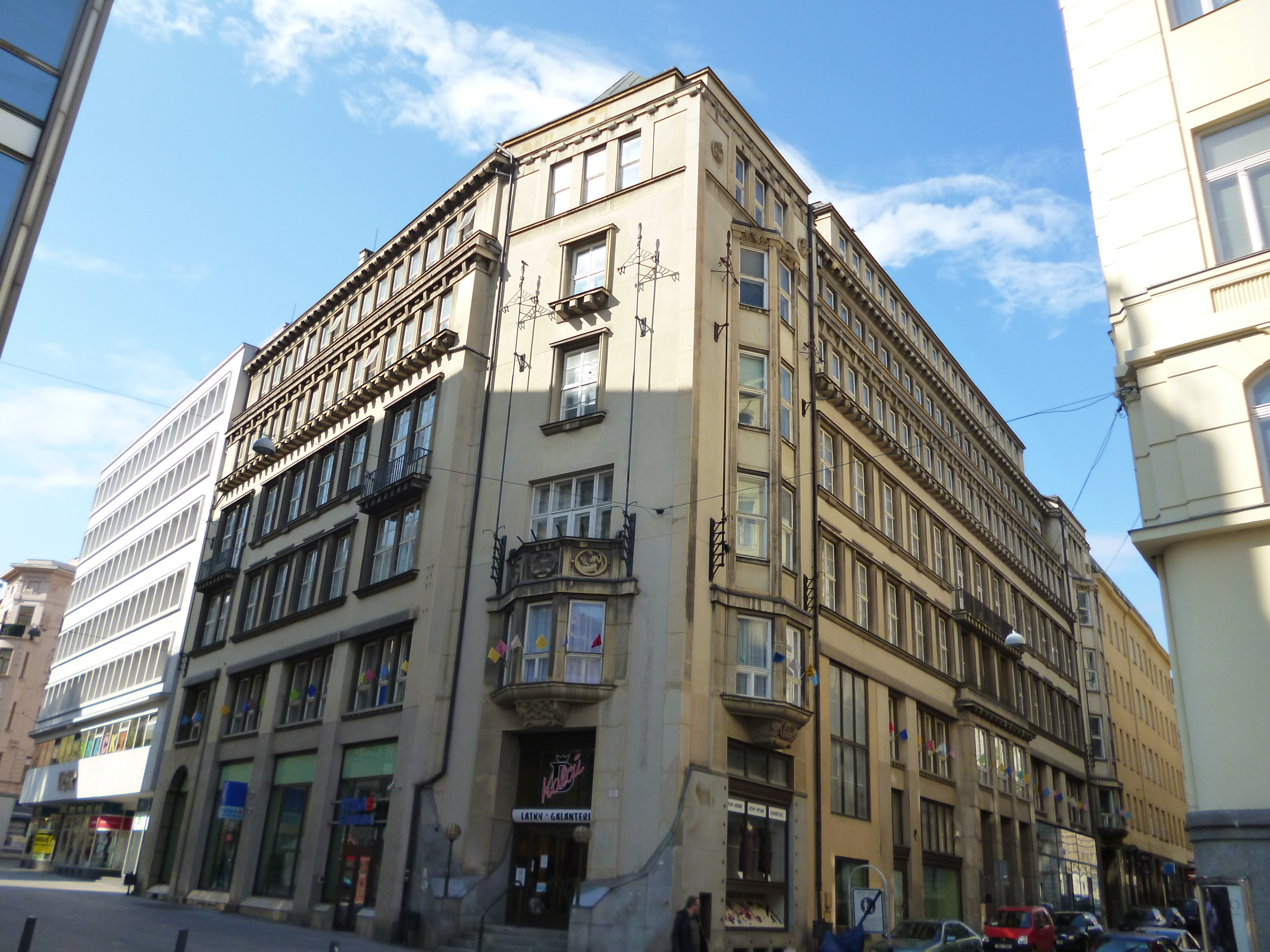
General Directorate of the Mining and Metallurgical Company South Moravian Region (now a savings bank)

Karl Lehrmann (29 September 1887 – 12 October 1957) was an Austrian architect and art professor.

== Life and work ==
Lehrmann was born on 29 September 1887 in Žatec. His father, Wenzl Lehrmann, was a shoemaker and his mother, Anna, worked in a local factory. From 1902 to 1905, he was apprenticed as a mason, then attended the Gewerbeschule in Plzeň until 1908, while working for a construction company. After that, he was enrolled at the Academy of Fine Arts, Vienna, from 1908 to 1912, where he studied in the master class of Friedrich Ohmann. In his final year there, he was awarded the Academy's Gundel-Prize for excellence. That same year, he was awarded second-place in a competition for work at the Kaiser-Franz-Josef-Museum.

After working for the architectural firm of Fellner & Helmer, he opened his own office was routinely involved in competitions for projects, although most of his designs were never realized. In 1915, he volunteered for military service and served with the railway troops in Korneuburg. After the war, he took a position teaching at the Technisch-gewerblichen Bundeslehranstalt in Mödling and received an award from the Marie Countess Hoyos-Amerling Foundation.

In 1920, when the Town Council of Perchtoldsdorf decided to issue Notgeld (emergency money), he was commissioned to design notes and coins in a variety of values. He also enjoyed his greatest professional success during this time; designing buildings in Brno, Linz, Perchtoldsdorf and Mödling, as well as Vienna.

He was awarded a Silver Cross for his educational work in 1930, and transferred to the Staatsgewerbeschule, Vienna, in 1935. Shortly after World War II, in 1946, he retired and wrote some architectural textbooks.

He died on 12 October 1957 in Mödling.
