= Leander Russ =

Austrian painter (1809–1864)

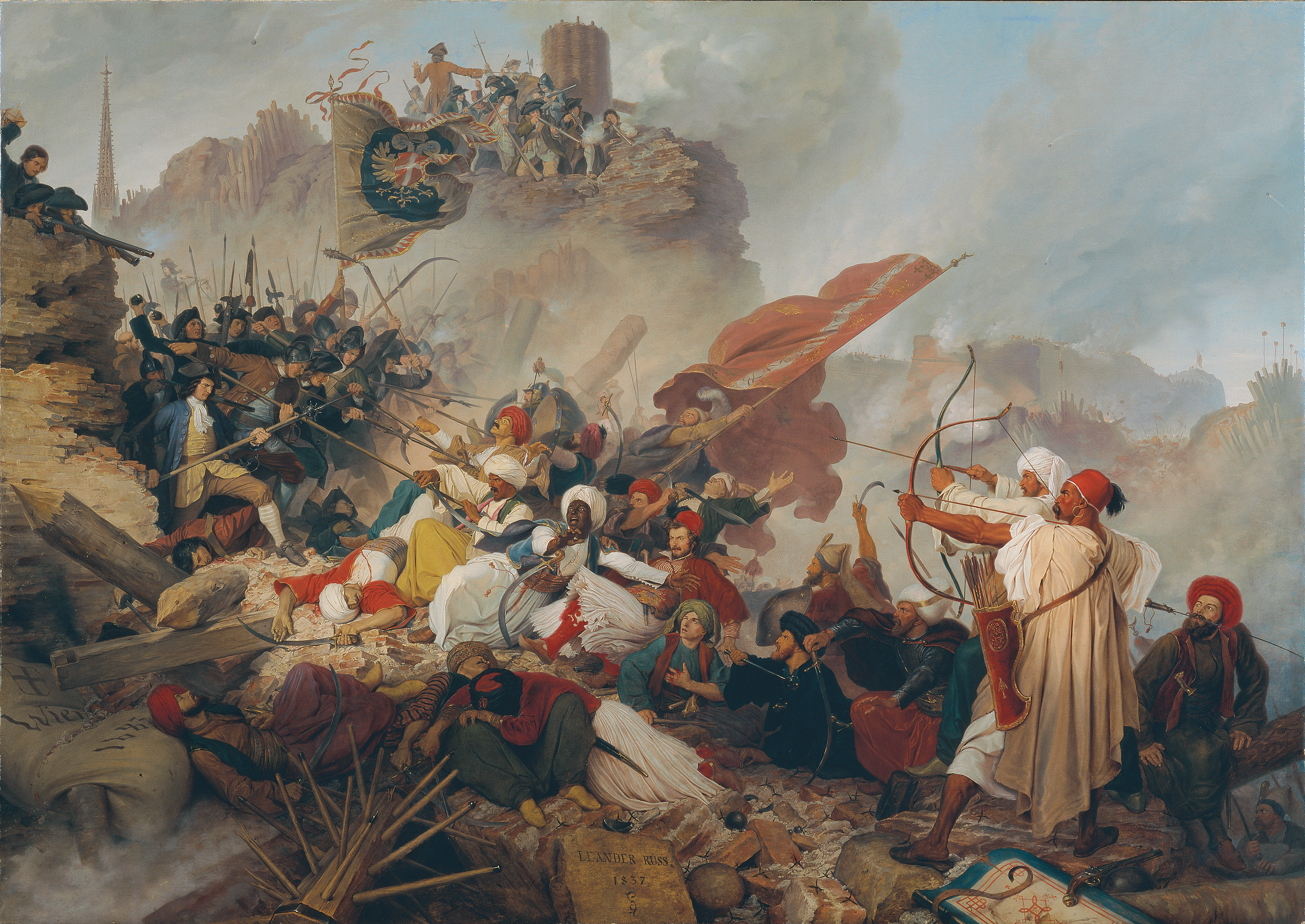
Turkish Forces Storming the Löwelbastei (Vienna, 1683)

Leander Russ (25 November 1809, Vienna - 8 March 1864, Vienna) was an Austrian painter.

== Biography ==
His father was the painter, Karl Russ. His sister, Clementine (1807–1869), also became an artist. After receiving his first art lessons at home, he attended the Academy of Fine Arts, Vienna, from 1823 to 1828, where he studied with Karl Gsellhofer and Josef Redl.

In 1828, he was awarded the Academy's Gundel-Prize for excellence and began participating in its exhibitions. In 1833, following study trips to Munich and Rome, he accompanied the diplomat, Anton von Prokesch-Osten, on a trip to the Middle East, which had a profound influence on his work. After 1841, he created numerous kaleidoscope images for Emperor Ferdinand I. He became a member of the Academy in 1848.

His final years were marred by illness and frequent stays at a sanatorium. He was interred in the Schmelzer Friedhof. In 1927, a street in Vienna's Hietzing district was named after him and his father.

Portraits, historical scenes and genre works constitute the majority of his oeuvre. Watercolors were his favorite medium. His kaleidoscopic pictures gained wide popularity. Many of his works are of an Orientalist nature.

== Sources ==
- Constantin von Wurzbach: "Ruß, Leander." In: Biographisches Lexikon des Kaiserthums Oesterreich (Biographical Lexicon of the Empire of Austria). Part 27 Kaiserlich-königliche Hof- und Staatsdruckerei, Vienna 1874, p. 288–290 (digitalised).
- Friedrich Pollak (1907). "Ruß, Leander". Allgemeine Deutsche Biographie (in German). Vol. 53. Leipzig: Duncker & Humblot. pp. 651–653.
- Heinz Schöny: "Russ Leander". In: Österreichisches Biographisches Lexikon 1815–1950 (ÖBL). Vol. 9, Austrian Academy of Sciences, Vienna 1988, ISBN 3-7001-1483-4, p. 333.
