= Ode to Polycrates =

Ancient Greek poem by Ibycus

Ode to Polycrates (also To Polycrates, 282a or S151) is an ancient Greek poem written by Ibycus and dedicated to Polycrates, tyrant of Samos. It was composed some time in the middle of the 6th century BC and displays close similarities to the work of Stesichorus.

== Preservation ==
The fragment containing the poem was found at Oxyrhynchus. It was published as Papyrus Oxyrhynchus XV 1790 in 1922. The scrap measures 31.5 cm by 20 cm, is eminently legible and only damaged by wormholes. Judging from the text's hand, its inscription has been dated to the second century BC. Since the publication of PMG it has been known as fragment 282a, or as S151 in the SLG.

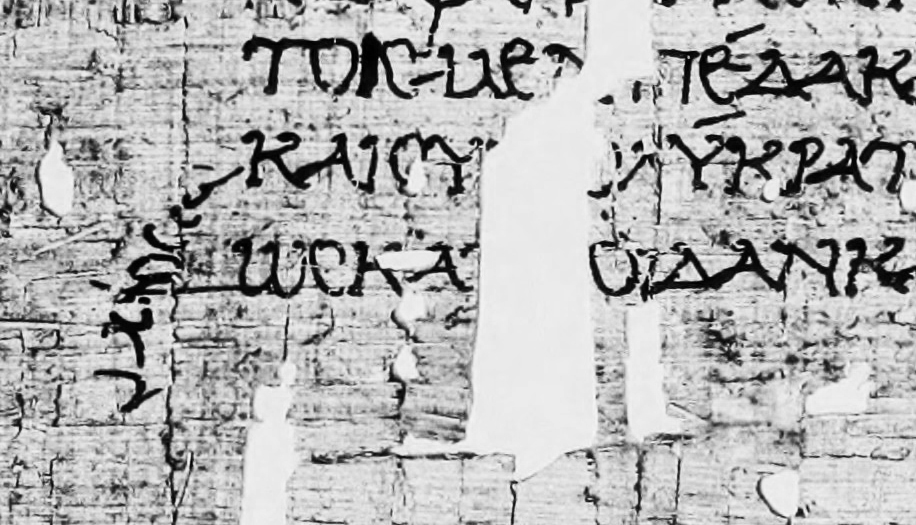
Fragments 282a containing the Ode to Polycrates

== The poem ==
Typically of Greek choral odes, the poem is structured in a triadic form, dominated by dactyls with aeolic elements. Its language broadly follows the dialect of epic with traces of the Doric dialect of Magna Graecia.

The decipherable parts of the fragment begin with a summary of the Trojan War, covering roughly the outline of the conflict and its protagonists. A shift occurs at line 36, as the poem turns to one Cyannippus whose beauty fascinated 'both Greeks and Trojans'. Similar, undying fame is then promised to the poet himself and Polycrates to whom the poem is dedicated. Because of its formal qualities as well as its interaction with Homeric motifs, the ode has been compared to the poems of Ibycus' contemporary Stesichorus. However, an attribution to the poet is unlikely.

== Dating ==
If the reference to Polycrates is genuine, the ode must have been composed after Ibycus' arrival on the island of Samos. According to the Suda, his arrival dates to the reign of Croesus who reigned over Sardis from c. 560 BC to c. 546 BC, as well as the 54th Olympiad (564-60 BC). Therefore, the poem may be dated to some time in the middle of the 6th century BC.

== See also ==
- Stesichorus
- 6th century BC in poetry

== Works cited ==
- Barron, J. P. (1969) 'Ibycus: To Polycrates', Bulletin of the Institute of Classical Studies 16: 119–49. (Includes the full surviving text with commentary.)
- Budelmann, F. (2018) Greek Lyric. A Selection (Cambridge)
- Campbell, D. (1991) Greek Lyric III: Stesichorus, Ibycus, Simonides, and Others (Cambridge, MA)
- Grenfell, Hunt (1898) The Oxyrhynchus papyri XVI
