= Heinrich Schwemminger =

Austrian painter (1803–1884)

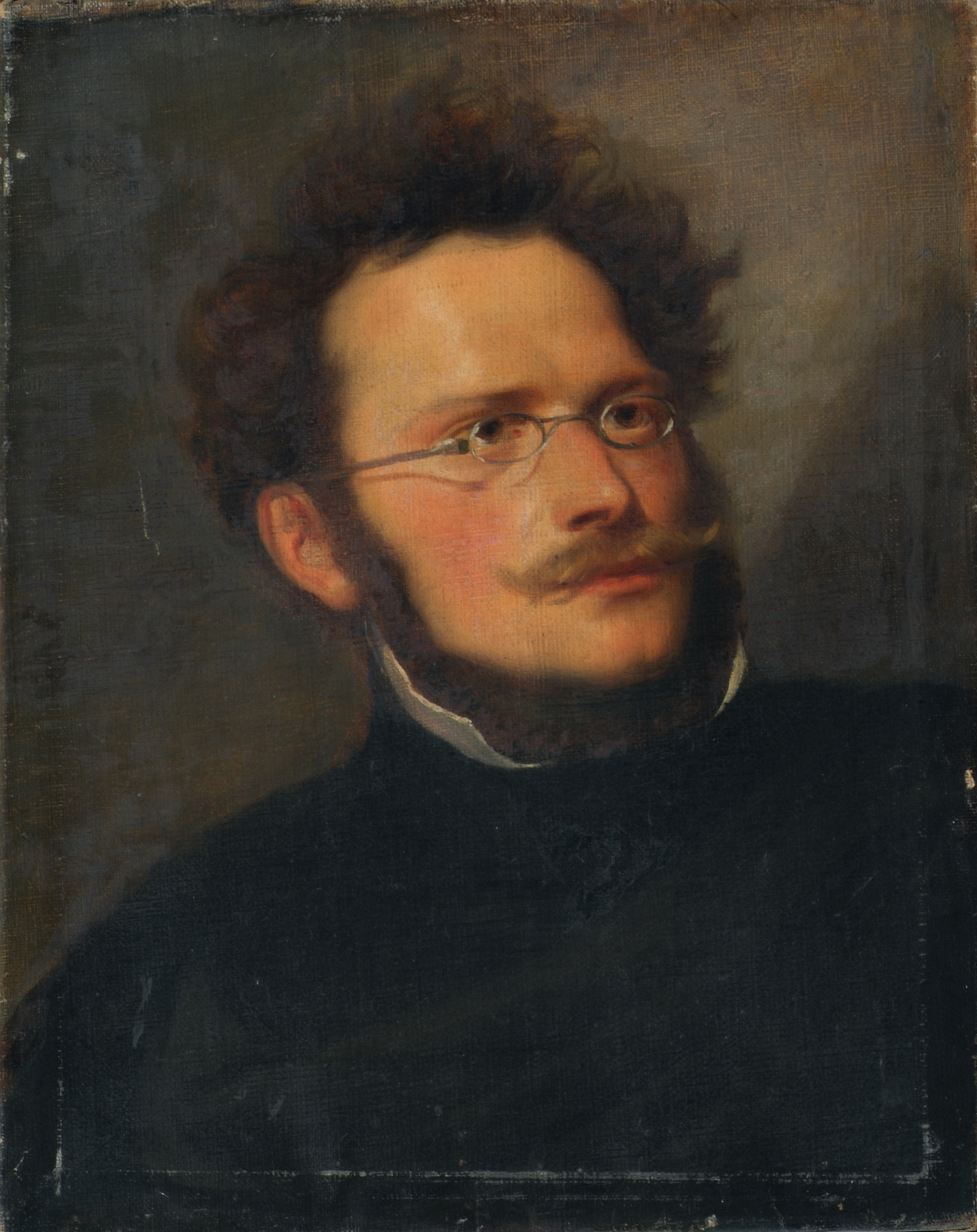
Heinrich Schwemminger; portrait by Joseph Hasslwander

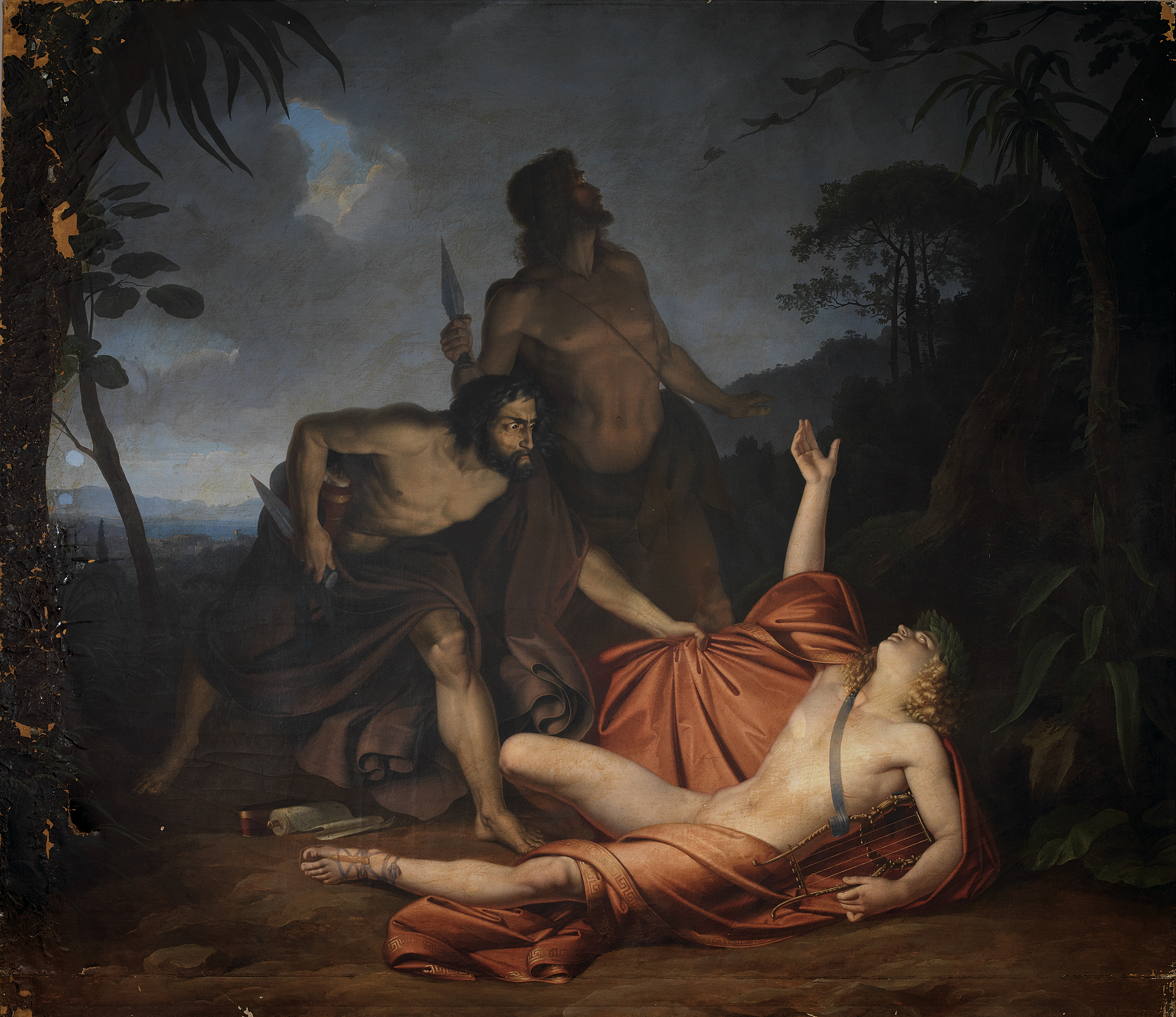
"The Cranes of Ibycus", from the poem by Friedrich Schiller

Heinrich Schwemminger (7 January 1803, Vienna - 13 March 1884, Vienna) was an Austrian history painter.

== Life and work ==
His father, Anton Schwemminger (1764-1808), was a porcelain painter. His younger brother, Josef, also became a painter. His sister, Theresia, married the painter Karl Schubert; a brother of the composer Franz Schubert.

From 1818 to 1830, with a few interruptions, he studied at the Academy of Fine Arts, Vienna. After 1823, he specialized in history painting. He found his inspiration in the Classical sculptors and the works of Raphael. While at the Academy, in 1820, he was awarded the Gundel-Prize for excellence and, after graduating, he received the Reichel-Prize (1833). During those years, he spent much of his time in Munich, where he joined the group of artists who were associated with Moritz von Schwind. Thanks to a scholarship, he was able to spend the years from 1837 to 1842 in Rome.

Upon returning, in 1843, he was hired as Curator for the gallery at the Academy. In 1848, he became a member and, the following year, a Professor. From 1857 to 1874, he was the Director of the gallery. Following a major reorganization in 1866, he published the first complete catalog for the collection. In 1868, he became a member of the Vienna Künstlerhaus. He also worked on the art-related equipment at the Vienna State Opera and various other state theatres.

He died at the age of eighty-one. In 1958, a street in Vienna's Inzersdorf district was named after him.
