= Anton Velim =

Austrian painter

- Born: 24 February 1892; Vienna, Austria-Hungary
- Died: 13 October 1954 (aged 62); Vienna, Austria
- Occupation: Painter

Anton Velim (24 February 1892 – 13 October 1954) was an Austrian painter and graphic artist.

== Early life and education ==
Anton Velim was born in Vienna, where his father was a tailor. From 1908 to 1912, he attended the Höhere Graphische Bundes-Lehr- und Versuchsanstalt, then studied at the Academy of Fine Arts with Alois Delug.

== Career ==
In 1910, Velim had already held his first official position as an assistant to Alfred Roller at the Erste Internationale Jagd-Ausstellung. In 1913, he designed postcards for the Vienna Werkstätte and exhibited with the Vienna Secession. In 1916, he was awarded the Academy's Gundel-Prize for excellence. The members of the Wittgenstein family were among his most notable clients. In the 1920s, he worked at the art colony in Grinzing.

When the colony was disbanded and Velim lost his studio there, his financial situation worsened. In 1930, he held his last exhibition with the Wiener Secession, and his works were part of the art competition at the 1936 Summer Olympics. Despite these moderate successes, he had to take a position as a vocational teacher to avoid poverty. His personal life also went poorly, as his only son was killed in World War II, and his wife filed for a separation after over twenty years of marriage.

Velim made no effort to promote his works for almost a decade, until 1946, when he became a member of the Vienna Künstlerhaus. His last exhibition was with them, shortly before his death, of which there are two accounts. In Die Presse, the cause was given as a heart attack but other, international sources gave it as varnish poisoning.
