= Gábor Melegh =

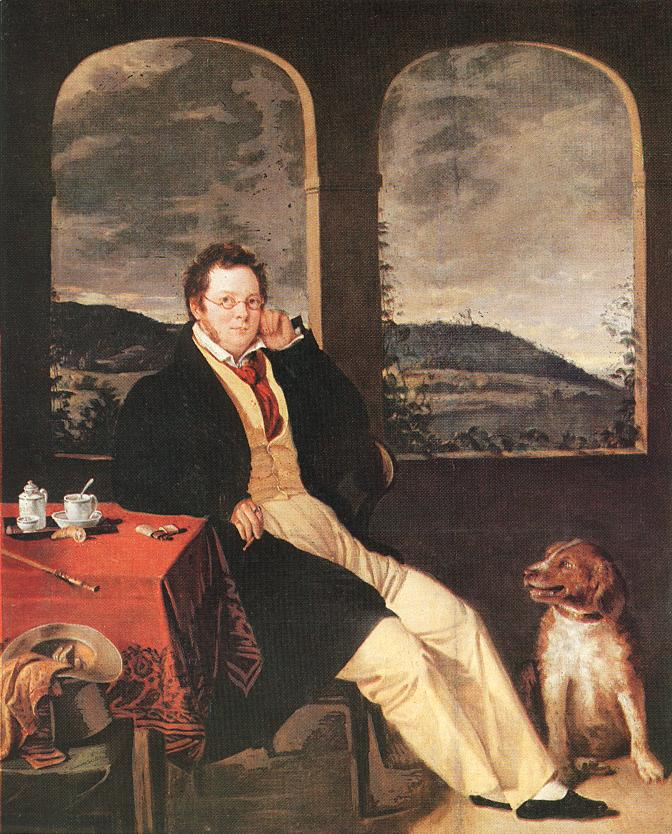
Portrait of Franz Schubert, 1827

Gábor Melegh (14 May 1801 – 1835) was a Hungarian lithographer and painter, who worked in the Biedermeier style.

== Life and work ==
Melegh was born in Vršac in 1801. From 1817 to 1823 he was enrolled at the Academy of Fine Arts, Vienna, graduating with honours. In 1818, he was awarded their Gundel-Prize for excellence. During breaks from the Academy, he returned home to work. He also took students, Károly Brocky being the best known. Some of his works appeared in magazines, notably the literary journal, Aurora, published by his friend, Károly Kisfaludy. Some sources indicate that Melegh drowned in the sea off Trieste in 1835 while on a trip to Italy.

His works include watercolours, miniatures, chalk drawings, lithographs and etchings. Some of Melegh's drawings and oil paintings may be seen in the Hungarian National Gallery, including a portrait of composer Franz Schubert.

== Sources ==
- Biographical notes @ Képzőművészet Magyarországon
- Biography and appreciation @ Hét Nap
- Biographical notes @ Kieselbach Gallery
