= Karl Sterrer =

Austrian painter and engraver

Karl Sterrer (4 December 1885 – 10 June 1972) was an Austrian painter and engraver.

== Biography ==
Karl Sterrer was the son of the sculptor Carl Sterrer.

He studied at the Academy of Fine Arts, Vienna under Alois Delug and Christian Griepenkerl. Equally adept at both landscapes and portraits, he won the prestigious Prix de Rome in 1908. This was followed by many more awards, including the Reichel Prize, in 1919.

Around 1910 Sterrer was one of the first Austrian artists to be intrigued by the beginnings of German Expressionism. Building upon the deep, dark lines of drypointing, Sterrer began to cut his landscape compositions to their essentials. During the first two decades of the twentieth century, Sterrer worked and traveled extensively in Germany and Austria.

In 1921, he accepted the post of Professor of Fine Arts at the Vienna Academy. Today, examples of Sterrer's original prints and paintings are housed in the collections of the Carnegie Institute, Pittsburgh, the Dresden Gallery and the Austrian Academy in Vienna.
