= Karl Ruß (painter) =

Austrian painter (1779–1843)

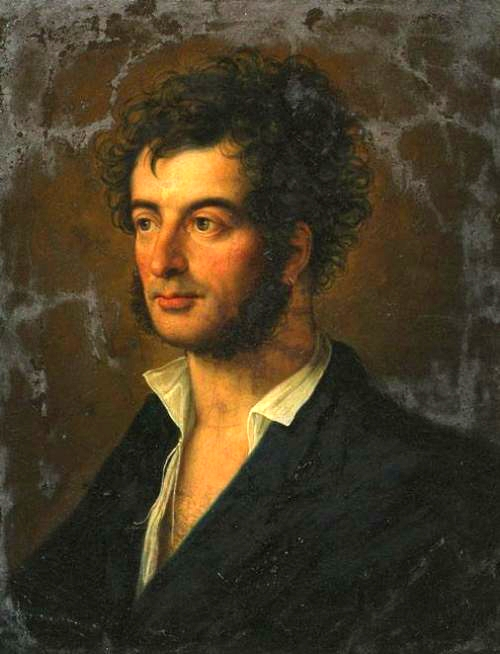
- Self-portrait (1813)
- Born: Karl Ruß; 4 August 1779; Vienna, Austria
- Died: 19 September 1843 (aged 64); Vienna, Austria
- Known for: Painter
- Movement: Biedermeier

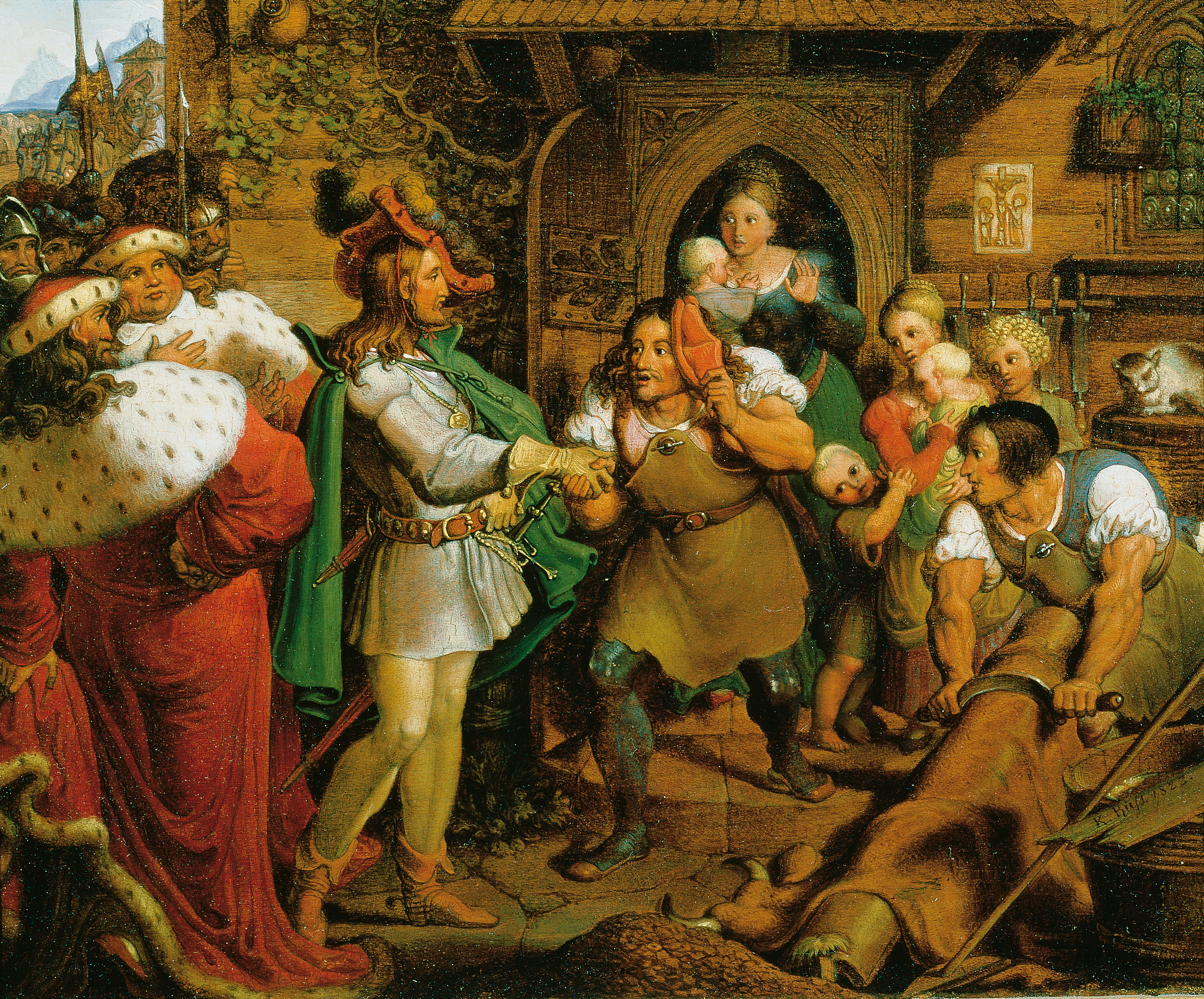
Emperor Maximilian Visits the Craftsmen

Karl Ruß (4 August 1779, Vienna - 19 September 1843, Vienna) was an Austrian painter in the Biedermeier style.

== Life and work ==
He was born to a poor family. When they moved to Neustadt, he began to display some artistic talent, and received lessons from local artists. They returned to Vienna in 1793, and he was able to enroll at the Academy of Fine Arts, Vienna. He initially studied flower painting with Johann Baptist Drechsler, then landscapes with Johann Christian Brand. Following Brand's death, in 1795, he switched to history painting, with Hubert Maurer as his instructor. After graduation, he made his living painting portraits and working for booksellers. He also studied etching and copper engraving.

He was married in 1806 and, thanks to some recently acquired patronage, was hired to work on decorative paintings at the Albertina. In addition, he executed wall paintings for Count Johann Philipp Staadion and decorative work for Duke Albert Casimir, as well as being part of a group that worked for the Empress Consort, Maria Ludovika of Austria-Este. Despite this success, the loss of a pension, which he had been planning to use for studies in Italy, caused his financial situation to become unstable and he had to return to portrait painting.

Thanks to a recommendation from the landscape painter, Christoph Heinrich Kniep, he was introduced to Archduke John of Austria, who was looking for a "Kammermaler" (Chamber Painter). Ruß was engaged and accompanied him on hikes throughout Styria; making sketches and finding motifs for his favorite types of art. His most important commission involved a series of watercolors, depicting the native costumes of that region; from the bourgeoisie to the peasants. These works preserve all that is authentically known about their clothing for the period of 1810 to 1820. Later, the folklorist, Viktor Geramb, included many of Ruß' images in his definitive book on Styrian costumery (Steirisches Trachtenbuch, 1932).

From 1821, he served as the first Custodian of the Picture Gallery at Belvedere Palace, a position that he held for three years. Once again, he was able to find patrons, including some in France, and had a busy career, with a constant stream of commissions. In 1843, he fell ill with "dropsy of the chest" and died a short time later, aged sixty-four.

His son, Leander, was also a painter. A street in Vienna's Hietzing district was named after them in 1927.

== Bibliography ==
- Eduard Melly: Karl Russ. Umriss eines Künstlerlebens, Vienna 1844 (Full text).
- Constantin von Wurzbach: "Ruß, Karl." In: Biographisches Lexikon des Kaiserthums Oesterreich (Biographical Lexicon of the Empire of Austria). Part 27 Kaiserlich-königliche Hof- und Staatsdruckerei, Vienna 1874, p. 277–288 (digitalised).
- Anton Schlossar (1890). "Ruß, Karl". Allgemeine Deutsche Biographie (in German). Vol. 30. Leipzig: Duncker & Humblot. pp. 5–7.
- E. Beaufort: "Russ Karl". In: Österreichisches Biographisches Lexikon 1815–1950 (ÖBL). Vol. 9, Austrian Academy of Sciences, Vienna 1988, ISBN 3-7001-1483-4, p. 332 f. (Direct links to "p. 332", "p. 333")
