= Adolf Wagner von der Mühl =

Austrian sculptor (1884–1962)

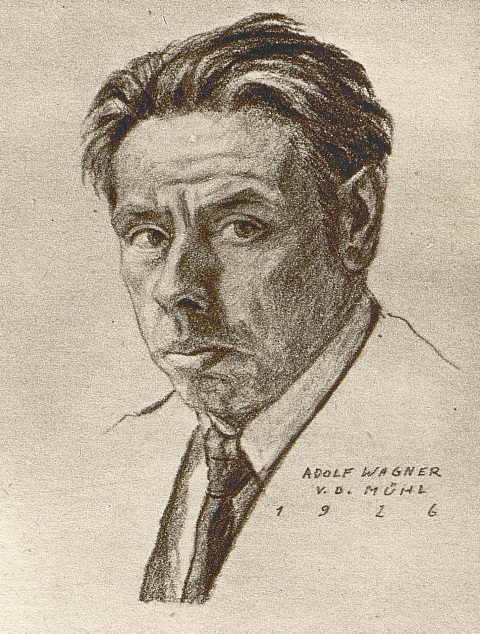
Self-portrait (1926)

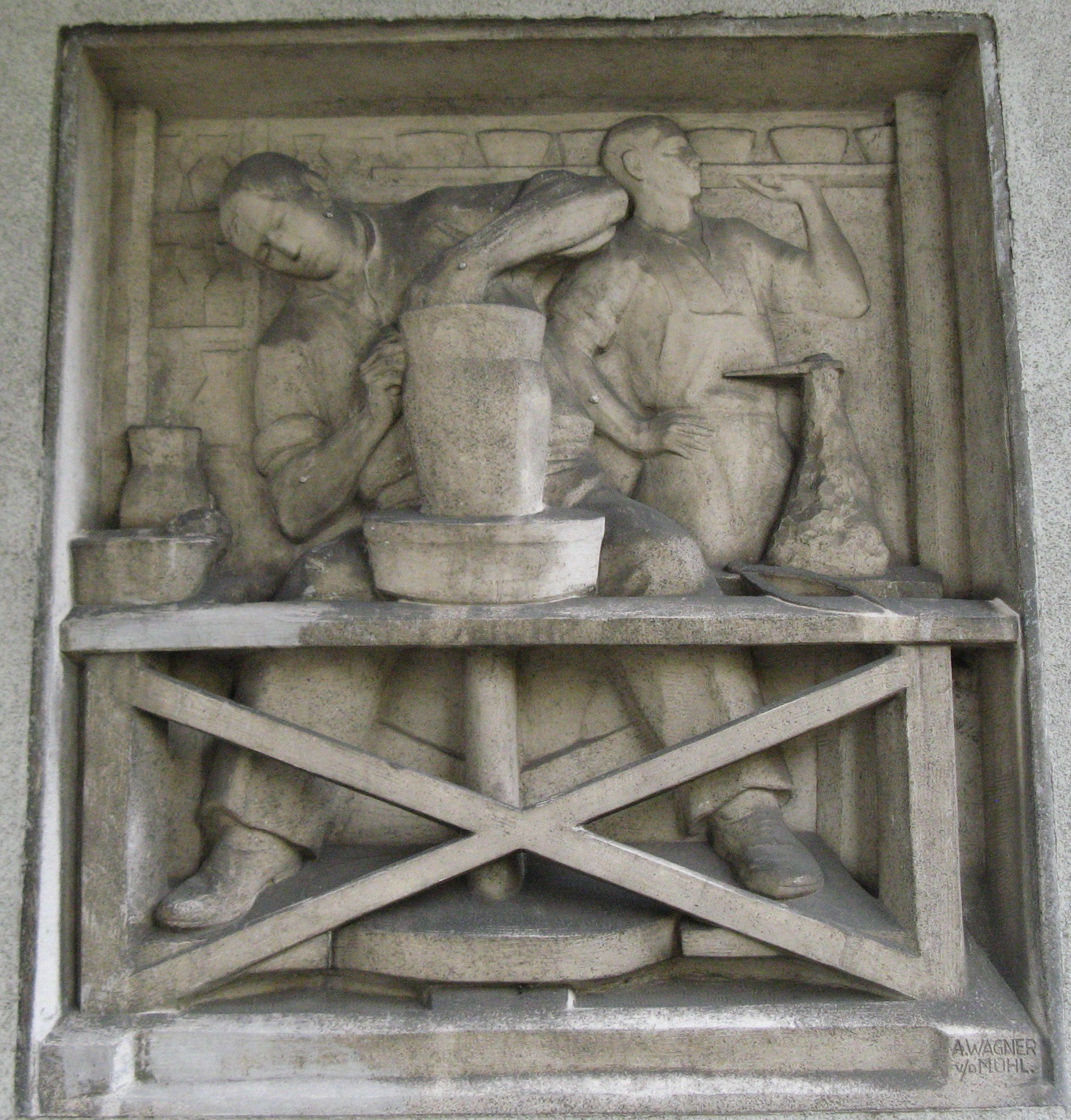
Relief, Troststraße, Vienna

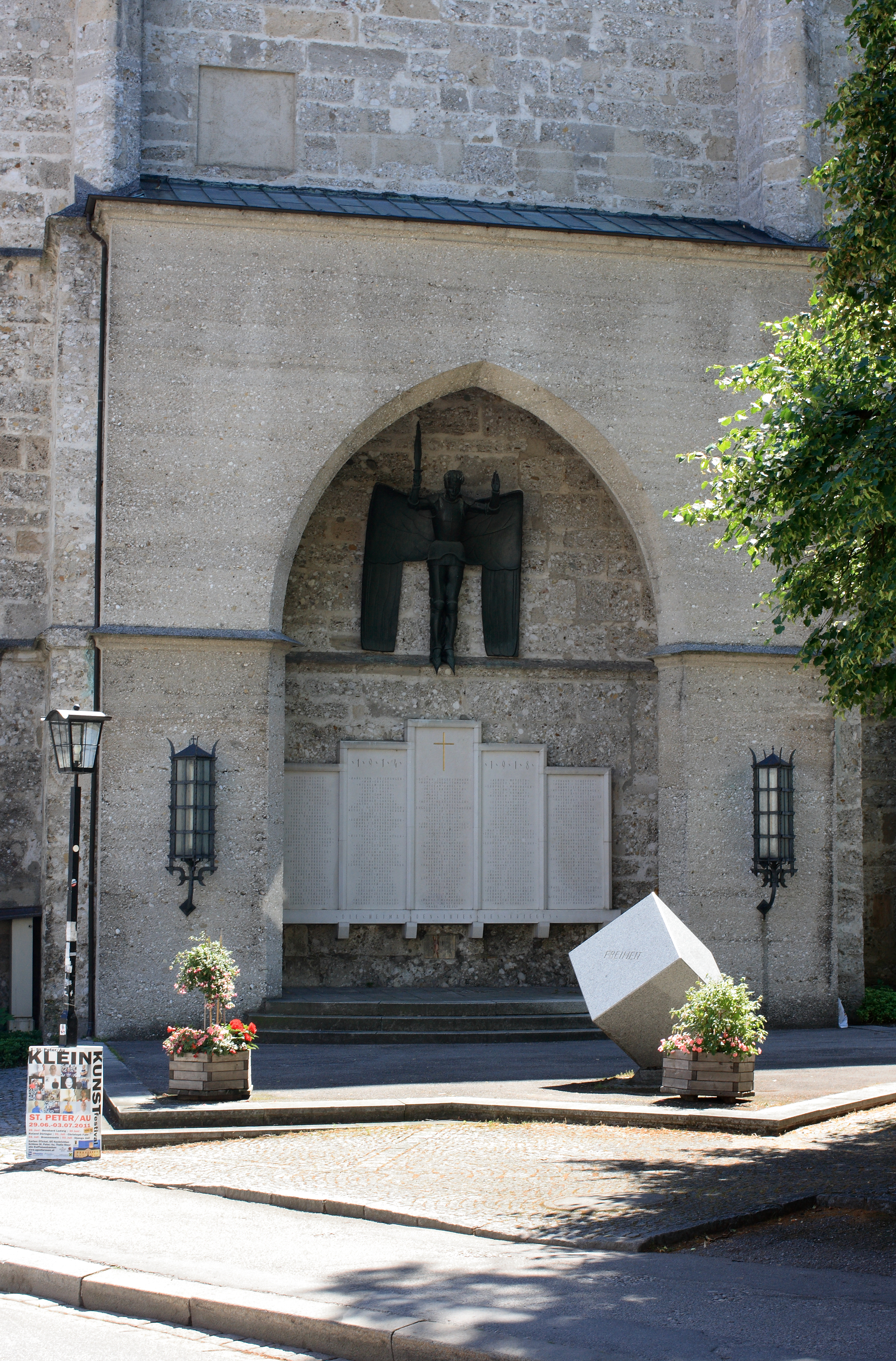
Stadtpfarrkirche Steyr

Adolf Wagner von der Mühl (2 February 1884 in Rohrbach in Oberösterreich – 27 August 1962 in Vienna) was an Austrian sculptor.

Wagner von der Mühl was born in the Upper Austrian Mühlviertel. He studied sculpture at the Academy of Fine Arts, Munich and Academy of Fine Arts Vienna, where he worked as a freelance sculptor.

In 1910 he received the Dumba-Award for his sculpture Mutterglück and the Gundel-Award for his Kruzifixus, 1912 the Rome-Award for the stone sculpture Berggeist in Linz. He was a member of the Vienna Künstlerhaus and the Innviertler Künstlergilde. In 1949 he became Professor HC. His work was part of the sculpture event in the art competition at the 1928 Summer Olympics.

== Works (selection) ==
- Mutterglück (1910), Kleinbronze (Heimathaus Haslach)
- Kruzifixus (1910), for the woodcarving altar, Schloss Hartheim
- Berggeist, sandstone sculpture, Linz (1912)
- Schnopfhagen monument, Hansberg (St. Johann am Wimberg) (1913)
- Linzer Wehrmann (1915), wood, life-size, Linz (Museum Nordico)
- Kleinbronzen (1920)
- Pietà, white marble, life-size, Friedenskirche Linz (1923)
- Bronzefigur Erzengels Michael (based on a design from Josef Franz Riedel (1933)), Stadtpfarrkirche Steyr
- Engelbert Dollfuß-bust, Rohrbach (1934)

== Exhibitions (selection) ==
- Skulptur in Oberösterreich 1880 bis 1990, exhibition, Oberösterreichisches Landesmuseum in Linz (1996)
- Collective exhibition, Kunstverein in Hamburg (1911)
- Collective exhibition, Ortsverein Dresden der Allgemeinen Deutschen Kunstgenossenschaft - Kunstverein in Hamburg (1911)
- Collection, Künstlerhaus Wien (1923)
- Collective exhibition, Oö. Landesmuseum in Linz (1926)
- Art exhibition "Ursprung und Einheit" Wagner von der Mühl (1884–1962), Villa sinnenreich, Rohrbach-Berg (2015)

== Literature ==
- Hermann Ubell: Bildhauer Adolf Wagner von der Mühl. In: Der getreue Eckart. 4, Vienna, 1926, p. 168–177.
- Gerhard Lanzerstorfer: Information über den Bildhauer Adolf Wagner von der Mühl. In: Mitteilungen des Oberösterreichischen Volksbildungswerkes. Jg. 23 (1973), Heft 9/10
- Anton Brand: Bildhauer Adolf Wagner von der Mühl: seine Herkunft und sein Werk. Bildband. Museumsinitiative Rohrbach, 2014.
