= Victor Luntz =

Austrian architect (1840–1903)

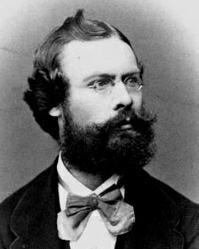
Victor Luntz (date unknown)

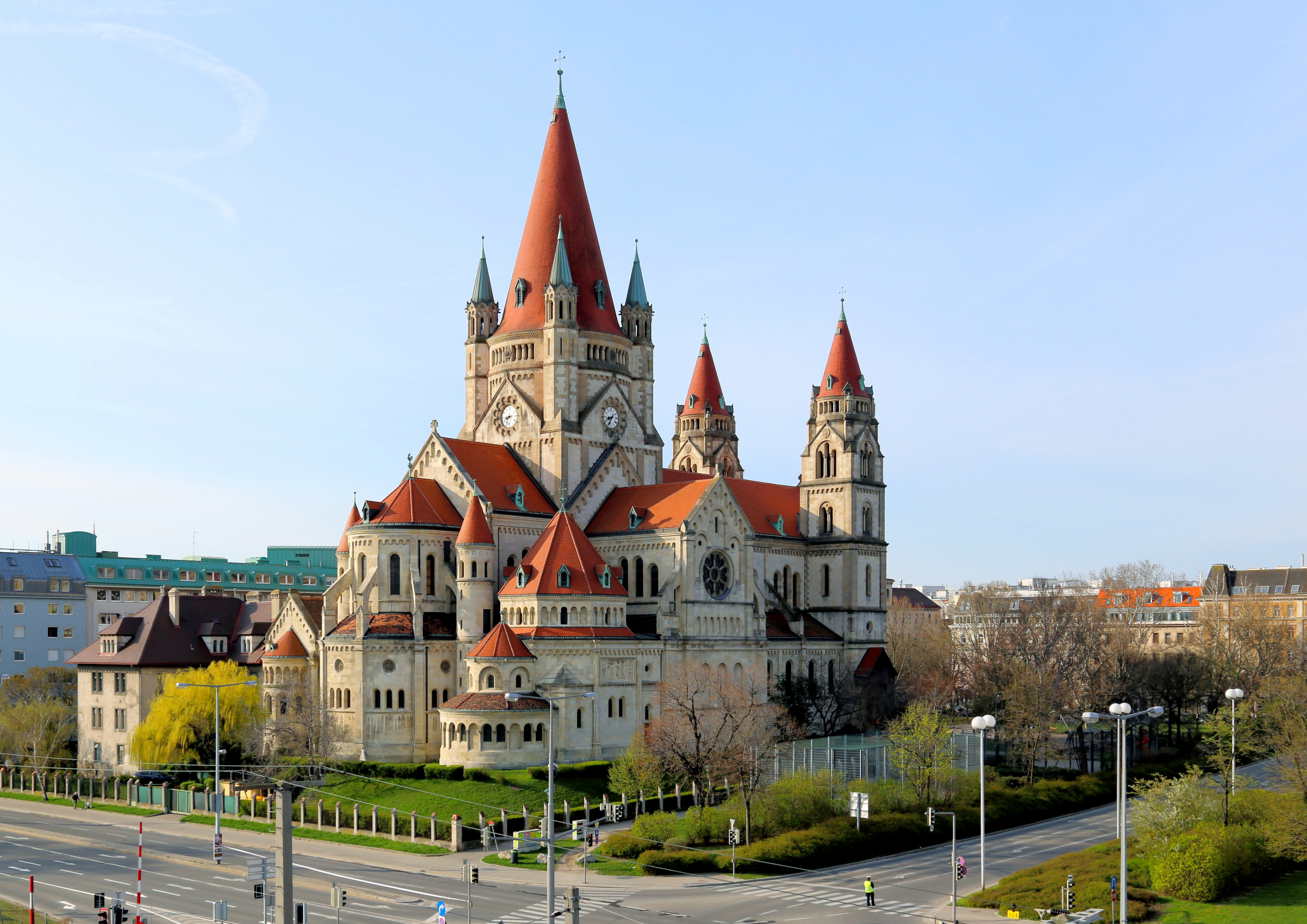
St. Francis of Assisi Church

Victor Luntz (8 March 1840, Ybbs an der Donau - 12 October 1903, Vienna) was an Austrian architect and Professor.

== Life and work ==
His father, Andreas Luntz, was a local official. In 1847, the family moved to Vienna where, from 1856 to 1860, he studied at the Polytechnic Institute then, from 1860 to 1864, at the Academy of Fine Arts. He was awarded the academy's Gundel-Prize for excellence in 1862. His primary instructors there were August Sicard von Sicardsburg and Eduard van der Nüll. Later, he worked with Friedrich von Schmidt, who was building the new Vienna City Hall. He also completed an apprenticeship as a stonemason.

In 1874, he married Auguste Felicitas Wielemans, sister of the architect, Alexander Wielemans, in whose studio he was working. In 1885 the College of Technology (the former Polytechnic Institute) named him to fill the chair of Medieval and Christian architecture, left vacant by the death of Heinrich von Ferstel, two years previously. From 1892 until his death, he was the head Professor of the special school for Medieval architecture at the academy. His notable students included Hubert Gangl, Rudolf Wiskoczil and Max Hegele, who designed the church at the Wiener Zentralfriedhof.

His wife died in 1885, leaving him with five sons. His eldest, Adolf, became a well known landscape painter.

Few of his works were especially prominent; the notable exception being the St. Francis of Assisi Church, one of several church buildings he designed. He also did restorative work and expansions at the Maria am Gestade church and the Minoritenkirche.

He had a stroke while attending a meeting at the academy, and died shortly after, at the age of sixty-three. In 1920, a street in Vienna's Brigittenau district was named after him.

== Sources ==
- Felix Czeike (Ed.): Historisches Lexikon Wien, Vol.4, Kremayr & Scheriau, 1995 ISBN 3-218-00546-9 pg.116 f.
- "Victor Luntz". In: Österreichisches Biographisches Lexikon 1815–1950 (ÖBL). Vol. 5, Austrian Academy of Sciences, Vienna 1972, p. 370.
