= Die Kraniche des Ibykus =

Ballad by Friedrich Schiller

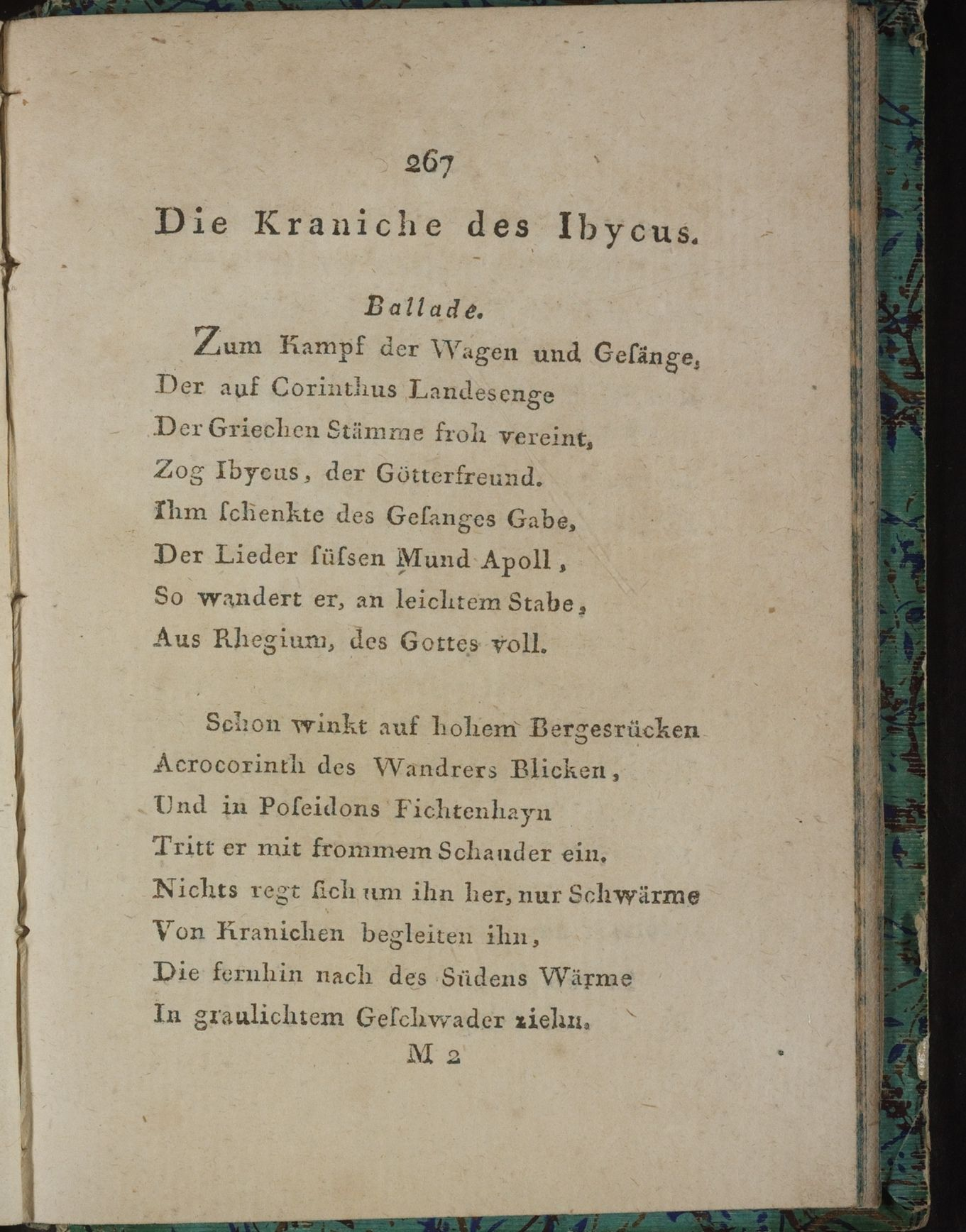
Die Kraniche des Ibycus

"Die Kraniche des Ibycus" is a ballad by Friedrich Schiller, written in 1797, the year of his friendly ballad competition with Goethe. It is set in the 6th century BC and based on the murder of Ibycus.
