= Rudolf Wiskoczil =

Austrian architect

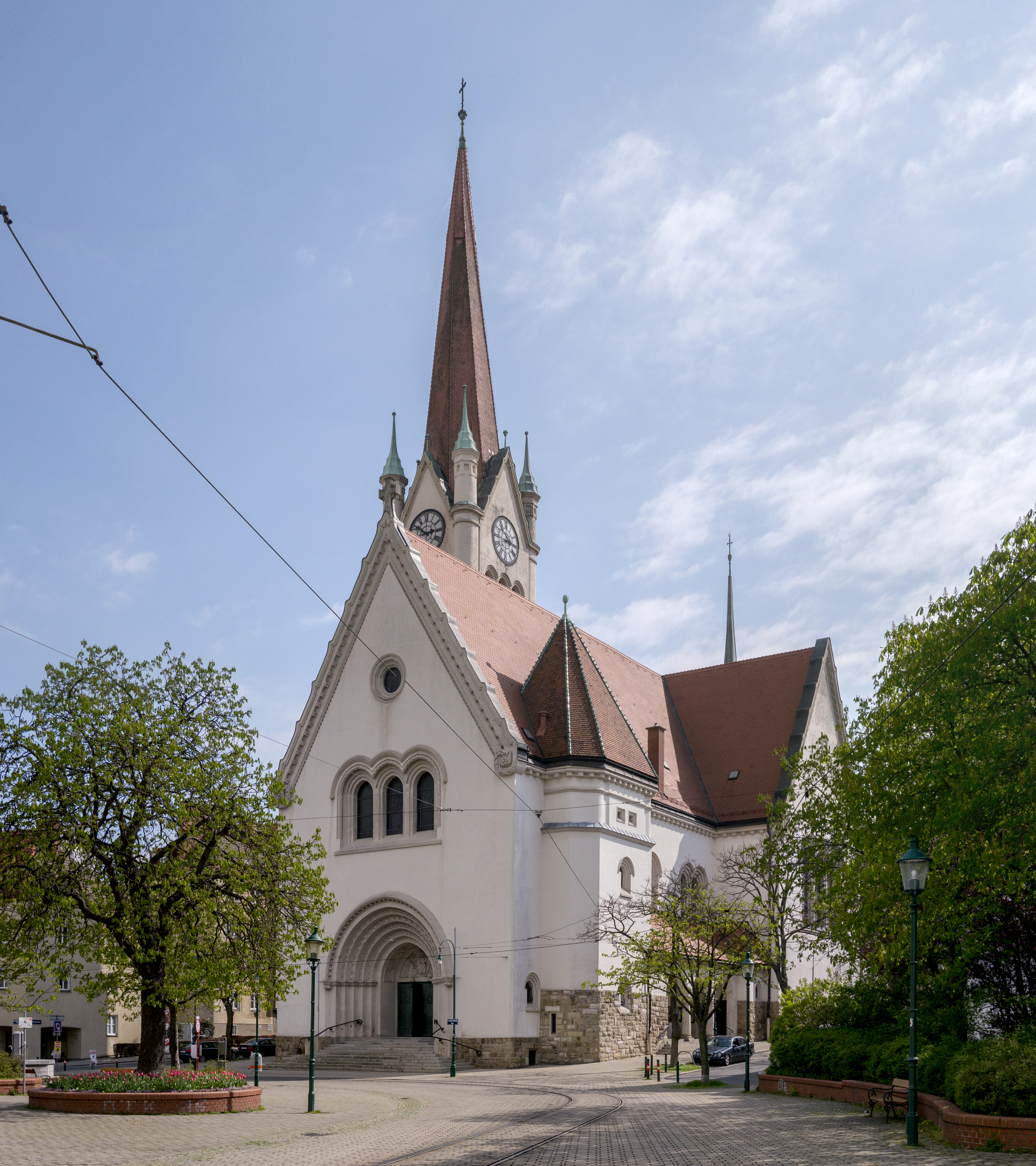
Alt-Ottakringer Parish Church

Rudolf Wiskoczil or Wiszkoczil (14 March 1870, in Vienna – 17 August 1925, in Vienna) was an Austrian architect, in the style of Friedrich von Schmidt. In 1919, he changed his last name to Werian.

== Life and work ==
His father, Sándor Wiszkoczil, of Hungarian-Slovak origin, was also an architect and builder who moved from Budapest to Vienna around 1869. His parents were not yet married at the time he was born. He grew up in near poverty and was therefore exempt from paying fees at the Gewerbeschule (Arts and Crafts School). Thanks to a scholarship, he was able to attend the Academy of Fine Arts, where he studied with Friedrich von Schmidt and Victor Luntz. Medieval church architecture was his primary course of study.

He probably worked with his father before becoming a freelance architect, sometime in the 1890s. During this time, he was primarily involved in building churches. Eventually, he became an assistant at the Ministry of Public Works. His first assignment was in the Viennese district of Ottakring, where the parish church had become much too small for its growing congregation. Wiskoczil was entrusted with designing the new church, which had to be built on the same property, around the old church. It also had to be finished in time for Emperor Franz Joseph's 80th birthday. This was largely accomplished, and he received the civilian Cross of Merit from the Emperor.

Following the end of World War I, he remained in the civil service, with the building department of the Ministry of Trade and Commerce, but changed his name to Werian. In this position, he was responsible for several large, residential projects. Due to his status within the ministry, he received little or no individual credit for his work.
