= Facing the Modern: The Portrait in Vienna 1900 =

Exhibition at the National Gallery, London

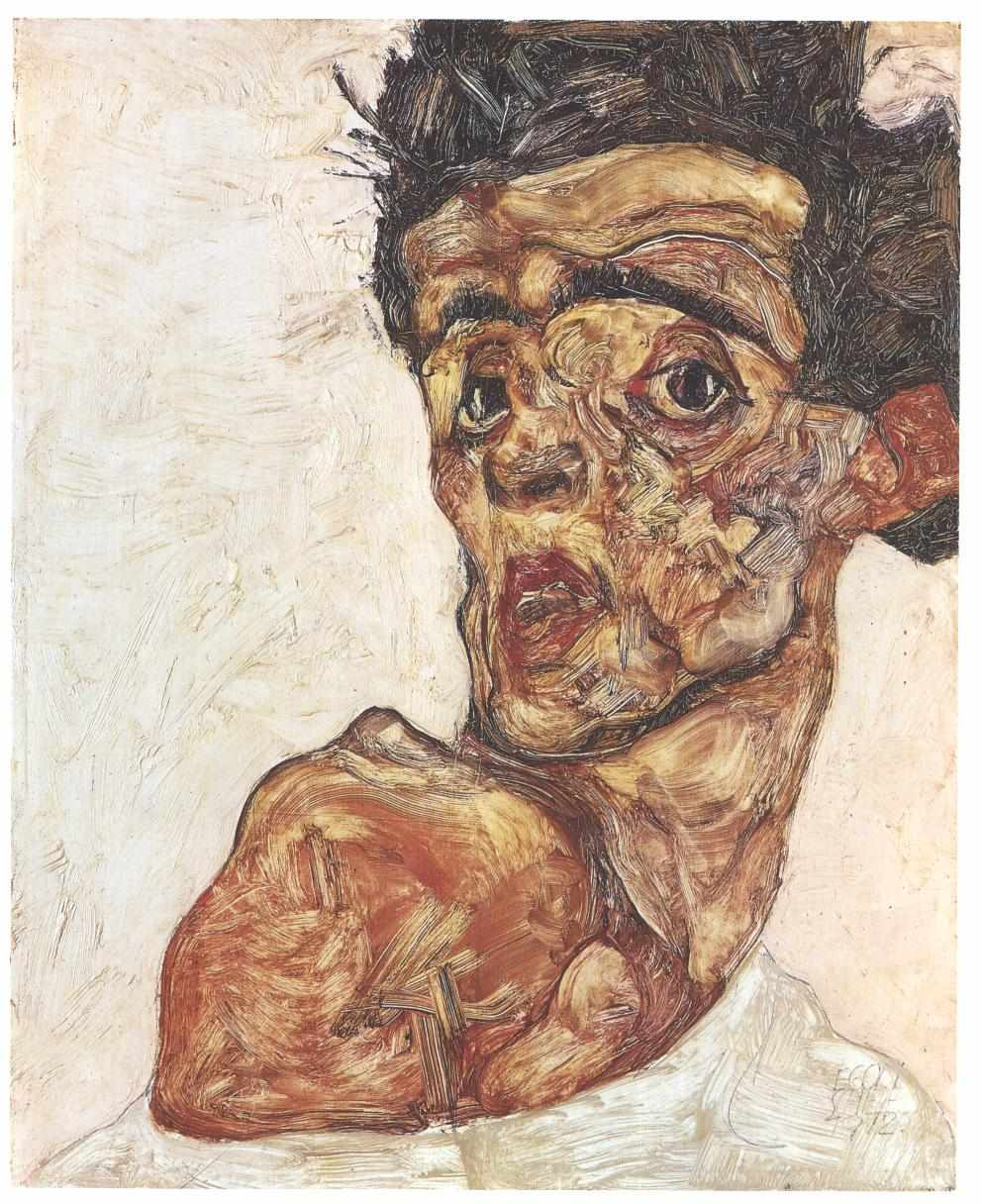
Egon Schiele: Self Portrait with Raised Bare Shoulder, 1912 (oil on wood, 42.2 cm × 33.9 cm), Leopold Museum Private Foundation, Vienna

Facing the Modern: The Portrait in Vienna 1900 was an exhibition at the National Gallery, London, running from 9 October 2013 through to 12 January 2014.

== Description ==
The exhibition was curated by Gemma Blackshaw and sponsored by Credit Suisse.

== Exhibition catalogue ==
The exhibition catalogue was entitled Facing the Modern: The Portrait in Vienna 1900. It is edited by Gemma Blackshaw and has an introduction by Edmund de Waal. Contributors are:

- Gemma Blackshaw (On Stage: The New Viennese; Past Times and Present Anxieties at the Galerie Miethke; Klimt, Schiele and Schonberg: Self Portraits).
- Tag Gronberg (Biedermeir Modern: representing Family Values).
- Doris H. Lehmann (Portraying Viennese Beauty: Makart and Klimt).
- Julie M. Johnson (Woman Artists and Portraiture in Vienna 1900).
- Elana Shapira (Imaging the Jew: A Clash of Civilisations).
- Sabine Wieber (A Beautiful Corpse: Vienna's Fascination with Death).

=== Introduction ===
Edmund de Waal is the author of The Hare with Amber Eyes, which tells the story of his family, the wealthy Jewish Ephrussi family, who settled in Vienna towards the end of the 19th century. One of the first things they did to establish themselves was to commission portraits. The exhibition catalogue explores the way in which portraiture in Vienna was intertwined with patronage, politics and the creation of taste. Included in the exhibition (exhibit no. 73) is an Ephrussi family photograph album, dating from about 1904, depicting members of the family in tableaux vivants.

=== On stage: the new Viennese ===
Gustav Klimt's Auditorium in the Old Burgtheater contains one hundred and thirty-one minutely realised portraits of the upper echelons of Viennese society at the time, and as such has been characterised as a portrait of the late 19th century. But it also an image of the emerging middle classes that most defined that century. The catalogue takes as its subject this new class, the Neu-Wiener (New Viennese), and retells the story of the modern portrait as its story.

=== Past times and present anxieties at the Galerie Miethke ===
The Galerie Miethke was one of Vienna's most progressive galleries. Yet in 1905 it devoted an exhibition to portraits of the early nineteenth century, the Alt-Wiener (Old Viennese), reflecting the anxieties of the age in seeking comfort from the past. Neu-Wiener (New Viennese) portraits such as Anton Romako's Portrait of Isabella Reisser reflect a new psychologism.

=== Biedermeier modern: representing family values ===
Tag Gronberg surveys the portrayal of family values over an extended 19th century ranging from the early 1800s to the First World War. In Fin-de-siècle Vienna it was still possible to see nostalgic portrayals of family life in the Biedermeier tradition of the first half of the century. But in the age of Freud such depictions of harmonious domesticity no longer went unchallenged and by 1918 portraits such as Egon Schiele's The Family posed stark challenges to the viewer.

=== Portraying Viennese beauty: Makart and Klimt ===
Hans Makart was the dominant portraitist in the Ringstrasse period (1857–1914). His portraits were primarily of young women from the upper middle classes and the lower ranks of the nobility, an upwardly mobile group of patrons anxious to legitimise their status in a rigidly hierarchical and traditional monarchical system. By Gustav Klimt's time, ideals of beauty had changed. Klimt incorporated design principles in his portraits that he had developed in his other works. In his later work the application of color increased dramatically, in response to the advent of Fauvism.

=== Klimt, Schiele, and Schönberg: Self Portraits ===
Gustav Klimt completed just one self-portrait during his 40-year career, declaring himself uninterested in himself as a subject for a painting. Egon Schiele on the other hand portrayed himself frequently, using his body as a medium of expression, approaching it as just another material to be manipulated. Schönberg was an untrained artist, "in many ways the archetypal artist-genius" in the Romantic tradition of the anxious and alienated artist, as represented in self-portraits by Friedrich von Amerling, Franz Eybl, and the young Rudolf von Alt.

=== Woman Artists and Portraiture in Vienna 1900 ===
Julie M. Johnson discusses the lives and work of Broncia Koller-Pinell, Elena Luksch-Makowsky, and Teresa Ries. Woman artists in Fin-de-siècle Vienna, many of whom were Jewish, laboured under misogyny and restrictions, but nevertheless were able to pursue careers as public artists, to sustain studios, and to mount spectacular exhibitions.

=== Imaging the Jew: a clash of civilisations ===
Elana Shapira examines the portraiture of Gustav Klimt, Oskar Kokoschka, Richard Gerstl, and Arnold Schoenberg. In portraying their Jewish sitters, Klimt and Kokoschka sought to create a shared cultural platform between Jews and Christians while Gerstl and Schönberg sought to expose the problems behind that artistic aim.

=== A Beautiful Corpse: Vienna's Fascination with Death ===
Fin-de-siècle Vienna's fascination with death and dying may have been the result of a deep-rooted cultural pessimism, but it had positive affirmation as well in its tradition of a schöne Leiche, or beautiful corpse. When Gustav Klimt was called upon to paint a deathbed portrait of Ria Munk, a suicide scandalously involved with the novelist Hanns Heinz Ewers, he first portrayed her as a sleeping beauty. Her mother Aranka rejected this, as well as a subsequent version portraying her as a bare-breasted exotic dancer, leading Klimt to his celebrated, unfinished, Posthumous Portrait of Ria Munk III. The painting was seized by the Nazis and eventually restituted to the heirs of Aranka Munk in 2009, fetching £18,801,250 at auction in 2010.

=== Illustrative works ===
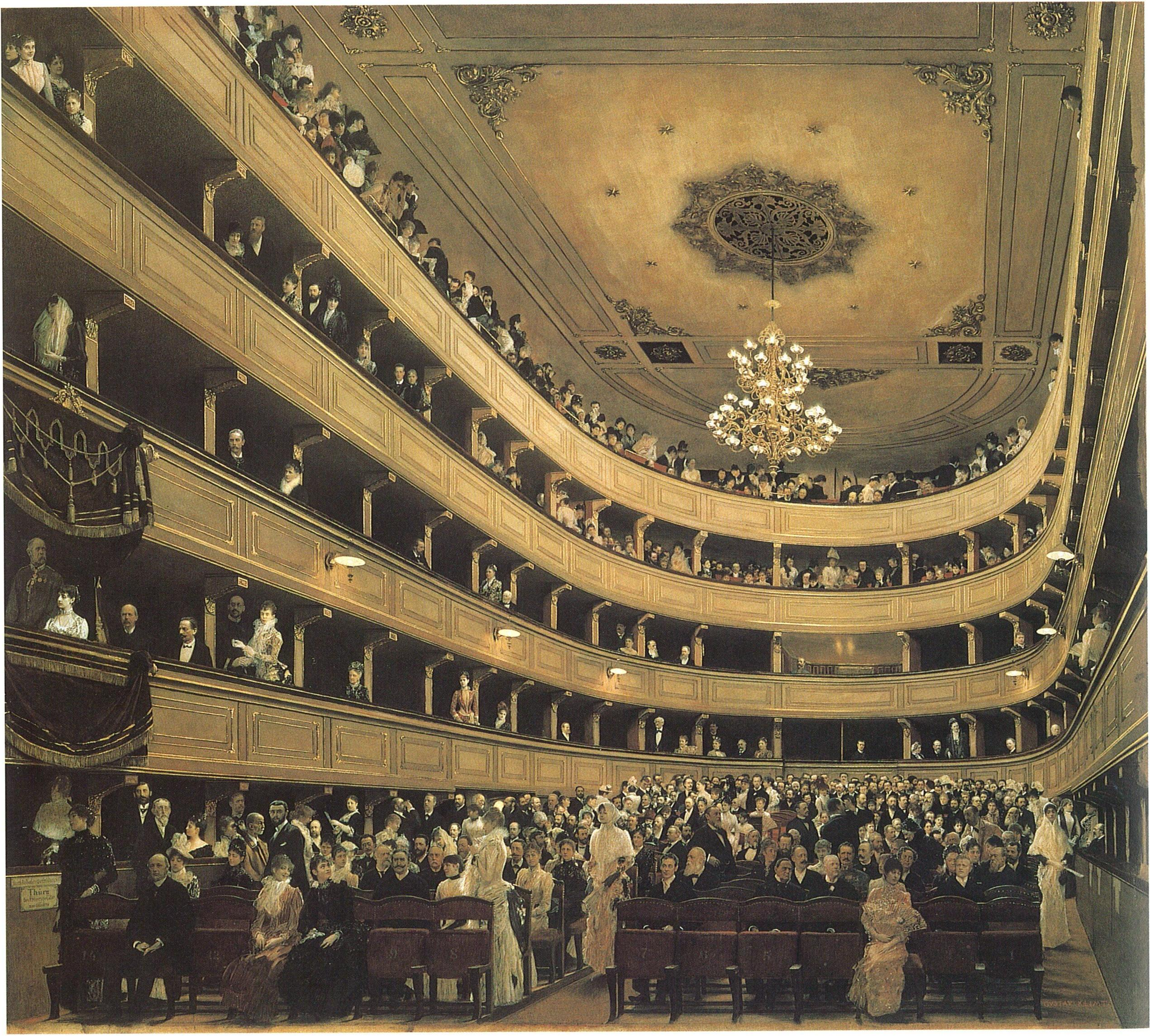
Gustav Klimt: Auditorium in the Old Burgtheater, 1888–9 (not in exhibition).

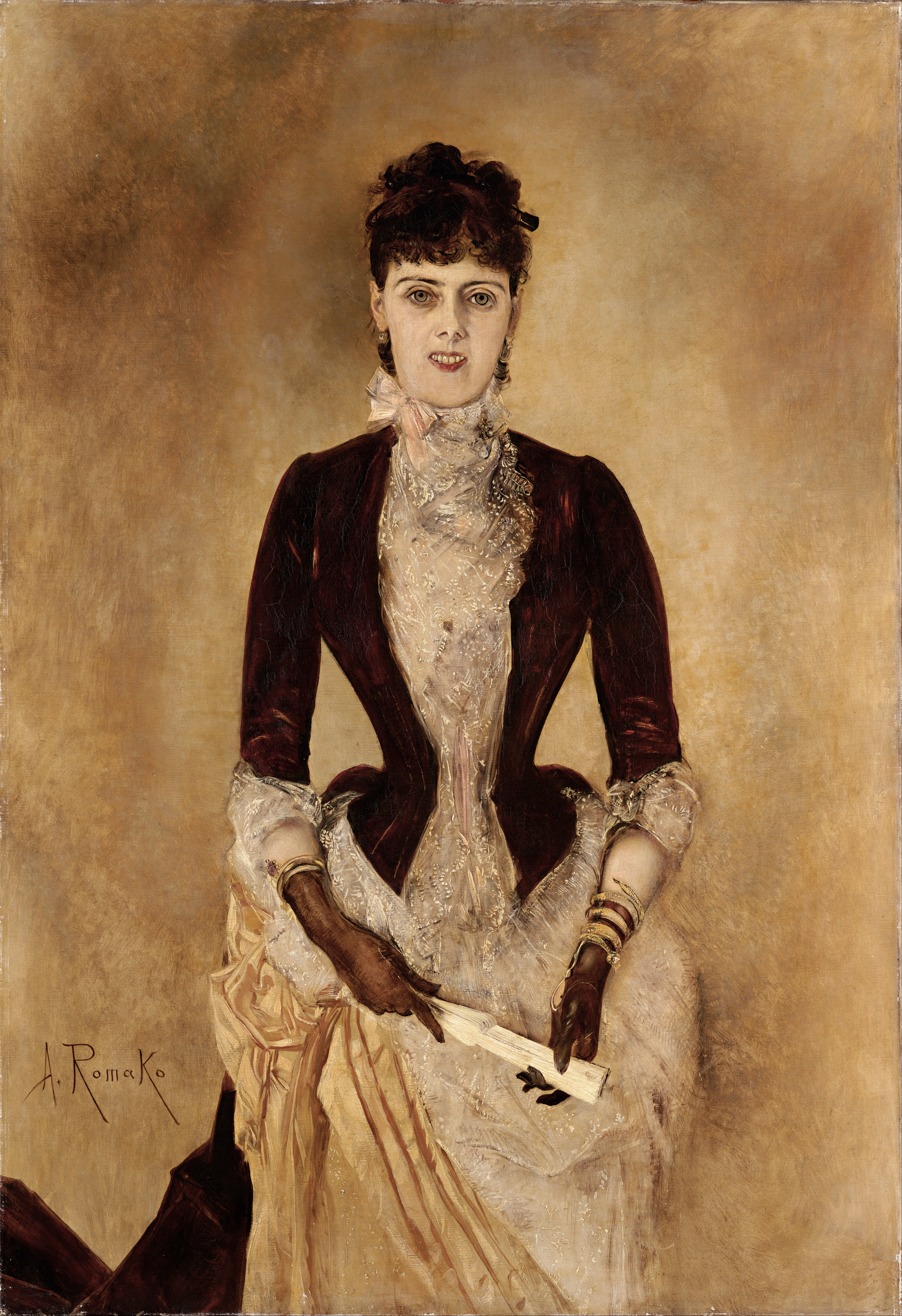
Anton Romako: Portrait of Isabella Reisser, 1885.

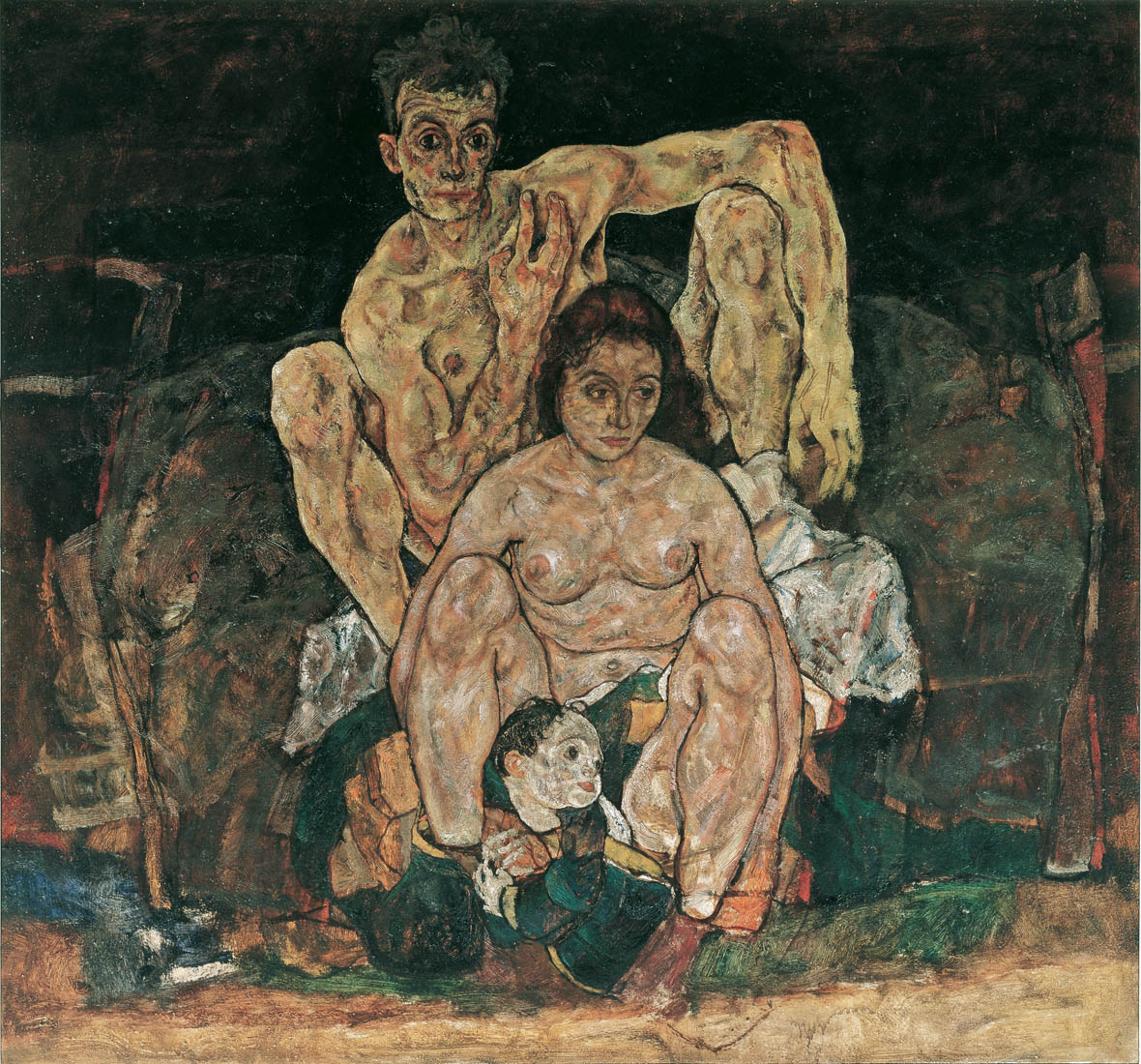
Egon Schiele: The Family, 1918.

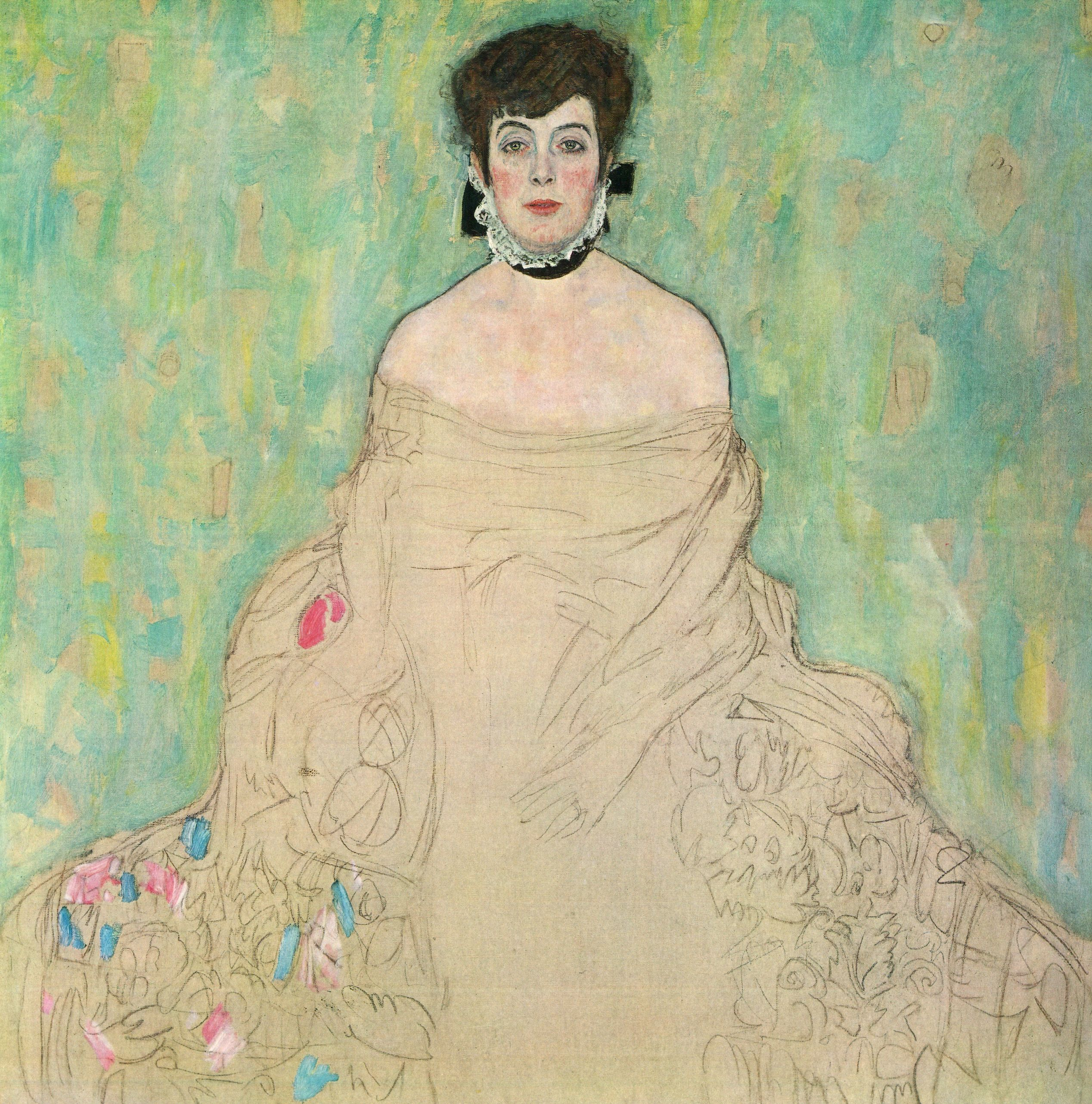
Gustav Klimt: Portrait of Amalie Zuckerlandl (unfinished), 1917–18

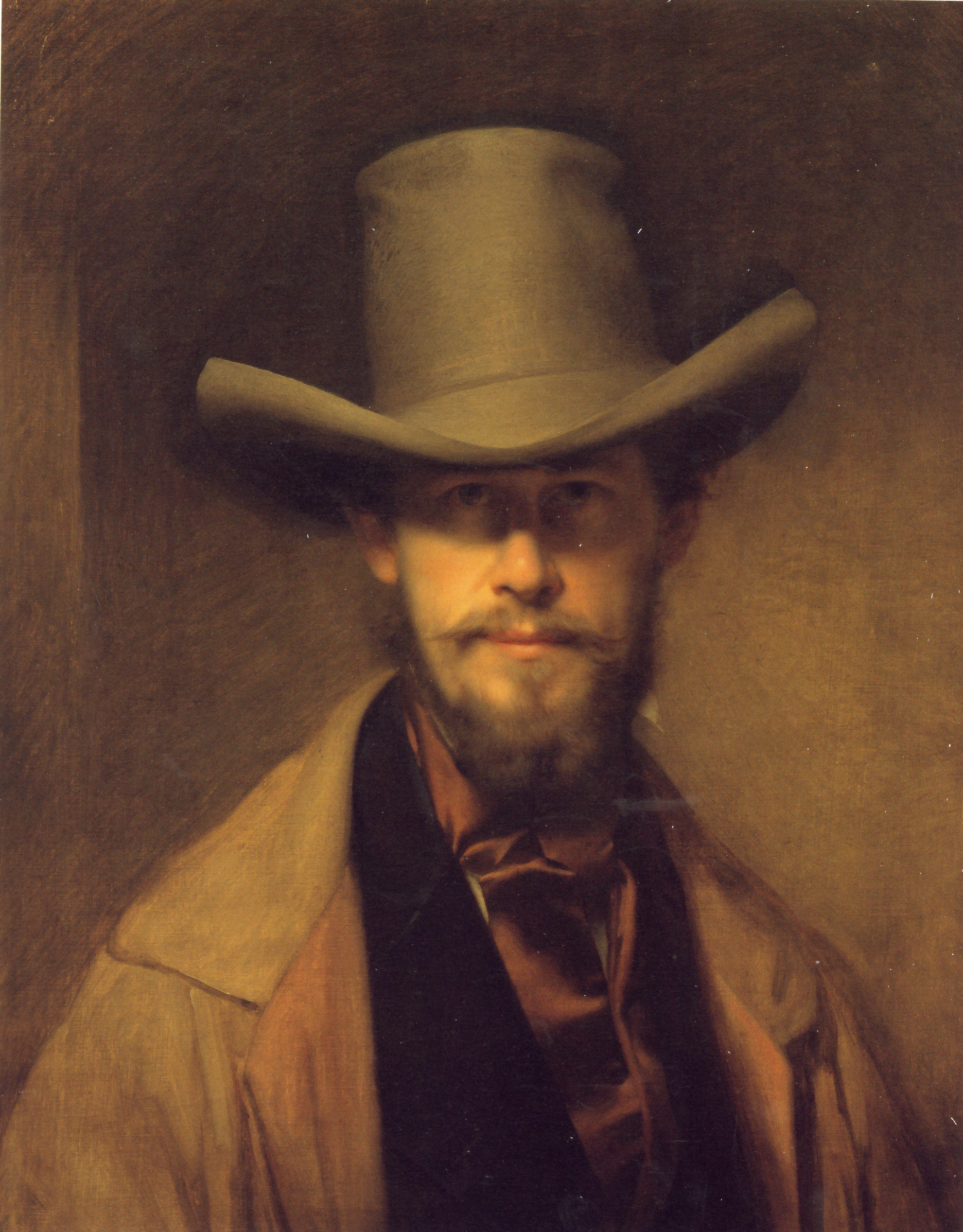
Franz Eybl: Self Portrait, about 1840.

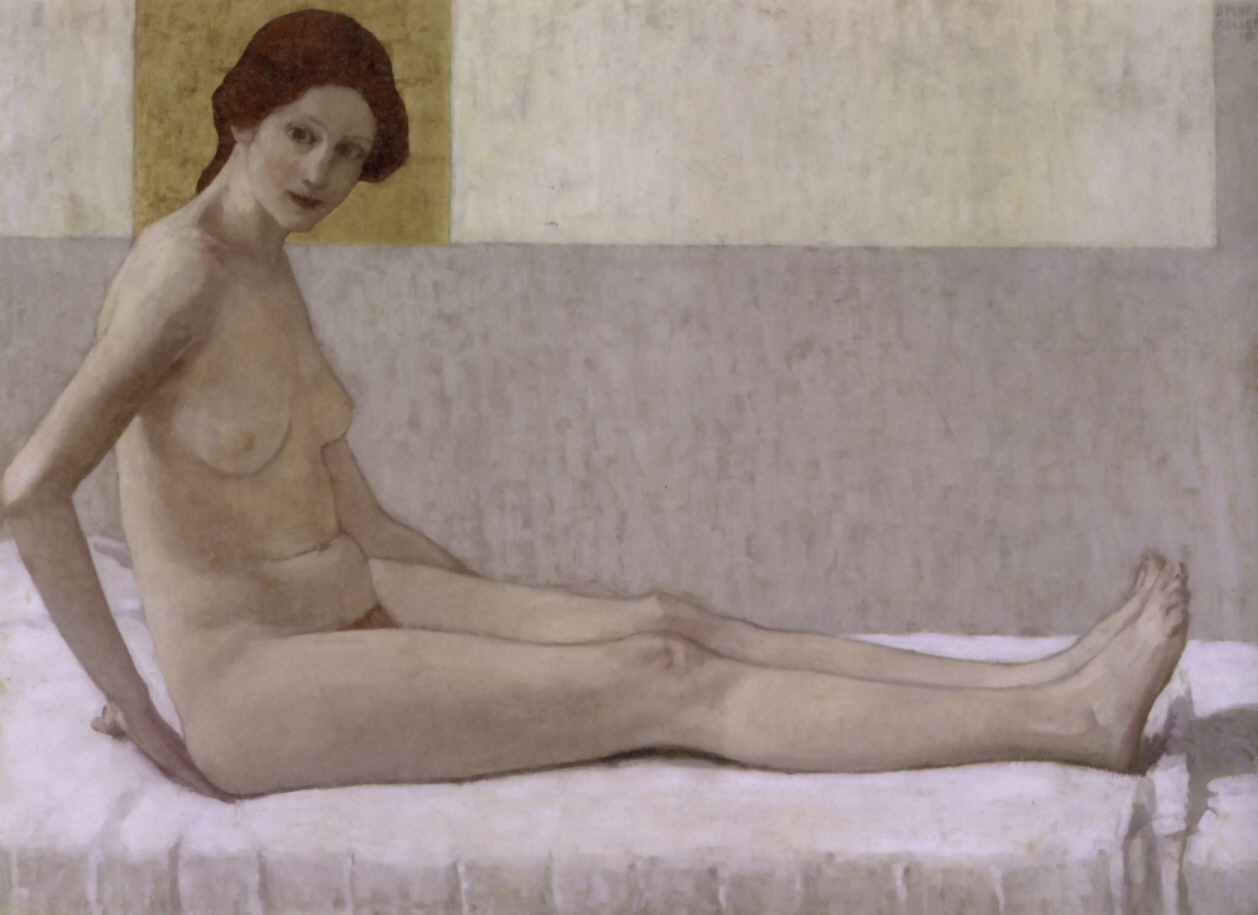
Broncia Koller-Pinell: Nude Portrait of Marietta, 1907.

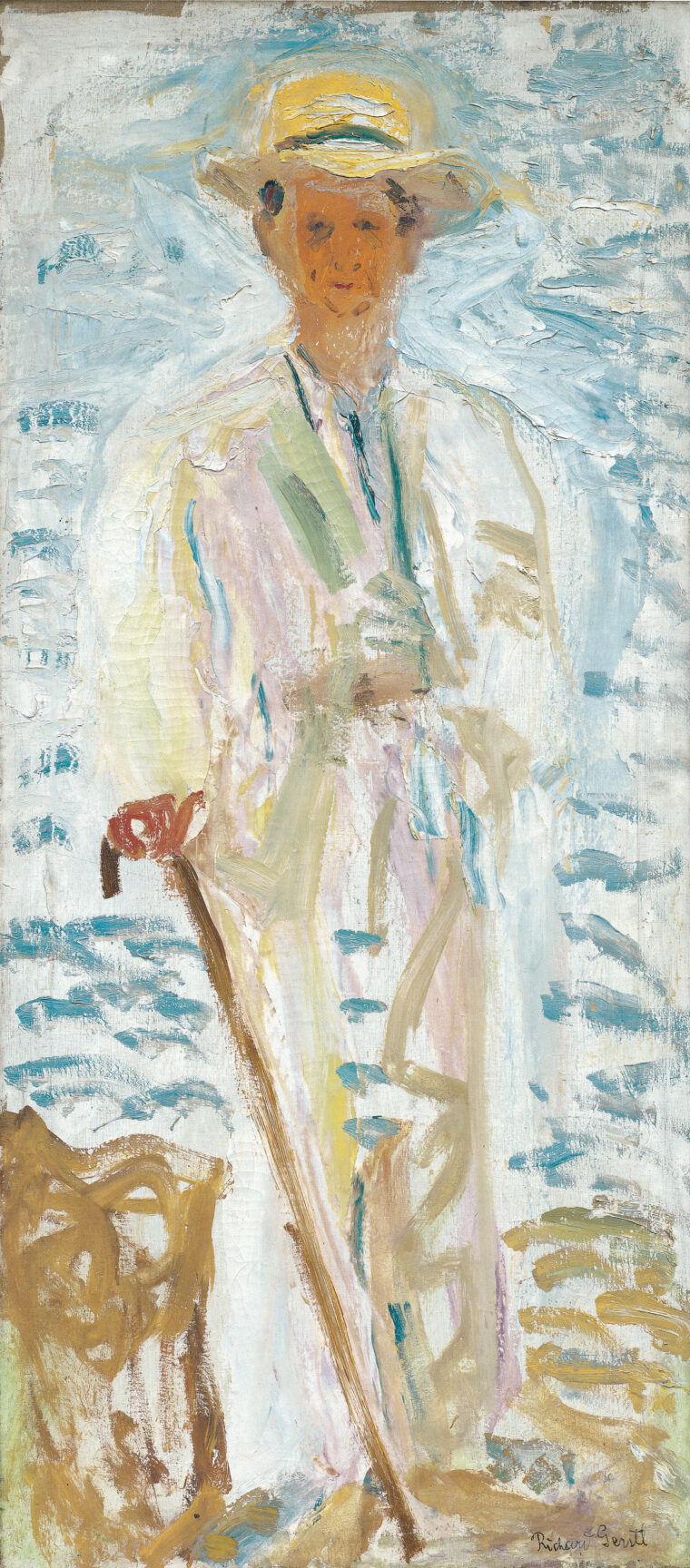
Richard Gerstl: Portrait of Alexander Zemlinsky, 1908.

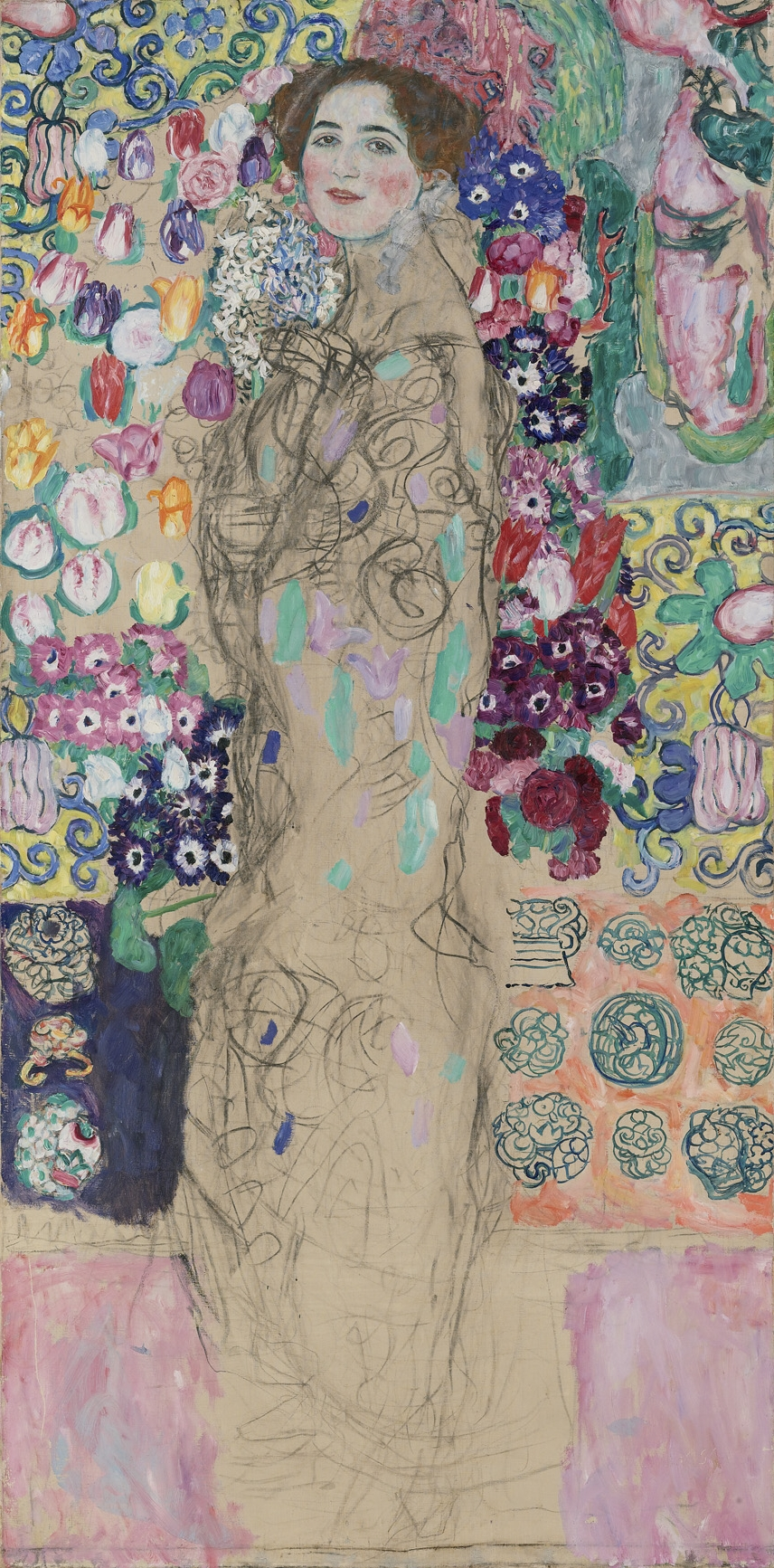
Gustav Klimt: Posthumous Portrait of Ria Munk III, 1917–18.

== List of artists exhibited ==
Works from the following artist are exhibited:

Name	Representative work	Year & Title	Biographical note
Alt, Rudolf von (1812–1905)		1883 – Self Portrait (pencil and watercolour, 35.5 cm × 25.5 cm), Albertina, Vienna	Rudolf Ritter von Alt was an Austrian landscape and architectural painter. He received official commissions from Archduke Ferdinand until 1848, when Alt was obliged to flee the city temporarily because of political unrest. He was ennobled in 1889. In 1897 he was made the Honorary President of the Vienna Secession.
Amerling, Friedrich von (1803–1887)		1832: Portrait of Franz I, emperor of Austria (detail) (oil), Schönbrunn (n.b. a study for this portrait is exhibited, not the portrait itself).	Friedrich von Amerling was an Austro-Hungarian portrait painter in the court of Franz Josef. He was born in Vienna and was court painter between 1835 and 1880. With Ferdinand Georg Waldmüller he is one of the outstanding Austrian portrait painters of the 19th century. He was ennobled by Franz I's successor, Franz Joseph, in 1878.
Auchentaller, Josef Maria (1865–1949)		Bunte Bände (Portrait of Maria) (oil on canvas, 120 cm × 110.5 cm), 1912, Archivio Auchentaller, Italy.	Josef Maria Auchentaller was an Austrian painter, draftsman, and printmaker associated with the Vienna Secession and the Art Nouveau style. From 1901 he became increasingly detached from the group and moved to the Italian resort of Grado, where he contributed significantly to the development of the tourist industry of the Adriatic resort. His poster Seebad : Grado remains one of the most significant and famous examples of Jugendstil (i.e. Art Nouveau).
Benczúr, Gyula (1844–1920)		1899: Portrait of Empress Elisabeth (oil on canvas, 142 cm × 95.5 cm), Hungarian National Museum, Budapest.	Gyula Benczúr was a Hungarian painter and teacher. He won international success with his first few paintings, winning several competitions. He was commissioned by the Bavarian king Ludwig II to paint Rococo themes. Benczúr was later a favorite among the Hungarian upper-class, painting numerous portraits of kings and aristocrats. He was considered a rival in historical painting to Hans Makart.
Canon, Hans (1829–1855)		1876: Girl with Parrot (oil on canvas, 126 cm × 84.6 cm), Belvedere, Vienna.	Hans Canon was an Austrian Academist painter, born in Vienna. He became an officer of cuirassiers in the Austrian army. Subsequently, after gaining some success with pictures executed largely under the influence of Carl Rah, he traveled extensively in England, France, Italy, and the Orient before settling in Vienna as Professor at the Academy of Fine Arts. He was considered one of the finest portrait painters of his time.
Danhauser, Josef (1805–1845)		1827: Beethoven on his Deathbed (lithograph), Cobble Collection Trust (not in exhibition).	Josef Danhauser was an Austrian painter, one of the main artists of Biedermeier period together with Ferdinand Georg Waldmüller and Peter Fendi amongst others. His works, not very appreciated in his day, dealt with very moralising subjects and were clearly influenced by William Hogarth. With Matthias Ranftl he made Ludwig van Beethoven's death mask as well as making an oil painting of Beethoven's hands, both featured in the exhibition.
Delug, Alois (1859–1930)		1900: Mayor Karl Lueger with Chain, Austrian National Library (not in exhibition)	Alois Delug was an Austrian painter and professor at the Vienna Academy of Fine Arts. He joined the Secession as it was being founded. His students included Broncia Koller and Anton Kolig. Claims that it was he who twice denied Adolf Hitler admission to drawing classes at the academy derive from Josef Greiner, a fraudulent and discredited biographer of Hitler, and have no otherwise independent sources.
Eybl, Franz (1806–1880)		1883: The Artist Franz Wipplinger looking at a Portrait of his Late Sister (oil on canvas, 126 cm × 100 cm), Belvedere, Vienna.	Franz Eybl was an Austrian painter. By the age of ten, he had already entered the Academy of Fine Arts in Vienna, studying under Josef Klieber and Josef Mössmer. Later he studied under Johann Peter Krafft, as did his contemporary Josef Danhauser. He is most appreciated for his portraits of the middle classes.
Feuerbach, Anselm (1829–1880)		1878: Self Portrait (not the version exhibited)	Anselm Feuerbach was the son of the well-known archaeologist Joseph Anselm Feuerbach. After passing through the art schools of Düsseldorf and Munich he travelled across Europe, painting in Paris, Karlsruhe, Vienna, and Rome. In 1873, he became professor in the Academy of Fine Arts in Vienna. Feuerbach developed a disagreement with architect Theophil Hansen over his ceiling mural The Fall of the Titans, meant for the Great Hall of the new academy building on the Ringstrasse. This led to his resigning his post after only three years. He went to live in Venice, where he died in 1880.
Gerstl, Richard (1883–1908)		1908: Nude Self Portrait with Palette (oil on canvas, 139.3 cm × 100 cm), Leopold Museum Private Foundation, Vienna	Richard Gerstl was an Austrian painter and draftsman known for his expressive psychologically insightful portraits, his lack of critical acclaim during his lifetime, and his affair with the wife of Arnold Schoenberg, which led to his suicide. He trained at the Academy of Fine Arts in Vienna. Sixty-six paintings and eight drawings attributed to Gerstl are known.
Gütersloh, Albert Paris von (1887–1973)		1914: Portrait of a Woman (oil on canvas, 54.6 cm × 38.5 cm), Leopold Museum Private Foundation, Vienna	Albert Paris Gütersloh was an Austrian painter and writer. Gütersloh worked as actor, director, and stage designer before he focused on painting in 1921. He was debarred from teaching at Vienna's School of Applied Arts by the Nazis. After the war he took up a professorship at Vienna's Academy of Fine Arts. As a teacher of Arik Brauer, Ernst Fuchs, Wolfgang Hutter, Rudolf Hausner, and Anton Lehmden he is considered one of the biggest influences on the Vienna School of Fantastic Realism.
Kaufmann, Isidor (1854–1921)		About 1910: Young Rabbi from N. (oil on wood, 38.1 cm × 27.6 cm), Tate, London	Isidor Kaufmann was an Austro-Hungarian painter of Jewish themes. In 1875, he went to the Landes-Zeichenschule in Budapest, where he remained for one year. In 1876, he left for Vienna but was refused admission to the Academy of Fine Arts. He became a pupil of the portrait painter Joseph Matthäus Aigner. He traveled throughout Eastern Europe in search of scenes of Jewish, often Hasidic life.
Klimt, Gustav (1862–1918)		1894: Young Girl, Seated (oil on wood, 14 cm × 9.6 cm), Leopold Museum Private Foundation, Vienna	Gustav Klimt was an Austrian symbolist painter and one of the most prominent members of the Vienna Secession movement. Klimt is noted for his paintings, murals, sketches, and other objets d'art. Klimt's primary subject was the female body; his works are marked by a frank eroticism. Klimt was a founding member of the Vienna Secession. In 1897 he became its first president.
Kokoschka, Oskar (1886–1980)		1909: Portrait of Lotte Franzos (oil on canvas, 114.9 cm × 79.4 cm), The Phillips Collection, Washington, D.C.	Oskar Kokoschka was an Austrian artist, poet and playwright best known for his intense expressionistic portraits and landscapes. He studied in Vienna at the School of Applied Arts. Early exhibitions provoked critical outrage. From 1910 to 1914 he concentrated mainly on portraiture, depicting his sitters in a nervous animated manner, dividing his time between Vienna and Berlin. He later lived in Dresden, Parague and the United Kingdom (where he made many sketches in colour pencil of the countryside around Ullapool in Scotland). He eventually settled in Montreux, Switzerland.
Kolig, Anton (1886–1950)		1911: Portrait of the Schaukal Family (Oil on canvas,160 cm × 160 cm), Leopold Collection II, Vienna	Anton Kolig was an Austrian expressionist painter. Born in Moravia, he relocated to Vienna to study first at the School of Applied Arts and then the Academy of Fine Arts. He worked as a war artist in Vienna during the First World War and then moved to Nötsch im Gailtal in Austria, where he co-founded the Nötsch School with Franz Wiegele and others. The fresco he executed for the Michor family tomb in Nötsch dates from 1929.
Koller, Broncia (1863–1934)		1907: Portrait of Anna Mahler (oil on canvas, 95 cm × 80 cm), Leopold Museum, Vienna (not in exhibition)	Broncia Koller (née Pinell) was born in Galicia to an orthodox Jewish family. She studied under Josef Raab and Alois Delug in Vienna, eventually forming a close association with Gustav Klimt and his circle. One of her two children was the conductor Rupert Koller, who was briefly married to the sculptor Anna Mahler (then just sixteen years old), a daughter of Gustav Mahler and a subject for Broncia Koller.
Luksch-Makowsky, Elena (1878–1967)		1910: Self Portrait with her son Peter (oil on canvas, 94.5 cm × 52 cm)	Elena Luksch-Makowsky was a Russian born painter, sculptor and graphic artist. She studied first in St. Petersburg and then in Munich, where she met and married the Austrian sculptor Richard Luksch. The couple moved to Vienna, where they quickly became involved with the Secession and the Wiener Werkstätte. In 1907 they moved to Hamburg following Richard Luksch's appointment as a professor at the Academy of Applied Arts, where Luksch-Makowsky spent the rest of her life. She left behind a large body of work which rarely sees the sale-room.
Makart, Hans (1840–1884)		about 1878: Portrait of Clothilde Beer (oil on canvas, 135.3 cm × 95.6 cm)	Hans Makart was a 19th-century Austrian academic history painter, designer, and decorator; most well known for his influence on Gustav Klimt and other Austrian artists, but in his own era considered an important artist himself and was a celebrity figure in the high culture of Vienna, attended with almost cult-like adulation. Summoned by Emperor Franz Joseph to Vienna in 1867, he received court commissions for large-scale works, establishing himself thereafter as a portrait painter for patrons drawn especially from the fashionable Ringstrassenzeit Vienna society.
Matsch, Franz von (1861–1942)		1916: Emperor Franz Joseph on his Deathbed (oil on card, 51.5 cm × 69.5 cm)	Franz von Matsch was an Austrian painter and sculptor in the Jugendstil style. He studied with Gustav and Ernst Klimt at the School of Applied Arts in Vienna, the three of them going on to form the "Artists' Company", receiving numerous commissions by 1880. Matsch later broke with Klimt following the scandal surrounding Klimt's 1901 University paintings, subsequently teaching at the School of Applied Arts. He was ennobled in 1912.
Moll, Carl (1861–1945)		1906: Self Portrait in his Study (oil on canvas, 100 cm × 100 cm), Gemäldegalerie der Akademie der bildenden Künste Wien, Vienna	Carl Moll was a prominent Art Nouveau painter active in Vienna at the start of the 20th century. He studied art at the Academy of Fine Arts Vienna. He was a student of Christian Griepenkerl and of Emil Jakob Schindler (the father of Alma Mahler-Werfel). After his teacher's death (1892), Moll married Schindler's widow, Anna, thus becoming step-father to Gustav Mahler's wife. In 1897 he co-founded the Vienna Secession with Gustav Klimt, leaving it with Klimt in 1905, although continuing to support it as a director of the Miethke Gallery until 1912. He organised the first exhibition of Vincent van Gogh's work in Vienna (the second painting above the sideboard in his 1906 self-portrait is Van Gogh's Portrait of the Artist's Mother, while the sculpture is by George Minne). Despite his close connection with the Mahler family, Moll was an anti-semite and a Nazi sympathiser. He committed suicide at the end of the Second World War as the Russians were entering Vienna.
Müller, Leopold Carl (1834–1892)		By 1892: Head of a Girl (oil on canvas, 40 cm × 30 cm), private collection (not in exhibition)	Leopold Carl Müller was an Austrian genre painter. He studied at the Vienna Academy of Fine Arts where he later taught. He travelled extensively in Italy, Hungary, and Egypt, and kept studios in both Vienna and Cairo . He is noted for his oriental subjects and is regarded as the founder of the Austrian school of Orientalist painting. His An Almée's Admirers (Egyptische Tänzerin) realised $1,650,500 at a 2008 sale .
Oppenheimer, Max (1885–1954)		1910: Portrait of Heinrich Mann (oil on canvas, 91 cm × 81 cm)	Max Oppenheimer trained at the Vienna Academy of Fine Arts and then at the Prague Academy. He joined the group of Viennese expressionists centred around Oskar Kokoschka and Egon Schiele, but his portrait of Heinrich Mann was considered a plagiarism of Kokoschka's 'psychological portrait' style and he was excluded from the group. He moved to Berlin and then to Switzerland in 1915. Here the representation of music became his key theme and he went on to paint, over a very long period of time between 1935 and 1952 (as a Jewish refugee in New York), a celebrated picture of Gustav Mahler conducting the Vienna Philharmonic Orchestra performing his 4th symphony, a reprise of an earlier 1923 version.
Ries, Teresa Feodorowna (1874–1956)		1902: Self Portrait (oil on canvas, 157 cm × 70.5 cm)	Teresa Ries was a painter and sculptor who came from a wealthy Jewish family in Russia. She studied at the Moscow Academy before being dismissed for questioning the authority of a teacher. She moved to Vienna, where she became a private student of Edmund Heller. A life-size sculpture of a witch she exhibited in 1895 at the Künstlerhaus caught the Emperor's eye and launched her on a glittering career, with the use of a studio in the Lichenstein Palace. She was forced to abandon her studio (it was 'Aryanized'), and her life work, when the Nazis rose to power in 1938. She escaped to Lugano, Switzerland, in 1942. Much of her work is lost.
Romako, Anton (1832–1889)		1873: The Artist's Nieces, Elisabeth and Maja (oil on canvas, 93.2 cm × 79.6 cm)	Anton Romako studied at the Vienna Academy of Fine Arts and later in Munich. He travelled in Italy and Spain before settling in Rome, where he established himself as a portrait, genre and landscape painter patronised by the local colony of foreigners. His later works are characterised by a nervous expressionist style that greatly influenced the young Kokoschka. He failed to reestablish himself on his return to Vienna in 1876 and in the following year two of his daughters committed suicide. He never recovered from the shock and died in poverty in Baden.
Schiele, Egon (1890–1918)		1918: Portrait of Paris von Gütersloh (oil on canvas, 140 cm × 110.3 cm)	Egon Schiele was an Austrian painter noted for the intensity of his work and the many self-portraits he produced. He entered the Vienna Academy of Fine Arts at the age of 15 and became a protégé of Gustav Klimt, taking part in numerous national and international exhibitions. His use of teenage models brought him hostility, culminating in a brief prison sentence in 1912 for exhibiting erotic drawings in a place accessible to children. His wife Edith, six months pregnant, died of Spanish flu on 28 October 1918, he following her just three days later.
Schönberg, Arnold (1874–1951)		1910: Blue Self Portrait (oil on three-ply panel, 31.1 cm × 22.9 cm)	Arnold Schoenberg was an Austrian composer and painter, associated with the expressionist movement in German poetry and art, and leader of the Second Viennese School. An untrained painter, his pictures were nevertheless considered good enough to be exhibited alongside Franz Marc and Wassily Kandinsky as fellow members of the expressionist Blue Rider group. He took some lessons from Richard Gerstl, producing some 60 paintings and 200 drawings up to 1912, after which he largely abandoned visual art.
Waldmüller, Ferdinand Georg (1793–1865)		1839: Portrait of an Unidentified Seated Girl in a White Satin Dress (oil on canvas, 32 cm × 26.5 cm)	Ferdinand Georg Waldmüller was an Austrian painter and writer. He trained briefly at the Vienna Academy of Fine Arts before turning to painting miniatures to support himself, going on to establish a successful and lucrative portrait practice. He is noted for an 1823 portrait of Ludwig van Beethoven. He is also noted for his landscape, genre scenes and flower pieces, and is considered a leading member of the Biedermeier period. He was a staunch advocate of Realism in art, a position that eventually brought him into conflict with the Vienna Academy, where he was Professor from 1829.

== List of exhibited works ==
The following works are exhibited:

1. Gustav Klimt (1862–1918) Portrait of Hermine Gallia, 1904, oil on canvas, 170.5 × 96.5 cm, National Gallery, London (NG 6434).
2. Oskar Kokoschka (1886–1980), Portrait of Lotte Franzos, 1909, oil on canvas, 114.9 × 79.4 cm, The Phillips Collection, Washington, D.C. (1062).
3. Hans Canon (1829–1885) Girl with Parrot, 1876, oil on canvas, 126 × 84.6 cm, Belvedere, Vienna (5943).
4. Egon Schiele (1890–1918), Portrait of Erich Lederer, 1913, oil and gouache on canvas, 140 × 55.4 cm, Kunstmuseum, Basel (G 1986.16).
5. Oskar Kokoschka (1886–1980), Portrait of Hugo Schmidt, 1911, oil on canvas, 72.5 × 54 cm, private collection.
6. Oskar Kokoschka (1886–1980), Portrait of Max Schmidt, 1914, oil on canvas, 90 × 57.7 cm, Museo Thyssen-Bornemisza, Madrid (1982.29 (629)).
7. Oskar Kokoschka (1886–1980), Portrait of Carl Leo Schmidt, 1911, oil on canvas, 97.2 × 67.8 cm, Museo Thyssen-Bornemisza, Madrid (CTB.1998.27).
8. Friedrich von Amerling (1803–1887), Emperor Franz I of Austria, Study for the Official Portrait of 1832 1832, oil on canvas, 29.9 × 21.8 cm, Cartin Collection, USA.
9. Friedrich von Amerling (1803–1887), Portrait of Franz Xaver Stöber, 1837, oil on canvas, 41 × 33 cm, Liechtenstein. The Princely Collections (GE 2147).
10. Carl Moll (1861–1945), Self Portrait in his Study, 1906, oil on canvas, 100 × 100 cm, Gemäldegalerie der Akademie der bildenden Künste Wien, Vienna (GG-1338).
11. Ferdinand Georg Waldmüller (1793–1865), Portrait of Militia Company Commander Schaumberg and his Child, 1846, oil on oak, 31.8 × 26.2 cm, Gemäldegalerie der Akademie der bildenden Künste Wien, Vienna (GG-1155).
12. Ferdinand Georg Waldmüller (1793–1865), Portrait of Schaumberg's Wife, 1846, oil on oak, 31 × 25.6 cm, Gemäldegalerie der Akademie der bildenden Künste Wien, Vienna (GG-1156).
13. Leopold Carl Müller (1834–1892), Portrait of Victor Tilgner, about 1899, oil on canvas, 95 × 68 cm, Gemäldegalerie der Akademie der bildenden Künste Wien, Vienna (GG-1223).
14. Max Oppenheimer (1885–1954), Portrait of Heinrich Mann, 1910, oil on canvas, 91 × 81 cm, Wien Museum, Vienna (78913).
15. Anton Romako (1832–1889), Portrait of Isabella Reisser, 1885, oil on canvas, 130.5 × 90 cm, Leopold Museum Private Foundation, Vienna (LM 2116).
16. Anton Romako (1832–1889), Portrait of Christoph Reisser, 1885, oil on canvas, 130.5 × 90.5 cm, Leopold Museum Private Foundation, Vienna (LM 2117).
17. Richard Gerstl (1883–1908), Portrait of Lieutenant Alois Gerstl, 1907, oil on canvas, 153 × 130.2 cm, Leopold Museum Private Foundation, Vienna (LM 639).
18. Arnold Schoenberg (1874–1951), Portrait of Hugo Botstiber, before October 1910, oil on cardboard, 73 × 50 cm, private collection, Vienna.
19. Josef Maria Auchentaller (1865–1949), Bunte Bände (Portrait of Maria), 1912, oil on canvas, 120 × 110.5 cm, Archivio Auchentaller, Italy.
20. Ferdinand Georg Waldmüller (1793–1865), Portrait of an Unidentified Seated Girl in a White Satin Dress, oil on canvas, 32 × 26.5 cm, 1839, Wien Museum, Vienna.
21. Gustav Klimt (1862–1918), Young Girl, Seated, 1894, oil on wood, 14 × 9.6 cm, Leopold Museum Private Foundation, Vienna (LM 4146).
22. Josef Maria Auchentaller (1865–1949), Portrait of Maria, oil on canvas, 30.5 × 25.5 cm, 1896, Archivio Auchentaller, Italy.
23. Anton Romako (1832–1889), The Artist's Nieces, Elisabeth and Maja, 1873, oil on canvas, 93.2 × 79.6 cm, Belvedere, Vienna (8557).
24. Richard Gerstl (1883–1908), The Sisters Karoline and Pauline Fey, 1905, oil on canvas, 175 × 150 cm, Belvedere, Vienna (4430).
25. Alois Delug (1859–1930), The Markl Family, 1907, oil on canvas, 113.5 × 138 cm, Belvedere, Vienna (1425).
26. Anton Kolig (1886–1950), Portrait of the Schaukal Family, 1911, oil on canvas, 160 × 160 cm, Leopold Collection II.
27. Egon Schiele (1890–1918), The Family (Self Portrait), oil on canvas, 150 × 160.8 cm, 1918, Belvedere, Vienna (4277).
28. Hans Makart (1840–1884), Portrait of Hanna Klinkosch, about 1875, oil on wood, 114 × 77 cm, Austrian collection.
29. Hans Makart (1840–1884), Portrait of Clothilde Beer, about 1878, oil on canvas, 135.3 × 95.6 cm, Salzburg Museum (365–42).
30. Gustav Klimt (1862–1918), Portrait of a Lady in Black, about 1894, oil on canvas, 155 × 75 cm, private collection.
31. Gustav Klimt (1862–1918), Study for the Portrait of Amalie Zuckerlandl, 1913–14, pencil on paper, 56.9 × 37.5 cm, Albertina, Vienna (30249).
32. Gustav Klimt (1862–1918), Study for the Portrait of Amalie Zuckerlandl, 1913–14, pencil on paper, 56.9 × 37.5 cm, private collection.
33. Gustav Klimt (1862–1918), Portrait of Amalie Zuckerlandl, 1917–18, oil on canvas, 128 × 128 cm, Belvedere, Vienna (7700).
34. Albert Paris von Gütersloh (1887–1973), Portrait of a Woman, 1914, oil on canvas, 54.6 × 38.5 cm, Leopald Museum Private Foundation (LM 81)
35. Anselm Feuerbach (1829–1880), Self Portrait with Cigarette, 1875, oil on canvas, 66 × 52.5 cm, Staatsgalerie Stuttgart L900.
36. Egon Schiele (1890–1918), Self Portrait with Raised Bare Shoulder, 1912, oil on wood, 42.2 × 33.9 cm, Leopald Museum Private Foundation (LM 653)
37. Egon Schiele (1890–1918), Portrait of Albert Paris von Gütersloh, 1918, oil on canvas, 140 × 110.3 cm, Minneapolis Institute of Arts (54.30).
38. Friedrich von Amerling (1803–1887), Self Portrait, 1867, oil on oak, 82 × 62 cm, Gemäldegalerie der Akademie der bildenden Künste Wien, Vienna (GG-945).
39. Arnold Schoenberg (1874–1951), Blue Self Portrait, 1910, oil on canvas, 31.1 × 22.9 cm, Schönberg Center, Vienna (CR 11).
40. Franz Eybl (1806–1880), Self Portrait, about 1840, oil on canvas, 70 × 55.5 cm, Gemäldegalerie der Akademie der bildenden Künste Wien, Vienna (GG-1149).
41. Rudolf von Alt (1812–1905), Self Portrait, about 1835, watercolor, 18.3 × 13.3 cm, Gemäldegalerie der Akademie der bildenden Künste Wien, Vienna (116761/2).
42. Rudolf von Alt (1812–1905), Self Portrait, 1883, pencil and watercolor, 35.5 × 25.5 cm, Albertina, Vienna (30999)
43. Arnold Schoenberg (1874–1951), Portrait of Marietta Werndorff, before October 1910, oil on board, 99.7 × 71 cm, Schönberg Center, Vienna (CR 88).
44. Arnold Schoenberg (1874–1951), Portrait of Georg Schönberg, February 1910, oil on three-ply panel, 50 × 47 cm, Schönberg Center, Vienna (CR 98).
45. Broncia Koller (1863–1934), Nude Portrait of Marietta, 1907, oil on canvas, 107.5 × 148.5 cm, Eisenberger Collection, Vienna.
46. Broncia Koller (1863–1934), Silvia Koller with a Birdcage, 1907–8, oil on canvas, 100 × 100 cm, Eisenberger Collection, Vienna.
47. Oskar Kokoschka (1886–1980), Children Playing, 1909, oil on canvas, 72 × 108 cm, Lehmbruck Museum, Duisburg (573/1965).
48. Teresa Ries (1874–1956), Self Portrait, 1902, oil on canvas, 157 × 70.5 cm, Wien Museum, Vienna (133781).
49. Richard Gerstl (1883–1908), Nude Self Portrait with Palette, 1908, oil on canvas, 139.3 × 100 cm, Leopold Museum Private Foundation, Vienna (LM 651).
50. Elena Luksch-Makowsky (1878–1967), Self Portrait with her Son Peter, 1901, oil on canvas, 94.5 × 52 cm, Belvedere, Vienna (7455).
51. Friedrich von Amerling (1803–1887), Portrait of Cäcilie Freiin von Eskeles, 1832, oil on canvas, 151.5 × 102 cm, Germanisches Nationalmuseum, Nuremberg (GM 913).
52. Isidor Kaufmann (1854–1921), Young Rabbi from N., about 1910, oil on wood, 38.1 × 27.6 cm, Tate, London (N04464).
53. Oskar Kokoschka (1886–1980), Count Verona, 1910, oil on canvas, 70.6 × 58.7 cm, private collection, Hong Kong.
54. Oskar Kokoschka (1886–1980), Portrait of Peter Altenberg, 1909, oil on canvas, 76.2 × 71.1 cm, private collection.
55. Oskar Kokoschka (1886–1980), Portrait of Hanz Tietze and Erica Tietze-Conrat, 1909, oil on canvas, 76.5 × 136.2 cm, The Museum of Modern Art, New York (651.1939).
56. Richard Gerstl (1883–1908), Portrait of Alexander Zemlinsky, 1908, oil on canvas, 170.5 × 74.3 cm, Kamm Collection (K.G. 78a) REVERSE Fragment of a Full-length Self Portrait, about 1904, oil on canvas, 170.5 × 74.3 cm, Kamm Collection (K.G. 78b).
57. Richard Gerstl (1883–1908), Portrait of Mathilde Schönberg in the Studio, after February 1908, oil on canvas, 171 × 60 cm, Kamm Collection (K.G. 77).
58. Franz von Matsch (1861–1942), Emperor Franz Joseph on his Deathbed, 1916, oil on card, 51.5 × 69.5 cm, Belvedere, Vienna (3300).
59. Franz Eybl (1806–1880), The Artist Franz Wipplinger, looking at a Portrait of his Late Sister, 1833, oil on canvas,126 × 100 cm, Belvedere, Vienna (1869).
60. Friedrich von Amerling (1803–1887), Antonie von Amerling on her Deathbed, 1843, oil on canvas, 47 × 39 cm, Wien Museum, Vienna.
61. Gyula Benczúr (1844–1920), Portrait of Empress Elisabeth, 1899, oil on canvas, 142 × 95 cm, Hungarian National Museum, Budapest (1861).
62. Gustav Klimt (1862–1918), Ria Munk on her Deathbed, 1912, oil on canvas, 50 × 50.5 cm, private collection.
63. Gustav Klimt (1862–1918), Posthumous Portrait of Ria Munk III, 1917–18, oil on canvas, 180.7 × 89.8 cm, private collection.
64. Egon Schiele (1890–1918), Portrait of Edith Schiele, dying, 28 October 1918, Black chalk on paper, 44 × 29.5 cm, Leopold Museum, Vienna (LM 2382).
65. Otto Zimmermann, 1902, photographed by Studio S. Fleck, photograph, 10.2 × 16.5 cm, Diethard Leopold Collection, Vienna.
66. Gustav Klimt (1862–1918), Portrait of the Artist's Dead Son, Otto Zimmermann, 1902, chalk on paper, 39.5 × 24.7 cm, Diethard Leopold Collection, Vienna.
67. Moriz Schroth (dates unknown), Death Mask of Gustav Klimt, 1918, plaster, 27 × 21 × 18 cm, Wien Museum, Vienna (43945).
68. Unknown artist, Death Mask of Egon Schiele, 1918, plaster, 19.5 × 15.5 cm, Wien Museum, Vienna (95170).
69. Josef Humplik (1888–1958), Death Mask of Adolf Loos, 1933, plaster, 24 × 18.5 × 17 cm, Wien Museum, Vienna (78988).
70. Carl Moll (1861–1945), Death Mask of Gustav Mahler, 1911, plaster, 35 × 29 × 16 cm, Wien Museum, Vienna (78658/b).
71. Josef Danhauser (1805–1845) and Matthias Ranftl (1804–1854), Death Mask of Beethoven, 1827, plaster, 25 × 17 × 15 cm, Wien Museum, Vienna (95323).
72. Josef Danhauser (1805–1845), Beethoven's Hands, 1827, oil on canvas, 10.2 × 16.5 cm, Beethoven-Haus, Bonn, Collection H.C. Bodmer (B 952).
73. Unknown, Emmy von Ephrussi's photograph album, about 1904, book open 24 × 34 cm, Edmund de Waal.

== Reviews ==
Praise was generally somewhat muted. Reviewers welcomed the opportunity to view paintings by Schiele and Klimt, rarely seen in the UK, but expressed dismay at the way the exhibition was hung, that the order of works was not chronological, and over the paucity of information about the works and their sitters. Richard Dorment for The Daily Telegraph thought the show more of an illustrated lecture than an exhibition, while Jackie Wullschlager of The Financial Times called it a "heartbreaking missed opportunity". Adrian Searle of The Guardian thought the exhibition both "dizzying and depressing" but not an exhibition about great portraiture, as much about Vienna itself as its portraitists and sitters. His colleague Laura Cumming complained the show was frustratingly chaotic and observed it was most alive when depicting death. Brian Sewell of The Evening Standard shared concerns over the way the exhibition was organised, nevertheless welcomed the opportunity to view some lesser known names, although trenchant in his dismissal of Arnold Schoenberg's work: "The most unwise of these excursions is the exaltation as artist-genius, even comparing him with Van Gogh, of the composer Arnold Schoenberg, 26 and penniless in 1900, his crass amateur paintings "untainted" by training, deliberately naive – a folly equalled only by our acceptance, a century later, of Paul McCartney as a painter".

Rachel Campbell-Johnston for The Times (paywall), in a positive review, called the exhibition a complicated, probing, and philosophically fascinating show, exposing a society darkly sinister. Her colleague Nancy Durrant reviews Vienna itself, concluding (as did Adrian Searle) with Klimt's unfinished Portrait of Amalie Zuckerkandl:

Finally, and most poignantly, there is Klimt's 1918 portrait of Amalie Zuckerkandl, unfinished at his death. By this time, the war nearly over, the Empire was on its knees. Sittings for the picture, commissioned by the industrialist Ferdinand Bloch-Bauer, of whose family Zuckerkandl was a close friend, were difficult. Zuckerkandl was away, working in a hospital on the front line with her doctor husband. Even taking into account its unfinished state, this bold, almost severe work betrays the bleak uncertainty facing both sitter and artist.

Klimt died that same year. Zuckerkandl's story is harsher. A Christian who had converted to Judaism in order to marry Herr Zuckerkandl, she and her husband divorced after the First World War. The association was enough for the Nazis however – she and her children were deported to a concentration camp during the Second World War, where she was murdered. Cruelly cut off, her portrait serves as a beautiful, terrible closing testament to a time of both great cultural flowering and its ultimate decay.

— Nancy Durrant, The Times, 5 October 2013

== See also ==
- Biedermeier
- Vienna Secession
- Ver Sacrum
- Wiener Werkstätte
- Miethke Gallery
- Austrian Association of Women Artists
- Ringstraße

== Bibliography ==
- Blackshaw, Gemma, ed. (2013). Facing the Modern: The Portrait in Vienna 1900. National Gallery Company Limited. ISBN 978-1857095616. LCCN 2013941700.
- Johnston, Julie (2012). The Memory Factory: The Forgotten Women Artists of Vienna 1900. Purdue University Press. ISBN 978-1557536136.
- Schorske, Carl E (1980). Fin-de-siècle Vienna. Vintage. ISBN 978-0-394-74478-0. LCCN 80011043.
