= Josef Maria Auchentaller =

Austrian artist (1865–1949)

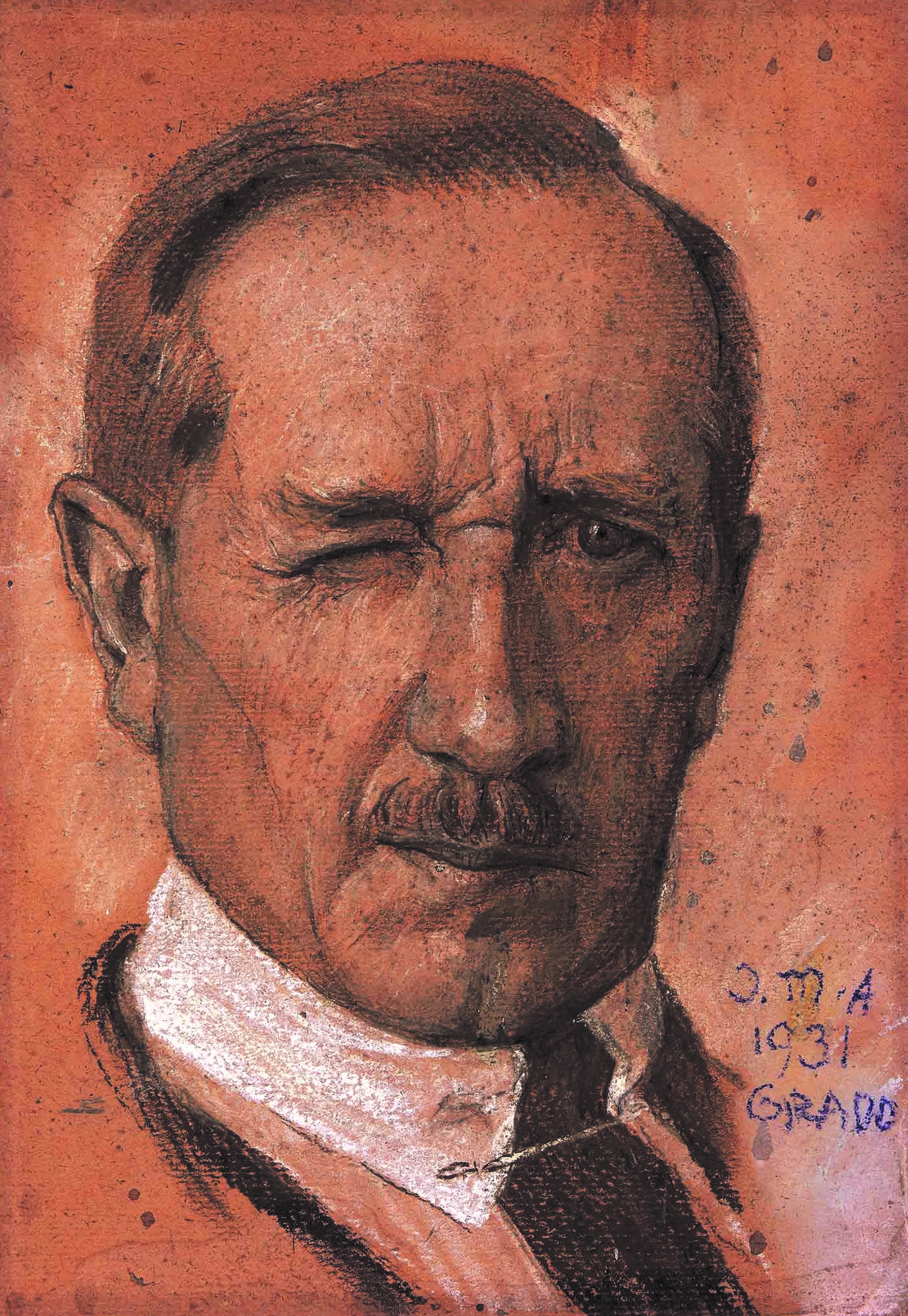
- Josef Maria Auchentaller self-portrait (1931)
- Born: August 2, 1865; Vienna, Austrian Empire
- Died: December 31, 1949 (aged 84); Grado, Friuli-Venezia Giulia, Italy
- Occupation: Architect
- Practice: Painter, draftsman, and printmaker

Josef Maria Auchentaller (2 August 1865 – 31 December 1949) was an Austrian painter, draftsman, and printmaker associated with the Vienna Secession and the Art Nouveau style.

== Early life ==
Josef Auchentaller attended the Technical College in Vienna from 1882 to 1886. He attended the Academy of Fine Arts Vienna starting in 1890, and there he excelled and won several awards. In 1885, he fell in love with Emma Scheid, the daughter of a prosperous manufacturer of silverware and jewelry. The couple married in 1891 after her father was convinced of Auchentaller's social and financial suitability. They had a daughter, Maria Josepha, and a son, Peter.

== Career ==
Beginning in 1895, he contributed Art Nouveau designs for his father-in-law's company, G.A. Scheid. From 1892 to 1896, the Auchentallers lived in Munich, where he studied under Paul Hoecker, a founder of the 1892 Munich Secession. Auchentaller contributed to Jugend, the German Secession review established in 1896.

=== Vienna Secession ===
In 1897, the Vienna Secession was formed by artists who had left the Association of Austrian Artists. The Auchentallers returned from a vacation in Italy to take part. Between 1898 and 1904, Auchentaller showed his work in 10 Secessionist shows. Auchentaller designed the poster and the catalog covers for the Seventh (1900) and Fourteenth (1902) exhibitions. He also played a role in the Secession's organizing committee from the Fifth to the Tenth Exhibition (1899–1901). In 1905, he left the Secession along with Gustav Klimt due to differences of artistic opinion.

Auchentaller was a contributor to the magazine Ver Sacrum, a Secessionist publication, and sat on its editorial board between 1900 and 1901. For this magazine, he contributed two title pages and many graphics. His work consisted primarily of floral motifs and linear drawings influenced by Japanese woodcuts which were the popular during that time (see Japonisme). The eighth issue of Ver Sacrum was entirely devoted to Auchentaller.

His family connections to the Scheids and Thonets continued to provide him with further work. For Georg Adam Scheid's company, G.A.S. Silver Jewelry Manufacturers, the artist designed jewelry heavily influenced by the Art Nouveau and Jugendstil movements. Auchentaller also produced numerous billboards and posters for companies including Aureol (1898), Schott and Donnath, Kath Reiners Kneipp barley (1899), Continental pneumatic (1900), International Fisheries Exhibition, and G.A.S. Silver Jewelry Manufacturers (1902).

=== Grado, Italy ===
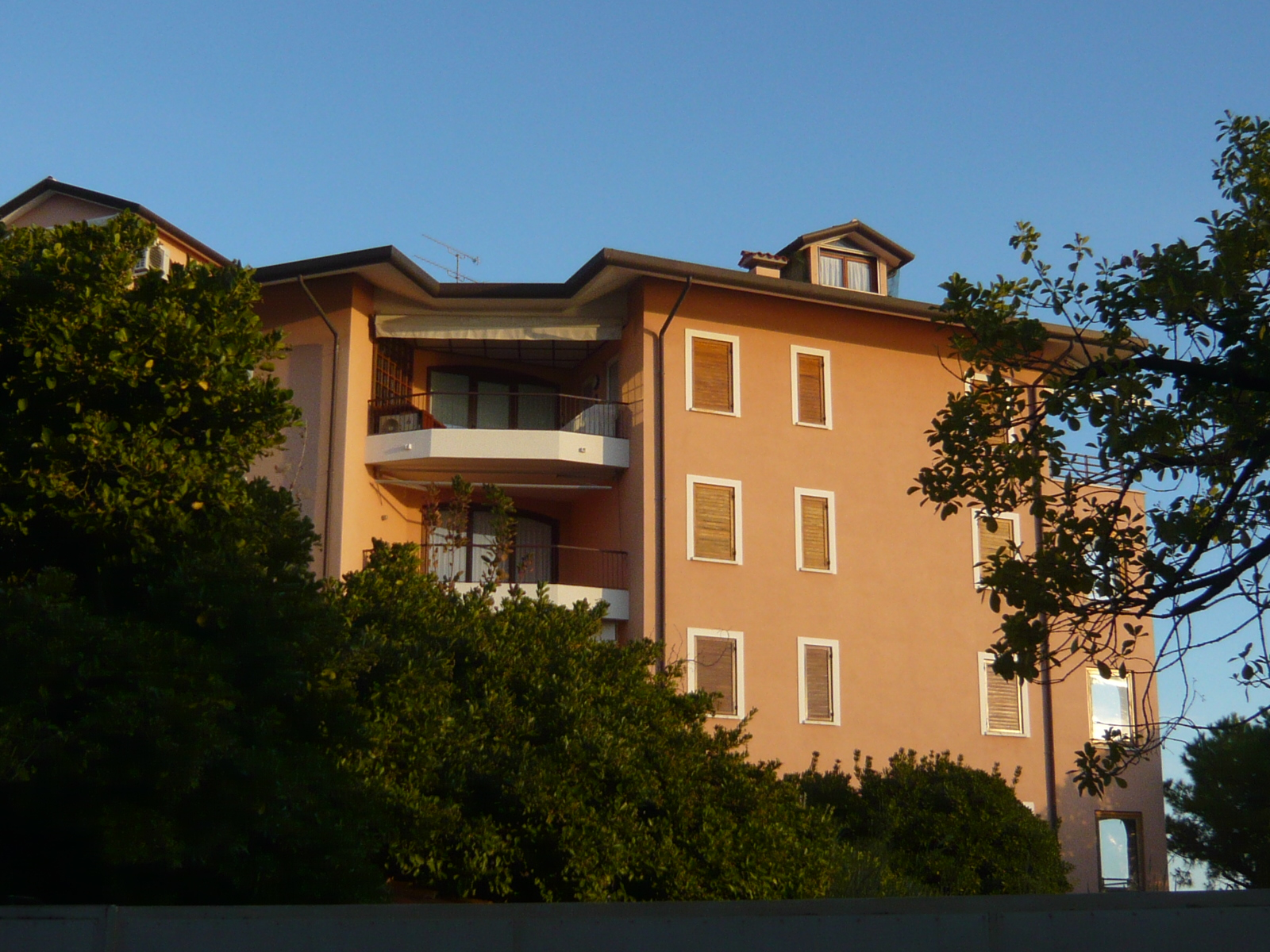
Pension Fortino in Grado, 2009

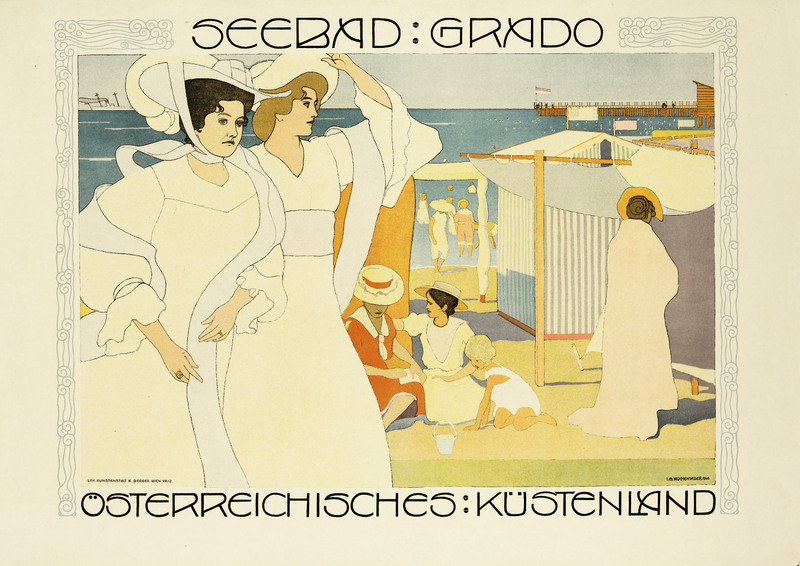
Advertisement poster Seebad Grado

In 1903, he moved with his wife and children to Grado, Italy, seeking a better climate and financial stability. From 1904, the Auchentallers spent every summer in Grado, where they contributed significantly to the growth of tourism in the Adriatic seaside resort town. He provided ornamentation for a new pensione, the "Pension Fortino", designed by the architect Julius Mayreder. His wife, Emma, later installed a steam laundry and bought an island where fruit and vegetables were grown for the town. Grado soon became a popular holiday destination of the Viennese bourgeoisie and for Auchentaller's circle of artist friends, including Carl Moll, Alfred Roller, Wilhelm List, Max Kurzweil, and the architect Otto Wagner. In 1906, Auchentaller designed the advertisement poster Seebad Grado, which endures as one of his most famous Art Nouveau works.

Although he spent winters in Vienna, Auchentaller became increasingly isolated from the Austrian art world after leaving the Secession in 1905. Increasingly, he began to paint moody landscapes and portraits. His family life became strained: his daughter, Maria Josepha, committed suicide in 1914, and there were rumors that his wife was involved with another man in Grado. In 1914, war was declared and the Auchentellers moved back to Austria. In 1919, the Auchentallers took Italian citizenship and moved to Grado for good. Emma died in 1945, and Auchentaller died four years later in 1949.

== Legacy ==
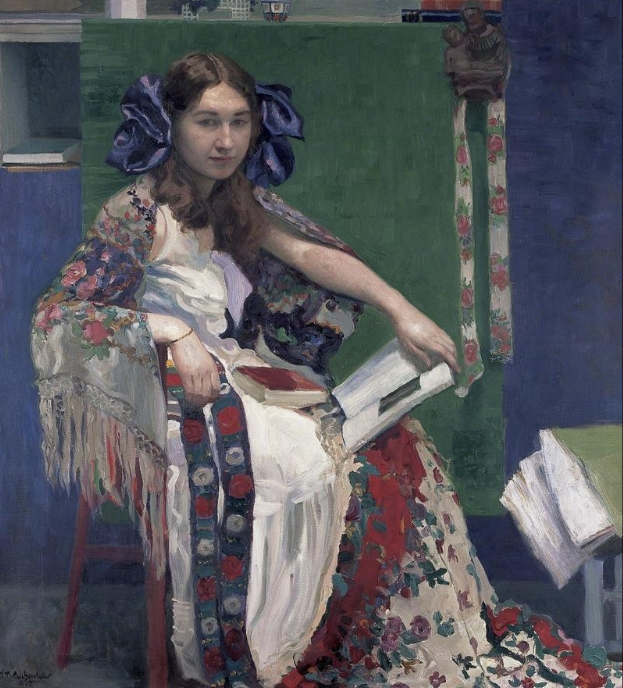
Bunte Bänder (Portrait of Maria) (oil on canvas, 120 cm × 110.5 cm), 1912, Archivio Auchentaller, Italy

Auchentaller was a substantial contributor to the Vienna Secession and the Art Nouveau style. However, many of Auchentaller's works remain in private collections or were lost. In 1920s, a sizeable collection of his oil paintings bound for a retrospective in Argentina disappeared. A large frieze he painted entitled "Joy, Fair Spark of the Gods", created for the Belvedere Gallery in Vienna, is lost as well.

In 2008–2009, a traveling exhibition entitled "Josef Maria Auchentaller (1865-1949): A Secessionist on the Borders of the Empire" was curated by Roberto Festi. Over 300 of his works were displayed at the Palazzo Attems-Petzenstein, in the Musei provinciali of Gorizia, Italy; the Galleria Civica in Bolzano, Italy; and the Leopold Museum in Vienna, Austria.

In 2013 two portraits of his daughter Maria, including Bunte Bänder ('colourful ribbons'), were shown at the National Gallery, London exhibition Facing the Modern: The Portrait in Vienna 1900.
