= Anton Kolig =

Austrian painter (1886–1950)

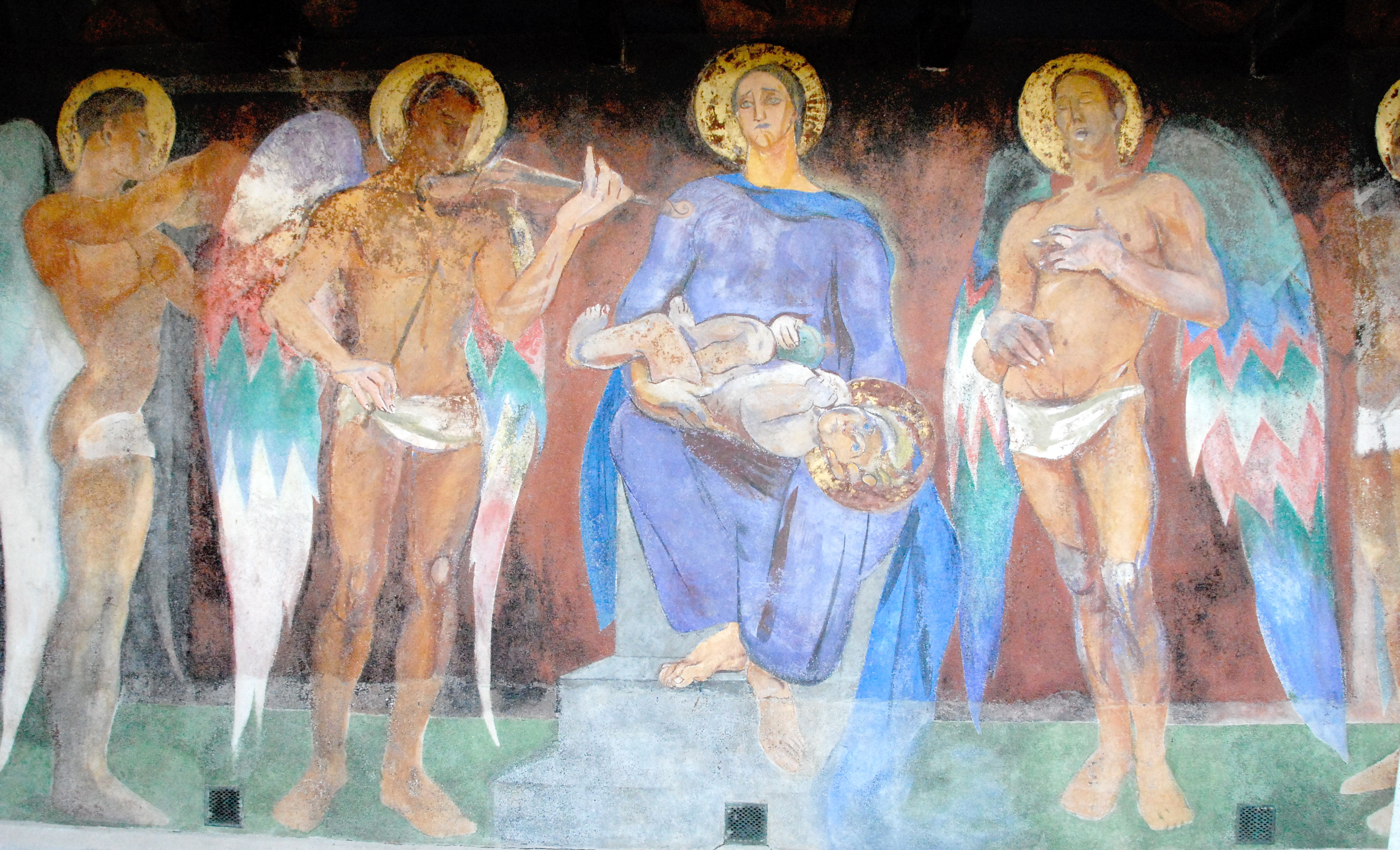
Madonna with Child (1927–1929), fresco, Nötsch im Gailtal, Carinthia

Anton Kolig (1 July 1886 – 17 May 1950) was an Austrian expressionist painter.

== Biography ==
Anton Kolig was born in Neutitschein as the son of salon artist Ferdinant Kolig. He studied at the Vienna School of Arts and Crafts with Oscar Kokoschka in 1904–1907, then from 1907 he continued his studies at the Academy of Fine Arts in Vienna under the guidance of Heinrich Lefler and Alois Delug.

In 1911, the work presented by him at the exhibition attracted the attention of specialists who awarded Kolig a scholarship and organized a trip to France. After the outbreak of war, he returned to Austria.

During the First World War, starting in 1916, he was in military service, and worked as a military artist in Vienna.

Kolig was a teacher, a professor in at the State Academy of Fine Arts Stuttgart, from 1928 to 1943. In 1944, he was seriously injured as a result of Allied bombing in World War II. He spent the last years of his life in Nötsch im Gailtal, where he died on 17 May 1950.

Anton Kolig is considered the most important representative of Austrian colour expressionism. He created a total of approximately 3,000 drawings, 62 colour works on paper and 390 oil paintings, many of which have been lost. Due to his homoerotic tendencies, he often focused on the male nude, but also created portraits and still lifes. Many of his works also reflect Kolig's religiousness.

== See also ==
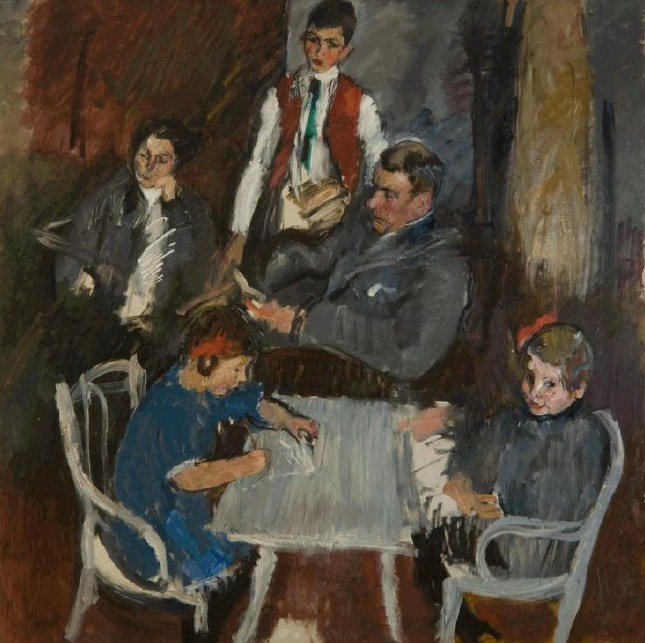
Portrait of the Schaukal Family, 1911, oil on canvas, 160 cm × 160 cm, Leopold Collection II, Vienna

- Facing the Modern: The Portrait in Vienna 1900
