= Elena Luksch-Makowsky =

Russian painter

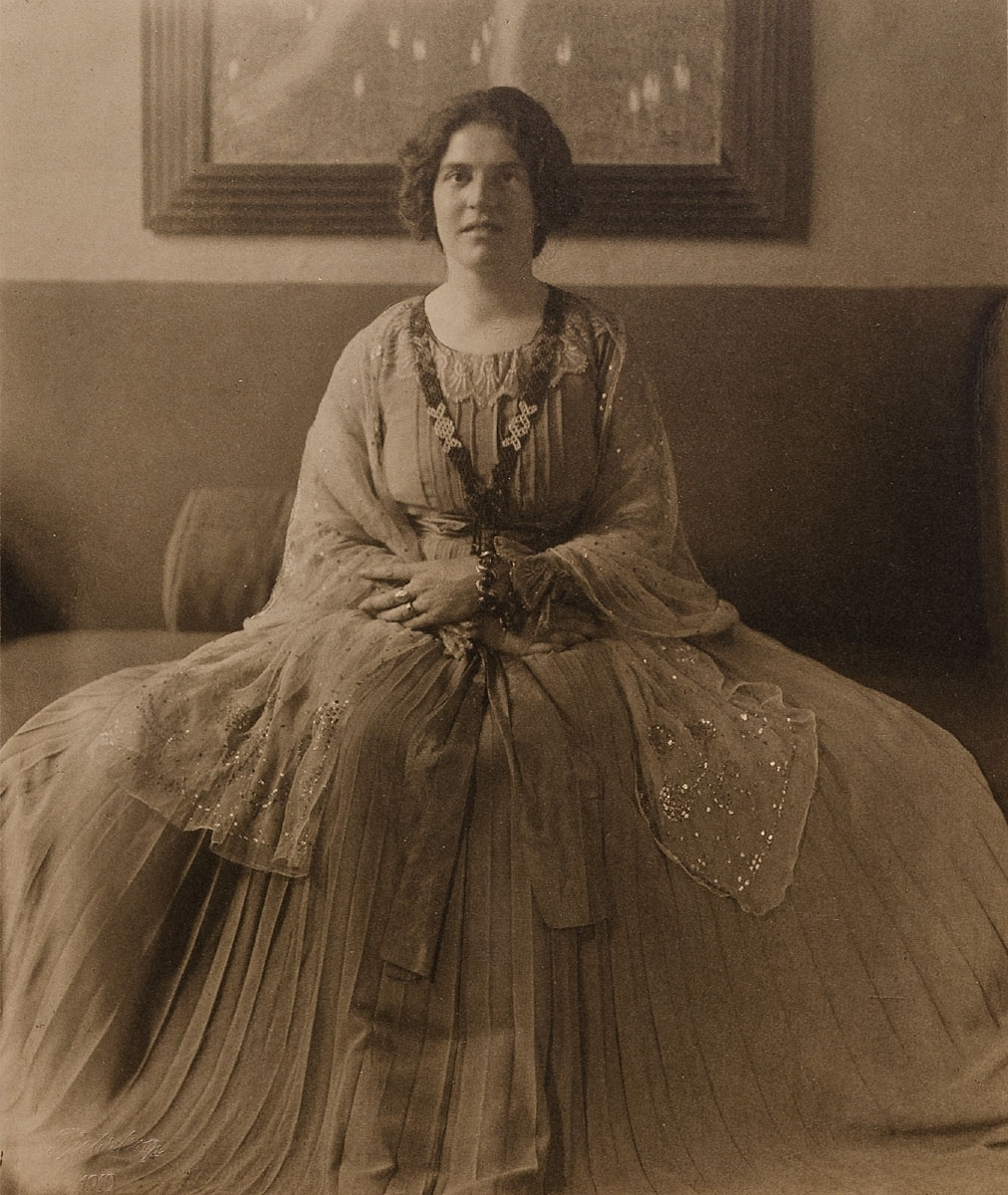
Portrait of Luksch-Makowsky

Elena Luksch-Makowsky, née Makowsky (born November 4, 1878, in Saint Petersburg, died August 15, 1967, in Hamburg) was a Russian painter and sculptor.

== Early life and career ==
Makowsky was born in 1878 in Saint Petersburg, and was the daughter of Konstantin Makovsky and niece of Vladimir Makovsky, both court painters for the czars of Russia affiliated with the group of Russian artists known as Peredvizhniki ("Wanderers"). In 1889, Elena and her siblings embarked on a tour of Europe with their mother, Julia Makowsky, which included trips to Venice, Florence, Nice and other places, and to which Luksch-Makowsky would later credit her ability with languages and fluency in English, French, and German. Although Makowsky's childhood included training for her assumed future as wife, mother and homemaker, her father acknowledged and encouraged her artistic talents.

Ver Sacrum, 1901.

Between 1894 and 1896, Makowsky studied with Ilya Repin at the St. Petersburg Academy, where she won a scholarship to study with Anton Ažbe in Munich. From Munich, Makowsky had a studio in Dutenhofen northeast of Dachau, where she met her future husband, the Viennese sculptor Richard Luksch, in 1900. She accepted Luksch's proposal with the promise that should be able to return to Russia at any time, and would continue to work as an independent artist. Their son, Peter Luksch, was born in 1901.

Luksch-Makowsky moved to Vienna shortly after her marriage, and regularly exhibited with the Vienna Secessionists until they split in 1905. She was the only woman artist with a monogram within the group, but was not granted voting rights. In 1902, Lucsch-Makowsky was featured prominently in the 14th Vienna Secession exhibition, also known at the Beethoven exhibition. In 1903, she contributed color woodcuts to a special issue of Ver Sacrum. During her time in Vienna she also worked for the Wiener Werkstätte and designed three reliefs for the main façade of the Burgtheater, as well as two of her most prominent works, Adolescentia and Ver Sacrum.

In 1907, the Lukschs moved to Hamburg after Richard Luksch was made a professor at the School of Arts and Crafts. it was there that Luksch-Makowsky began work on her sculpture, Frauenschicksal (Woman's Fate), which art historians have suggested foreshadows her struggle as a single parent. Indeed, when she and Luksch divorced in 1921 she was left to support her three sons on her own.

Her ability to support her family was an issue throughout the rest of her life, although she did accept commissions under the Reichskammer der Bildenden Kunste (Reich Chamber of Fine Arts). Following the Second World War, her artistic work was primarily focused on religious iconography and decoration for the Russian Orthodox congregation in Hamburg.

Her work was included in the 2019 exhibition City Of Women: Female artists in Vienna from 1900 to 1938 at the Österreichische Galerie Belvedere.
