= Broncia Koller-Pinell =

Austrian painter (1863–1934)

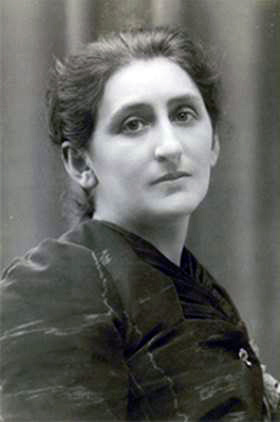
- Broncia Koller-Pinell (c.1900)
- Born: Bronisława Pineles; 25 February 1863; Sanok, Poland
- Died: 26 April 1934 (aged 71); Oberwaltersdorf, Austria
- Known for: Painting
- Movement: Expressionism
- Spouse: Hugo Koller (m. 1896)

Broncia Koller-Pinell (25 February 1863 – 26 April 1934) was an Austrian expressionist painter who specialized in portraits and still-lifes.

== Life ==
She was born as Bronisława Pineles to a Jewish family in Sanok in what is now Poland. Her father, Saul Pineles, was a designer of military fortifications. In 1870, they moved to Vienna to start a manufacturing business (where they changed the family name to "Pinell") and she took private art lessons with Alois Delug. In 1885, she had her first public exhibition. For the next five years, she studied in Munich at the "Damenakademie" of the Munich Artists' Association in the studios of Ludwig von Herterich. This was followed by exhibitions at the Vienna Künstlerhaus, in Munich and in Leipzig. Koller-Pinell exhibited her work at The Woman's Building at the 1893 World's Columbian Exposition in Chicago, Illinois.

In 1896, against her family's wishes, she married the physicist and industrialist, Dr. Hugo Koller, who was a Catholic. Their children were raised as Christians, but she never converted. At first, they lived in Salzburg and Nuremberg, but returned to Vienna in 1902. Shortly after, she was accepted as a member of the Vienna Secession. In 1904, she inherited a house in Oberwaltersdorf. The family soon moved there, and she had it decorated by Josef Hoffmann and Koloman Moser, associates from the Secession. Shortly after, she set up a salon that was frequented by Egon Schiele, Anton Faistauer and Albert Paris Gütersloh, among others.

In 1907 she painted a portrait of her closest painter colleague Heinrich Schröder, and in 1908 and 1909 she took part in the Klimt Group's art show. This was followed in 1911 by a major exhibition at the Galerie Miethke, Vienna, together with the works of Heinrich Schröder under the title Koller-Schröder. The exhibition catalog is preserved today in the digital collection of the Belvedere. The exhibition was comprehensively reviewed by Bertha Zuckerkandl-Szeps in the Wiener Allgemeine Zeitung.

In 1913, she was accepted into the Association of Austrian Artists, which emerged from the Klimt Group and in which she took part in international exhibitions. In 1913 in Budapest and Brussels, in 1914 in Leipzig and Rome.

After the First World War, Koller-Pinell maintained close artistic contact with Anton Faistauer, Albert Paris Gütersloh, Heinrich Schröder, Carl Hofer and Franz von Zülow. Contact with Egon Schiele intensified in 1918. Schiele painted a portrait of Hugo Koller that year, the work is now in the Belvedere collection. In the same year, Broncia painted the Schiele couple while they were spending August in Oberwaltersdorf.

In 1919, Koller-Pinell exhibited her works with the artists' association Der Wassermann in Salzburg. In 1924, the German painter Carl Hofer visited Oberwaltersdorf and painted a portrait of Broncia (now in the Belvedere Collection). In 1927, under the direction of Fanny Harlfinger-Zakucka, the first exhibition of Viennese women's art was organized by the Association of Viennese Women's Art at the Museum of Applied Arts, Vienna (MAK). Koller-Pinell was represented with eight works alongside Helene Funke, Maria Cyrenius, Elfriede Miller-Haunfels and others. From 1930, she also exhibited with the Munich Secession.

Broncia Koller-Pinell died on April 24, 1934 as a result of an illness and was buried in the Döbling cemetery. On the occasion of her death, Heinrich Schröder wrote to her daughter Silvia Koller: “It is a consolation to know that her life was extremely gifted, even if the world, especially the artists in Vienna, could not grasp her value. There were worlds in between. Her achievement goes far beyond the short span of her life.”

Her son, Rupert (1896–1976), became a conductor and was briefly married to Anna Mahler. Her daughter Silvia (1898–1963) was also a painter.

== Posthumous Recognition ==
The posthumous recognition began in 1961 by Silvia Koller with the memorial exhibition Broncia Koller. 1863-1934. at the Austrian State Printing House in Vienna. The Austrian Belvedere Gallery acquired the work The Harvest from the show.[8] This was followed in 1980 by a retrospective at the Landesgalerie Niederösterreich.

In 1991, a solo exhibition “Broncia Koller-Pinell” took place at Kunsthandel Hieke, Vienna under the direction of art historian and art dealer Dr. Ursula Hieke. Also in 1991, the Jewish Museum Vienna showed her work under the title Broncia Koller-Pinell. Her work was included in the 2019 exhibition City Of Women: Female artists in Vienna from 1900 to 1938 at the Österreichische Galerie Belvedere.

In 2024 the Belvedere Museum, Vienna shows "Broncia Koller-Pinell. An artist and her network". The exhibition is accompanied by a comprehensive publication.

== Selected paintings ==
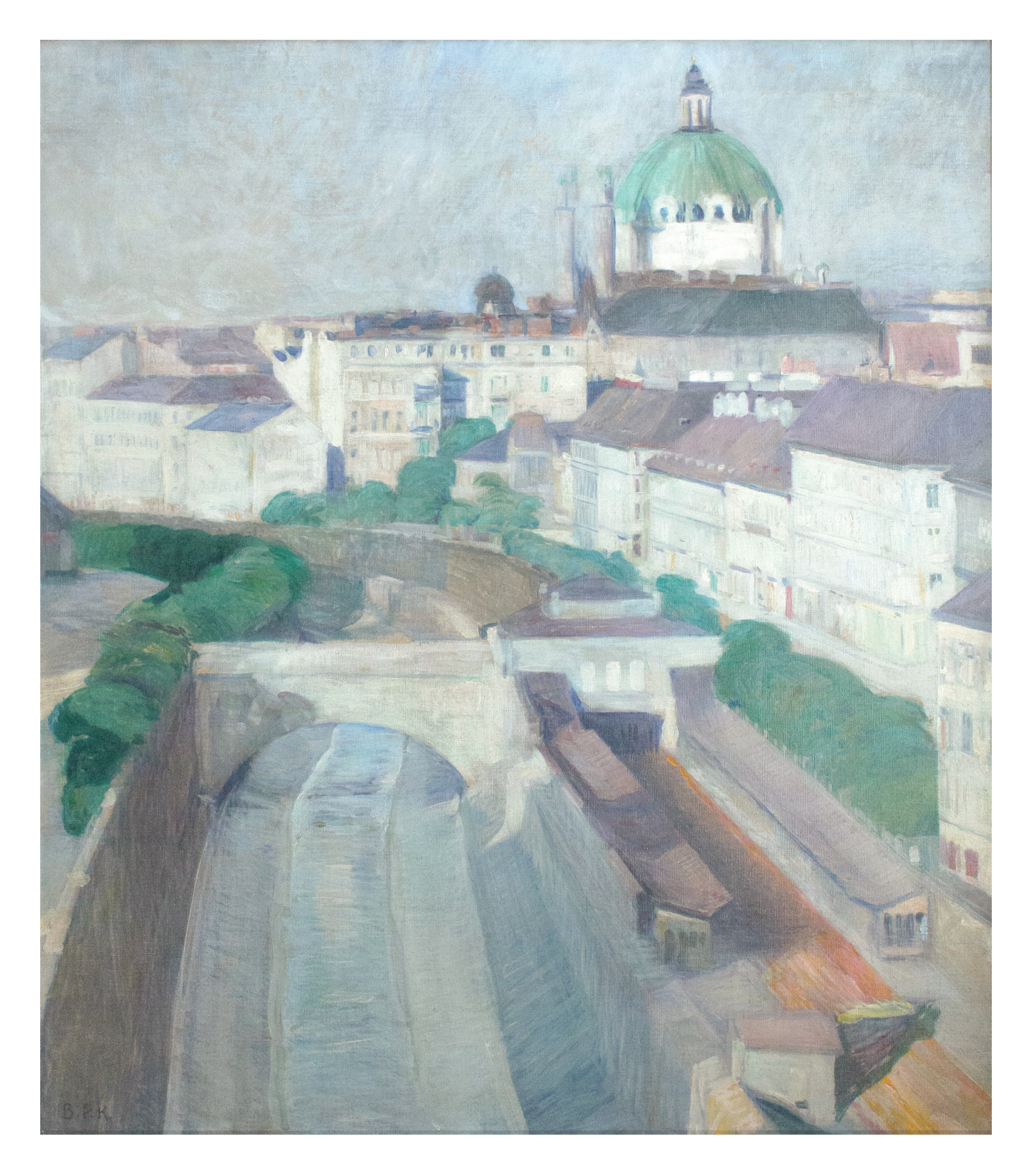
"Blick über das Wiental", vor 1902

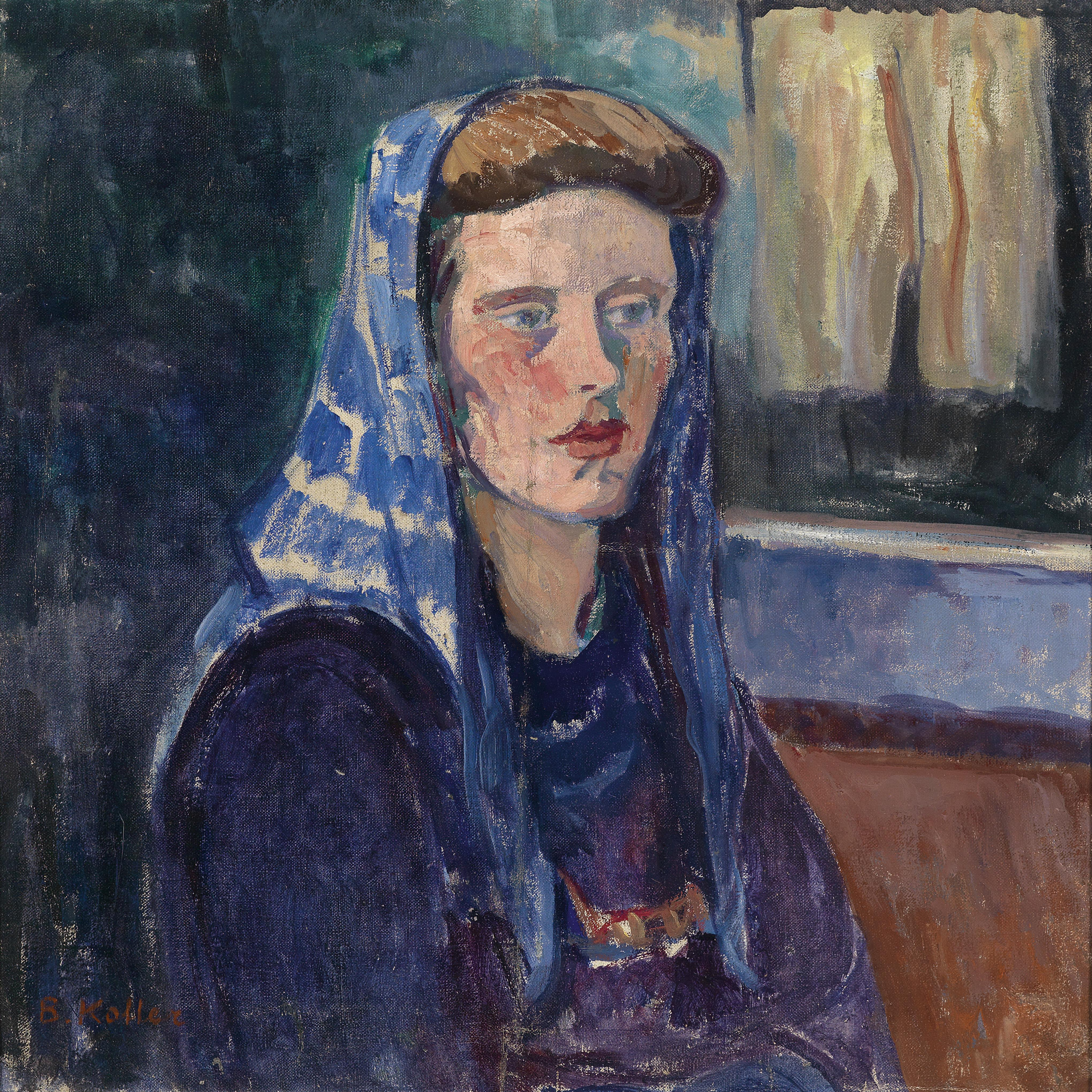
Woman with Blue Headscarf
(date unknown)

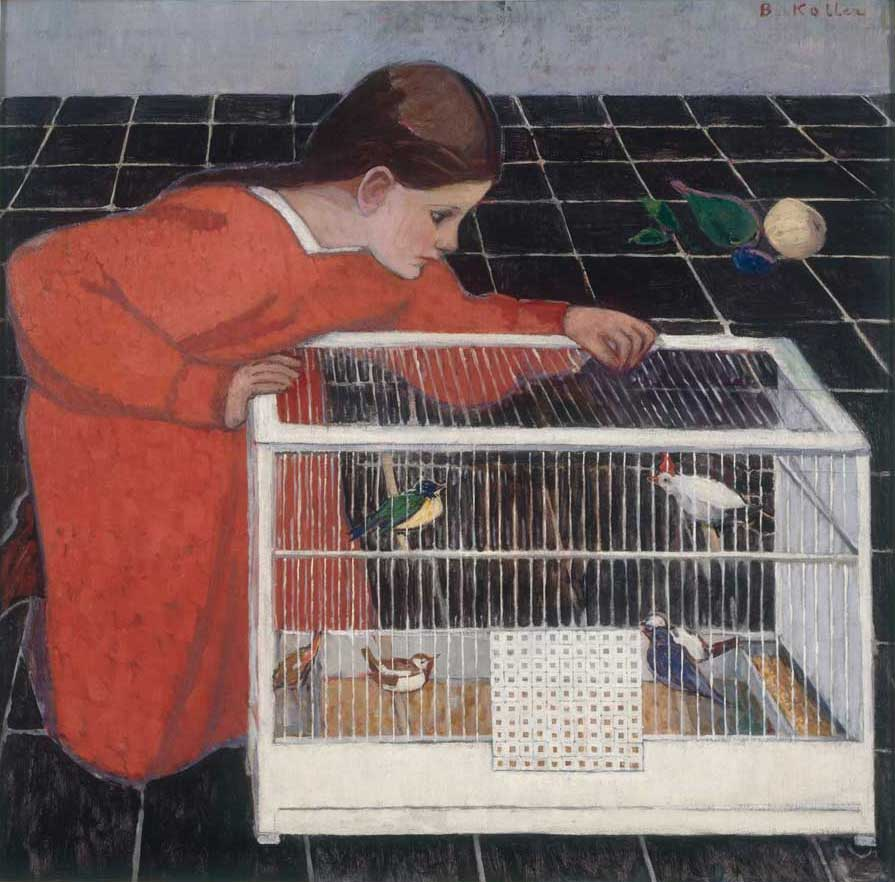
Silvia Koller with Bird Cage (c.1905)

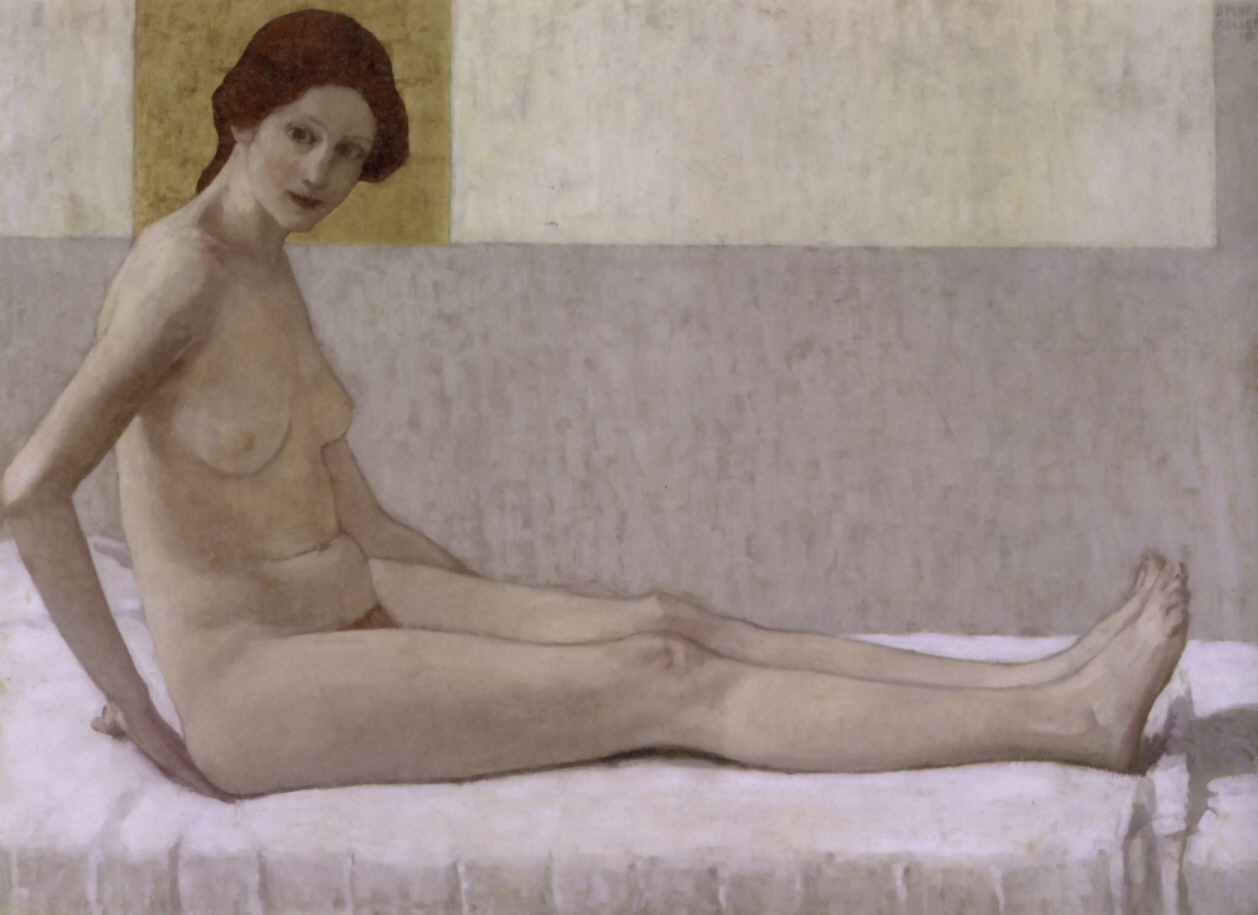
Sitting (1907)

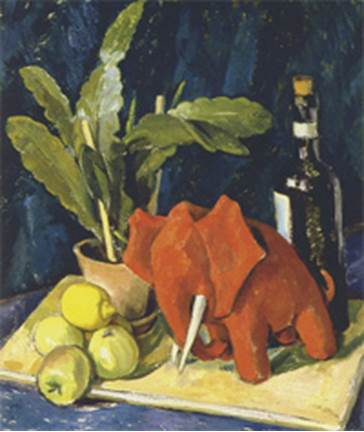
Still-life with Red Elephant (c.1920)

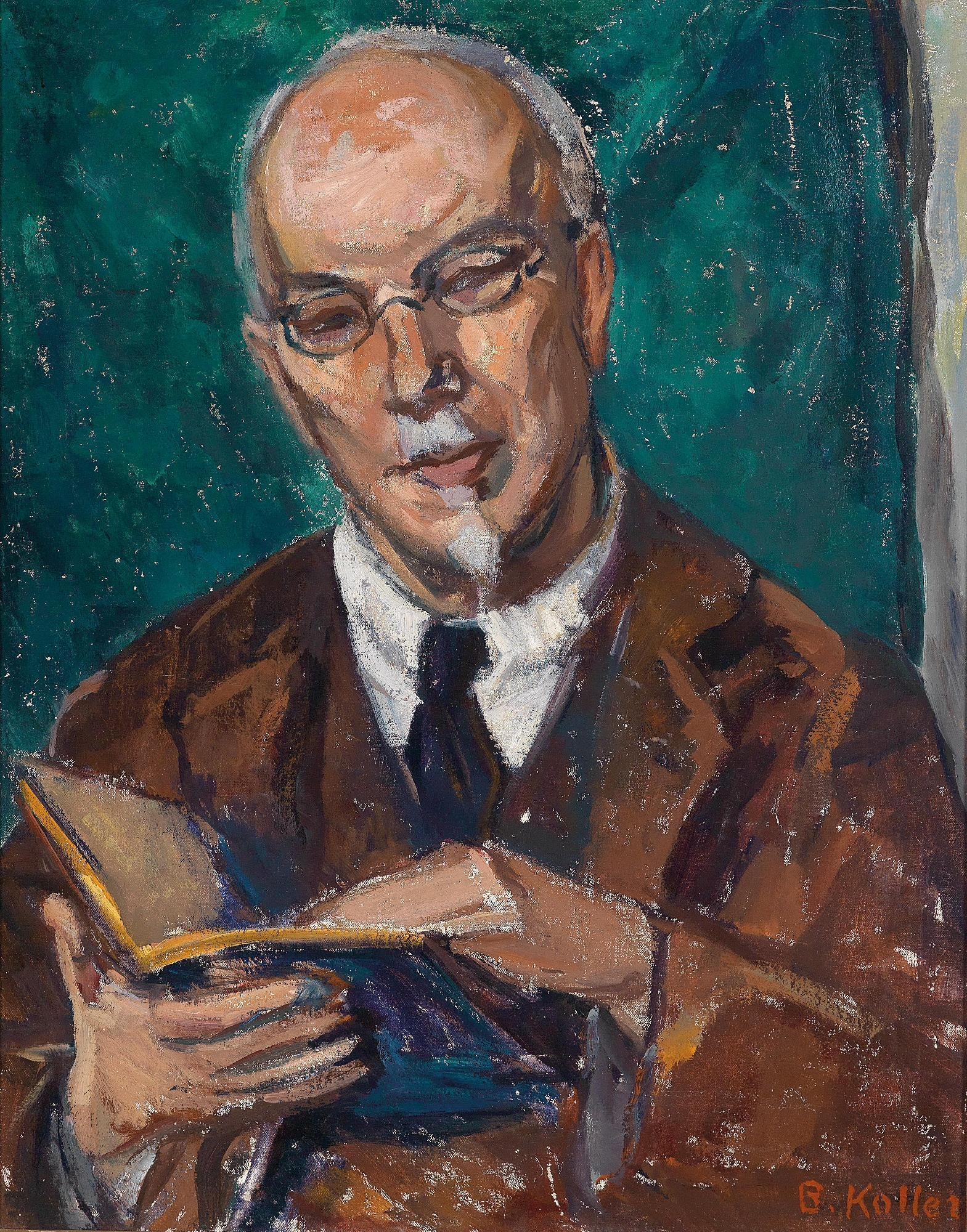
Portrait of Friedrich Eckstein (1920s)
