= Ver Sacrum (magazine) =

Art magazine of the Vienna Secession

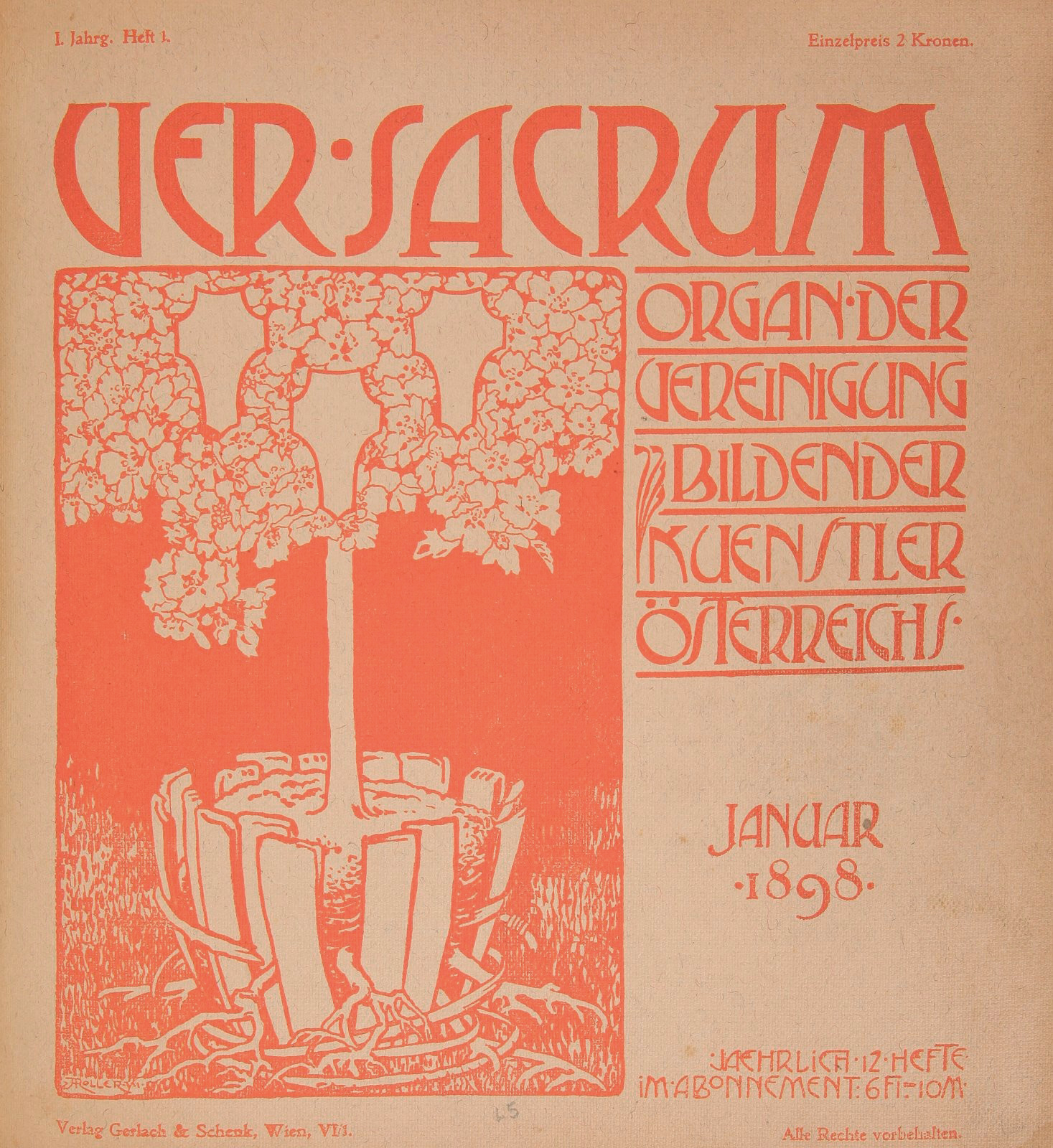
Alfred Roller (1898), Cover of the first issue of Ver Sacrum

Ver Sacrum (meaning "Sacred Spring" in Latin) was the official magazine of the Vienna Secession. Founded by Gustav Klimt and Max Kurzweil, it was published from 1898 to 1903, featuring drawings and designs in the Secession style along with literary contributions from distinguished writers from across Europe. These included Rainer Maria Rilke, Hugo von Hofmannsthal, Maurice Maeterlinck, Knut Hamsun, Otto Julius Bierbaum, Richard Dehmel, Ricarda Huch, Conrad Ferdinand Meyer, Josef Maria Auchentaller and Arno Holz. Koloman Moser was the magazine's chief designer.

== See also ==
- List of magazines in Austria
