= The Family (Schiele) =

Painting by Egon Schiele

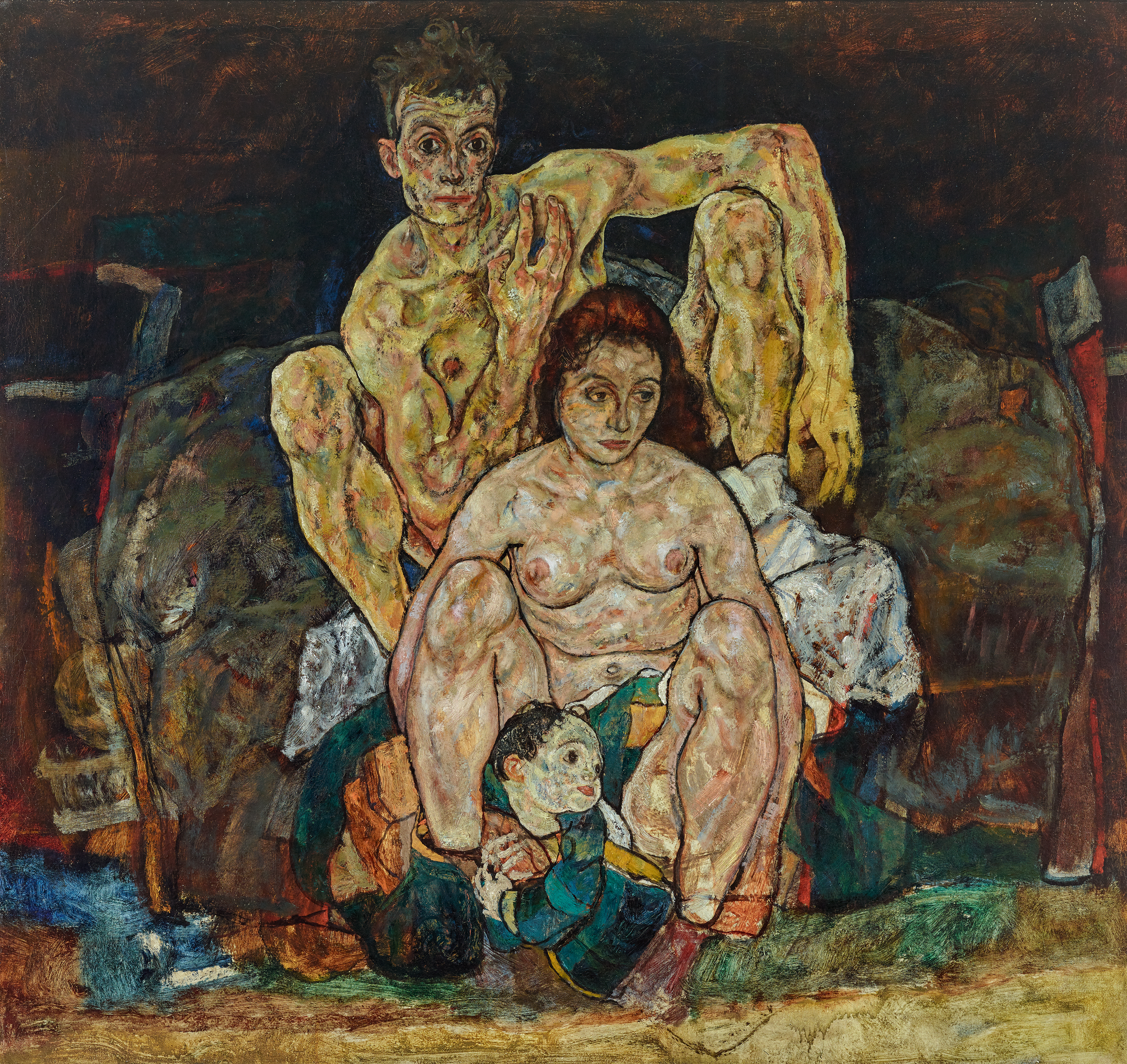
Egon Schiele, The Family, 1918, Belvedere Gallery, Vienna.

The Family (in German, "Die Familie") was one of the last oil paintings made by Austrian painter Egon Schiele before he died of Spanish flu on 31 October 1918. The work measures 152.5 cm × 162.5 cm (60.0 in × 64.0 in) and is held by the Belvedere Gallery in Vienna.

The painting was initially entitled Crouching Couple (German: "Kauerndes Menschenpaar") and depicted the artist and a woman, both squatting naked with knees raised. The woman's skin is a lighter pink tone, but the man a darker bronze against the yet darker background. The figures are arranged in a solid pyramidal composition, with the woman on the floor gazing into space to her left with her arms by her sides. She is resting between the legs of the man, who is slightly elevated on a bed or couch, calmly regarding the viewer, with his left arm bent over and resting on his left knee and his right hand across his heart raised to his left collar.

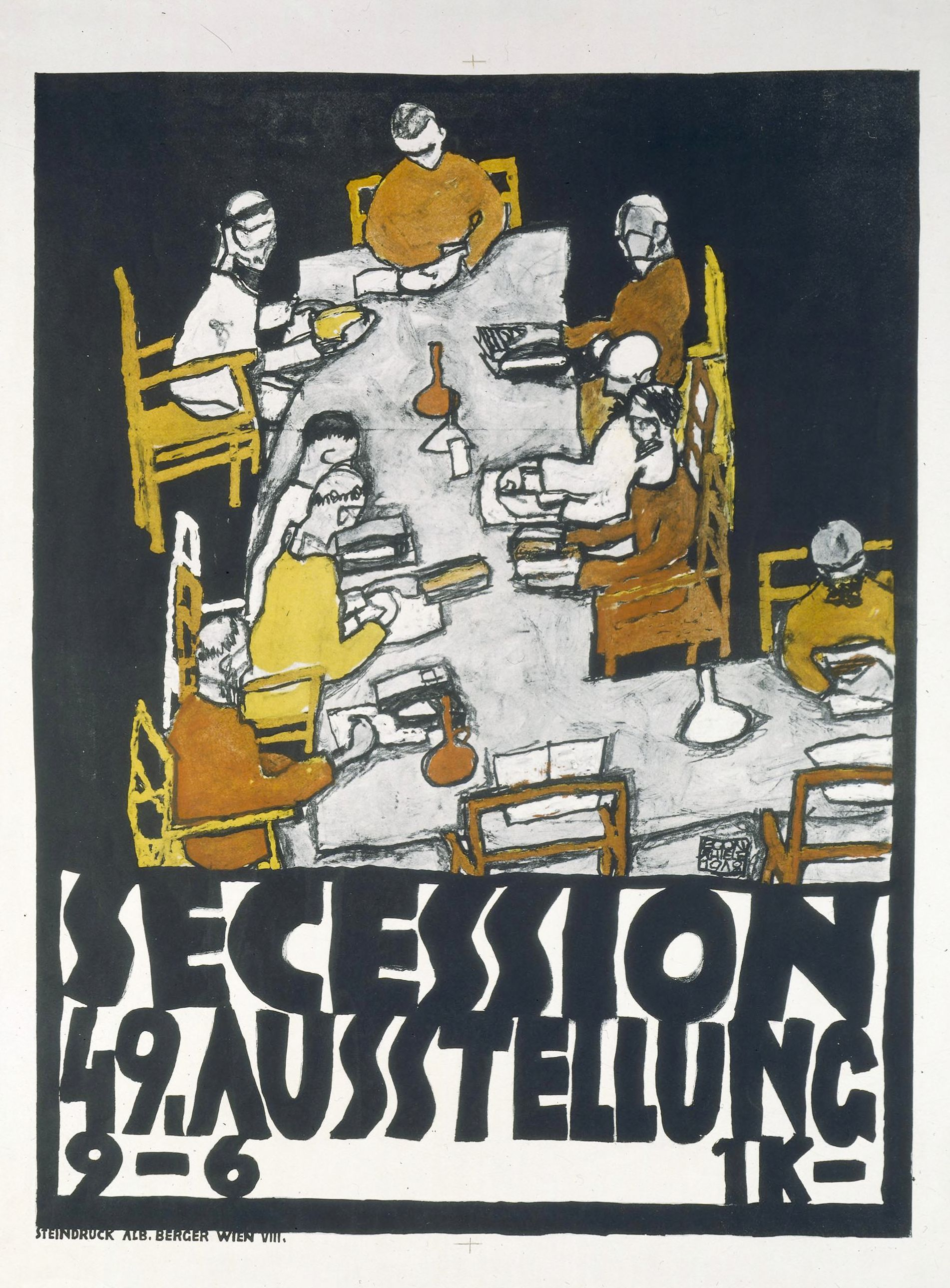
Schiele's poster for the 49th exhibition of the Vienna Secession in 1918

The model for the woman is not Schiele's wife, Edith (née Harms), and may instead be his former lover Wally Neuzil. Edith was expecting their first child at the time of painting, and at a later point Schiele overpainted a bouquet of flowers that had been placed between the woman's legs with a child wrapped a blanket, modelled by his nephew Toni. Some parts of the painting appear unfinished, including the man's left hand.

Schiele's light duties in the Austro-Hungarian Army during the First World War allowed him to continue painting and exhibiting. This painting was exhibited at the 49th exhibition of the Vienna Secession in 1918, for which Schiele also designed the poster. The exhibition included 19 of his paintings and 24 drawings. Schiele was perhaps the leading painter in Vienna following the death of Gustav Klimt in February 1918 from a stroke followed by pneumonia caused by Spanish flu.

Edith Schiele died of Spanish flu on 28 October 1918, six months into her pregnancy. The child did not survive, and Schiele himself succumbed to the same disease three days later.

The painting was acquired by the Belvedere Gallery in 1948 from the Austrian artist Hans Böhler during the time he was living in the US.
