= Fanny Harlfinger-Zakucka =

Austrian artist

- Born: Fanny Zakucka; 26 May 1873; Mank, Austria
- Died: 19 September 1954 (aged 81); Vienna, Austria
- Known for: painting, graphic art
- Movement: Vienna Secession
- Spouse: Richard Harlfinger

Fanny Harlfinger-Zakucka (1873-1954) was an Austrian painter, graphic artist and craftswoman.

== Biography ==
Harlfinger-Zakucka née Zakucka was born on 26 May 1873 in Mank. She studied at the University of Applied Arts Vienna. She was married to the painter Richard Harlfinger and both were active in the Vienna Secession. She was also a member of the Vereinigung bildender Künstlerinnen Österreichs (Austrian Association of Women Artists) and the Wiener Werkstätte. In 1926 she helped organize Wiener Frauenkunst (Viennese Women's Art).

Harlfinger-Zakucka died on 19 September 1954 in Vienna. Her work was included in the 2012 exhibit Century of the Child: Growing by Design, 1900–2000 at the Museum of Modern Art. Her work was included in the 2019 exhibition City Of Women: Female artists in Vienna from 1900 to 1938 at the Österreichische Galerie Belvedere.
