= Auditorium of the Old Burgtheater =

1888–1889 painting by Gustav Klimt

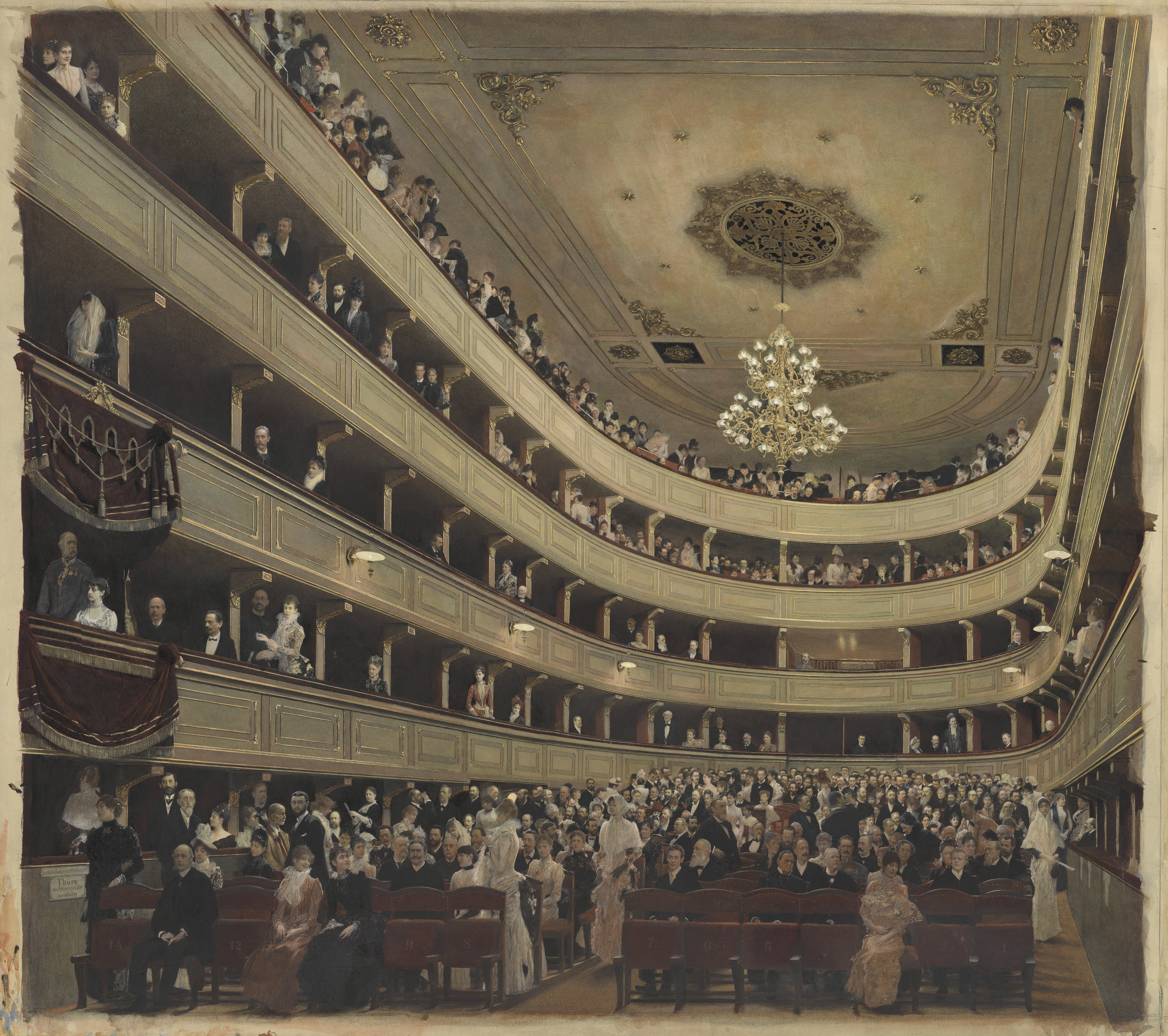
- Artist: Gustav Klimt
- Year: 1888–1889
- Medium: Gouache on paper
- Dimensions: 91.2 cm × 103 cm (35.9 in × 41 in)
- Location: Vienna Museum, Vienna

Auditorium of the Old Burgtheater (German: Zuschauerraum im Alten Burgtheater) is an 1888–1889 gouache on paper painting by Austrian artist Gustav Klimt. The work depicts the interior of the old Burgtheater as seen from the stage and was commissioned in 1888 by the Vienna City Council shortly before the theater's demolition and relocation to a new building on the Ringstrasse. Today, the painting is held in the Vienna Museum.

== Context ==
The original Burgtheater was built on Michaelerplatz in 1741. It was demolished in 1888, after its replacement on the Ringstrasse was completed, to make way for the long-planned St. Michael Wing of the Hofburg Palace, originally designed in 1725 by Joseph Emanuel Fischer von Erlach. An October 1888 performance of Goethe's Iphigenie auf Tauris, marked the end of the old wooden theater, which Viennese audiences had loved despite its abysmal conditions. That same year, Klimt and Franz von Matsch were each commissioned by the City of Vienna to paint the interior of the auditorium before its demolition, to create a record of the building's existence.

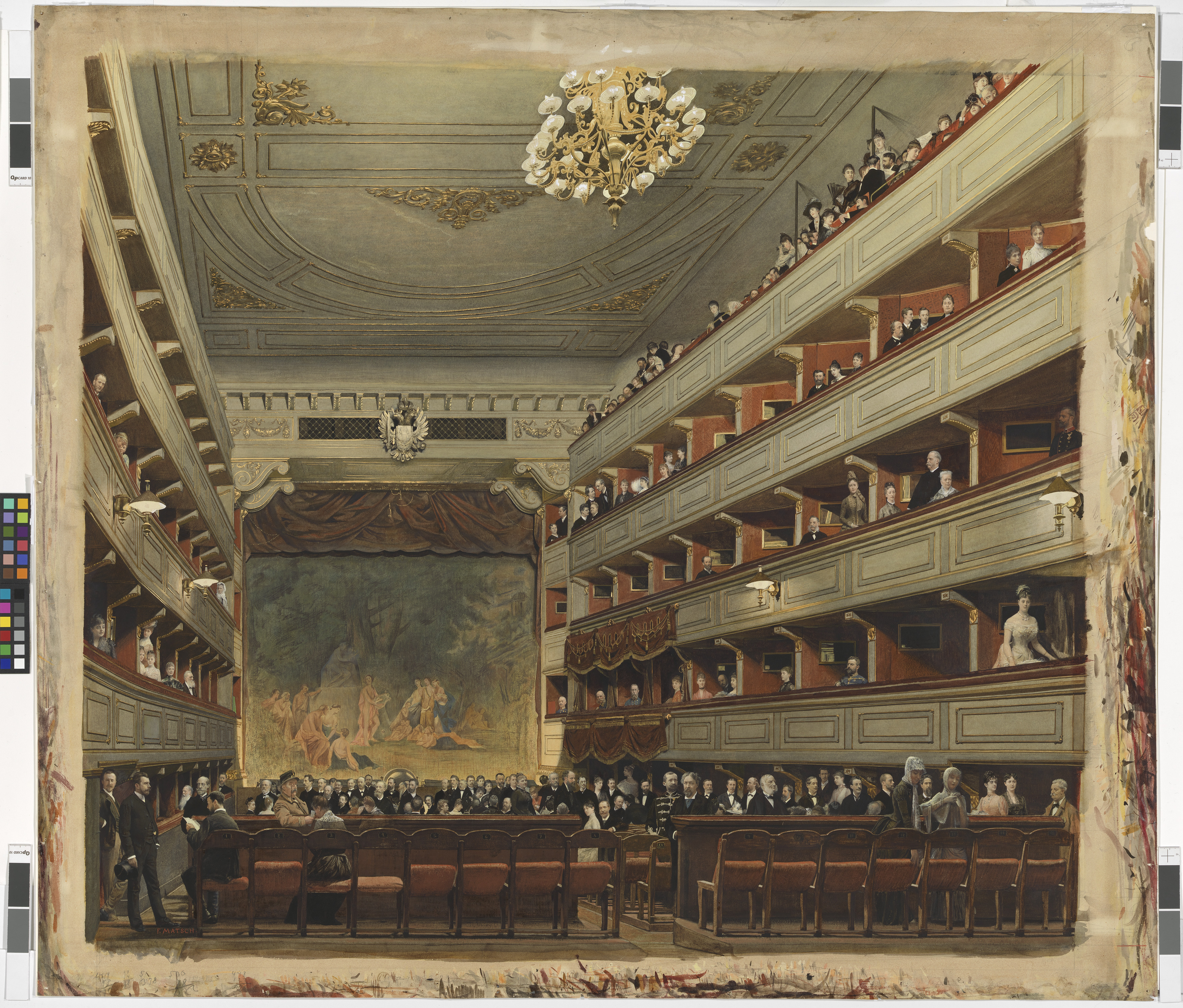
Franz von Matsch's painting of the old Burgtheater (1888)

== Description ==
In Auditorium of the Old Burgtheater, Klimt depicts the auditorium viewed from the stage, whereas Matsch chose to render the stage from the auditorium. The composition shows a full view of the auditorium, and according to The Art Story, reflects Klimt's early academic style and the influence of Hans Makart. Klimt adopts a low viewpoint from the right side of the stage, revealing a wide perspective of the auditorium that extends toward the Imperial box on the left, where Archduke Karl Ludwig of Austria and his third wife Archduchess Maria Theresia of Braganza are depicted.

The painting includes almost 200 miniature portraits of audience members, of whom 133 can be identified as prominent members of Viennese society. Among them are composers Johannes Brahms and Karl Goldmark; the Emperor's mistress and actor Katharina Schratt; Klimt's brother Ernst; journalist Eduard Bacher; actors Alexander Girardi and Zerline Gabillon; physician Theodor Billroth; architect Karl von Hasenauer with his family; and many of Klimt's later patrons, such as Serena Lederer. Around the upper balconies, some members of the audience are shown to be using opera glasses, while others lean over the rail to watch the crowd below. Among the spectators are several anonymous female figures, identifiable by their fans and evening veils, moving unaccompanied along the centre and outer aisles. When Karl Lueger, later the mayor of Vienna, was found to be missing from the painting, Klimt inserted him afterwards.

The work, which had been commissioned to be as "authentic and correct as possible", was delayed in its completion due to Klimt's efforts to make precise measurements of the auditorium's architecture and floor plan. The audience is depicted returning to their seats after an intermission, rendered with near-photographic realism. Marian Bisanz-Prakken noted that despite a lack of doubt on the use of photographs and other reference materials, Klimt also produced many studies on site, making spontaneous sketches of individuals, groups, and the auditorium's interior. The Vienna Museum's collection includes 25 preparatory drawings and a sketchbook from this project. Klimt hired some of his friends and relatives to pose as models for members of the audience, rather than professionals, to reduce costs. Jane Rogoyska writes that despite the near photographic realism of the audience, the painting's overall effect is "curiously stilted and artificial as if it were an elaborate collage" and "far removed from the exciting and innovative styles that Klimt would develop a decade later".

== Reception and history ==
Auditorium of the Old Burgtheater was exhibited for preview on 17 November 1889 at the Vienna City Museum, alongside Matsch's Auditorium in the Old Burgtheater. The painting was met with great public approval. Some of the models for the depicted audience commissioned Klimt to make copies of the painting, and several heliogravures were distributed. During its first official exhibition at the nineteenth annual exhibition of the Vienna Künstlerhaus in March 1890, around 60,000 onlookers viewed the work. Following the exhibition, on 25 April, Klimt was awarded the Emperor's Prize (Kaiserpreis) of 400 ducats, which was reserved exclusively for "the promotion of patriotic artistic works". According to The Art Story, the award "significantly raised his profile within the Viennese art community" and sparked a trend of public commissions for Ringstrasse buildings. Klimt's subsequent society portrait commissions confirmed his status as the most fashionable portraitist of the day.

The Vienna Museum acquired the painting in 1907. It remains in their collection today.

== See also ==
- List of paintings by Gustav Klimt
