= Fritz L'Allemand =

Austrian painter (1812-1866)

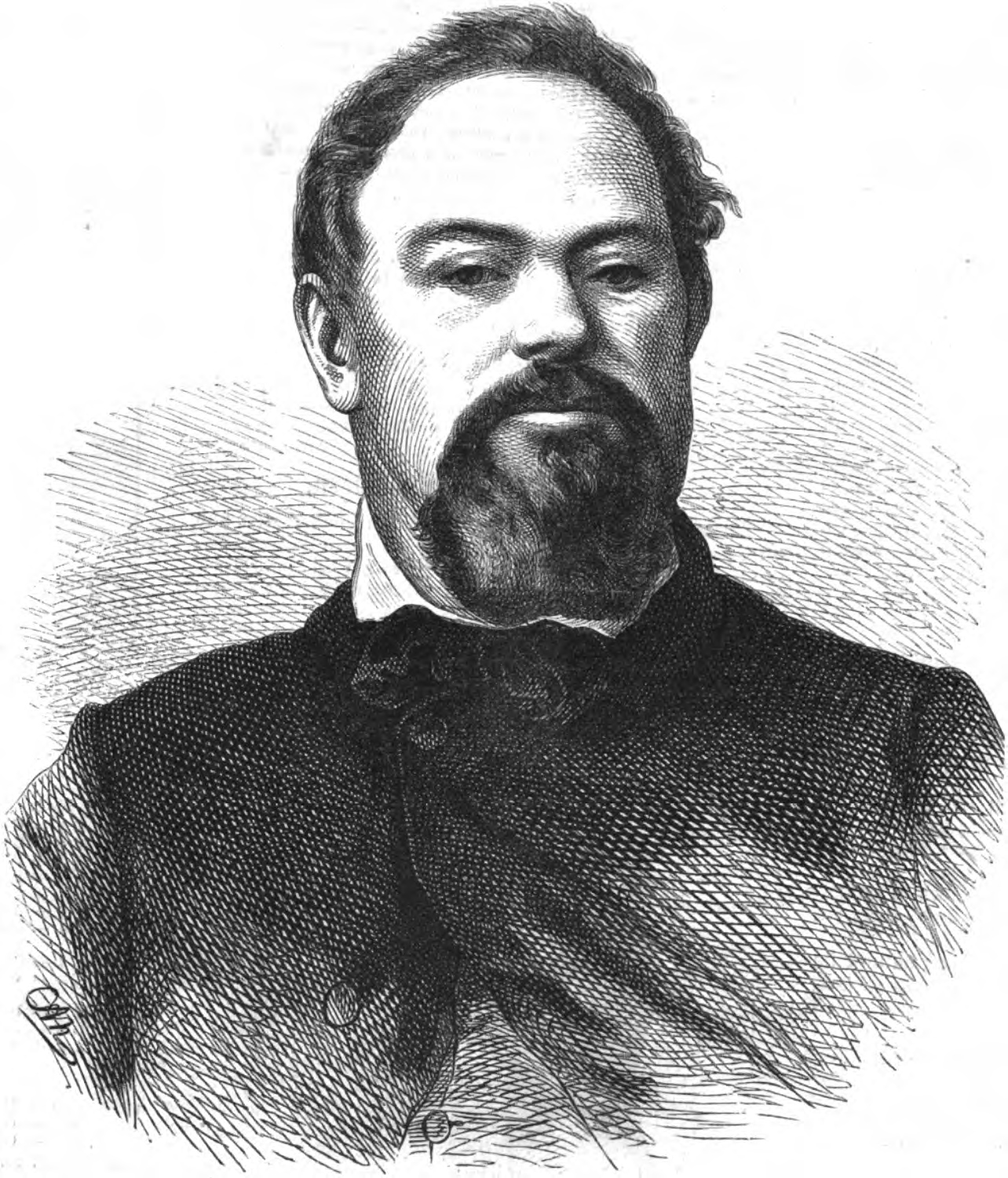
Fritz L'Allemand; engraving by Adolf Neumann (1866)

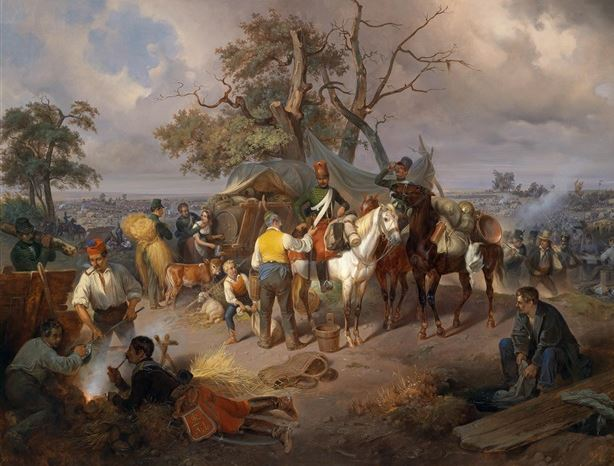
Field Camp of the Imperial Hussar Regiment No. 5

Friedrich Wilhelm L'Allemand, known as Fritz (24 May 1812, Hanau - 20 September 1866, Vienna) was an Austrian history painter.

== Biography ==
He came from a family of artists. His grandfather, Konrad Marcus Christian L'Allemand (1752-1830) was a well-known engraver, as was his father, Siegmund Wilhelm Christoph L'Allemand (1774–1856). His eldest brother, Conrad, worked as a medallist in Frankfurt am Main and Hannover. His other brother, Thaddäus (1810–1872) was an engraver in Vienna.

In 1826, his family moved to Vienna, where he attended school. From 1827, he studied at the Academy of Fine Arts with Josef Klieber and Joseph von Führich. He received support from the history painter, Johann Peter Krafft, who was also originally from Hanau. He had his first public showing in 1835, and worked in the studios of Friedrich Schilcher until 1838.

In 1848, he became an advisory member of the Academy. He married Maria Anna Brunner in 1849. They had two sons who died as children. In 1861, he joined the Vienna Künstlerhaus.

At first, he focused on portraits and genre scenes, but later turned to painting battles; some generic, some historic. Over time, he favored motifs from the War of the Fifth Coalition (1809), the Austrian Revolutions (1848), and the Second Schleswig War (1864). These scenes found an enthusiastic patron in Kaiser Franz Joseph I. He also illustrated books of military uniforms.

His nephew, Siegmund L'Allemand, was a military painter as well, and received some of his first lessons from him. Many of his works are in the Museum of Military History. Some may be seen at Schönbrunn Palace.

== Sources ==
- Constantin von Wurzbach: "L'Allemand, Friedrich." In: Biographisches Lexikon des Kaiserthums Oesterreich (Biographical Lexicon of the Empire of Austria). Part 14 Kaiserlich-königliche Hof- und Staatsdruckerei, Vienna 1865, p. 13–16 (digitalised).
- Karl Weiß (1883). "L'Allemand, Fritz" . Allgemeine Deutsche Biographie (in German). Vol. 17. Leipzig: Duncker & Humblot. pp. 530–531.
- Karl Siebert: "Hanauer Biographien aus drei Jahrhunderten", In: Hanauer Geschichtsverein 1844, 1919, pp. 116–118
- Schöny: "L'Allemand Friedrich (Fritz)". In: Österreichisches Biographisches Lexikon 1815–1950 (ÖBL). Vol. 4, Austrian Academy of Sciences, Vienna 1969, p. 408.
- Heinz Schöny (1982). "L'Allemand, Friedrich Wilhelm". Neue Deutsche Biographie (in German). Vol. 13. Berlin: Duncker & Humblot. pp. 424–425. (full text online).
