= Eduard Swoboda =

Austrian painter (1814–1902)

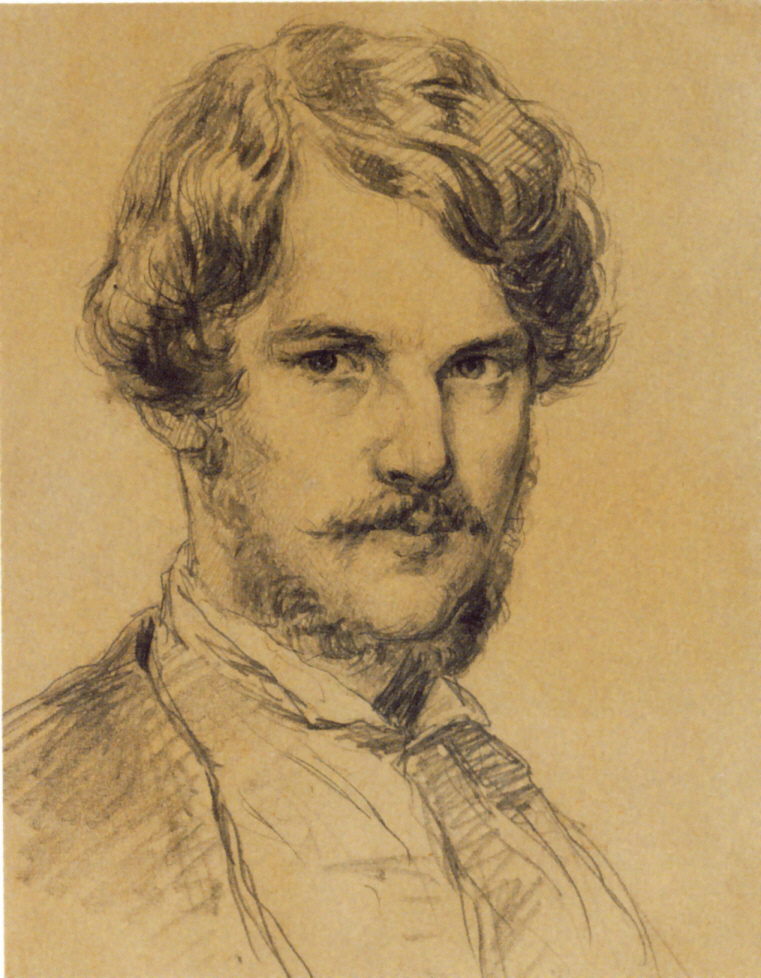
Self-portrait (1842)

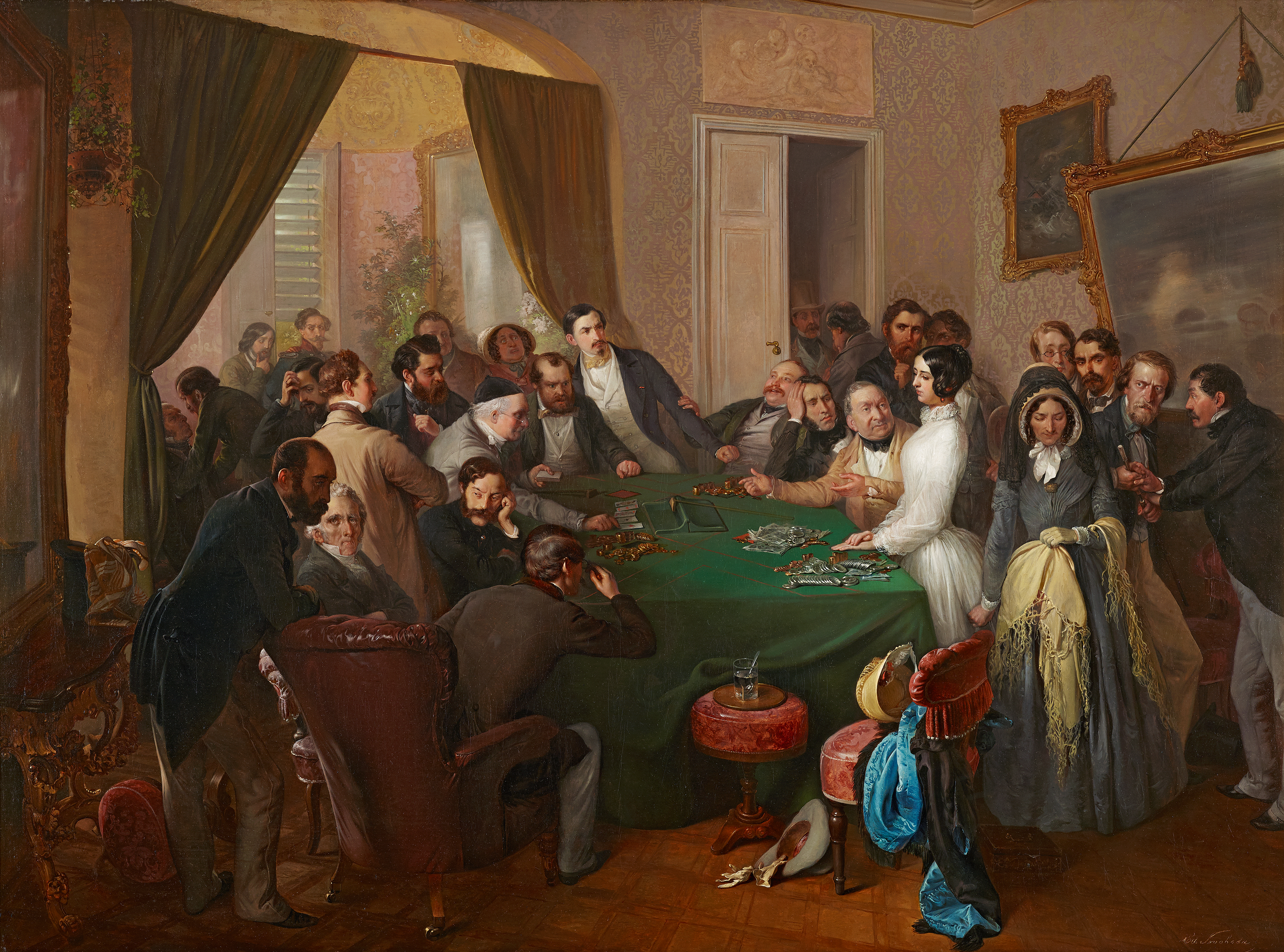
Gambling

Eduard Swoboda (14 November 1814, in Vienna – 13 September 1902, in Hallstatt) was an Austrian portrait, history and genre painter. His younger brother, Rudolf, was a landscape and animal painter.

== Biography ==
His father was a wool merchant. He studied at the Academy of Fine Arts, Vienna, with Anton Petter. In 1833, as a member of the "Schule der historischen Zeichnungsgründe", he was awarded the Gundel-Prize, for his excellence in the six major art categories. Later, he learned fresco painting from Friedrich Schilcher.

His first exhibit was held in 1834. The following year, he left Austria for Bohemia, where he initially painted portraits in Karlsbad, then continued his studies at the Academy of Fine Arts, Prague, with Christian Ruben. This was followed by extended stays in Pest (1836), Preßburg (1842) and Frankfurt am Main (1848). He also belonged to the Albrecht Dürer Association and, in 1861, became a member of the Vienna Künstlerhaus.

In 1843, he married Josefa Janscha, daughter of the porcelain painter, Franz Janscha (1784-1860). She died in 1854 and he remarried, in 1857, to Josefine Müller; daughter of the lithographer, Leopold Müller (1807-1862) and sister of the Orientalist painter, Leopold Carl Müller. Two of the children from his second marriage, Rudolf and Josefine, also became artists.

He died while vacationing near Salzkammergut and was interred at the Wiener Zentralfriedhof.

A large cycle of portraits of artists living in Vienna became very popular, through a series of lithographs. Some of his best known works are frescoes; including wall paintings at churches in Trumau, Reichenau and Schemnitz. He also restored frescoes in the Great Orangery at Schönbrunn Castle, and at various locations in Laxenburg. A major retrospective of his work was held in 1916 at the Künstlerhaus.

== Sources ==
- Constantin von Wurzbach: "Svoboda, Eduard." In: Biographisches Lexikon des Kaiserthums Oesterreich (Biographical Lexicon of the Empire of Austria). Part 41 Kaiserlich-königliche Hof- und Staatsdruckerei, Vienna 1880, p. 61–64 (digitalised).
