= Rudolf Swoboda =

Austrian Orientalist painter (1859–1914)

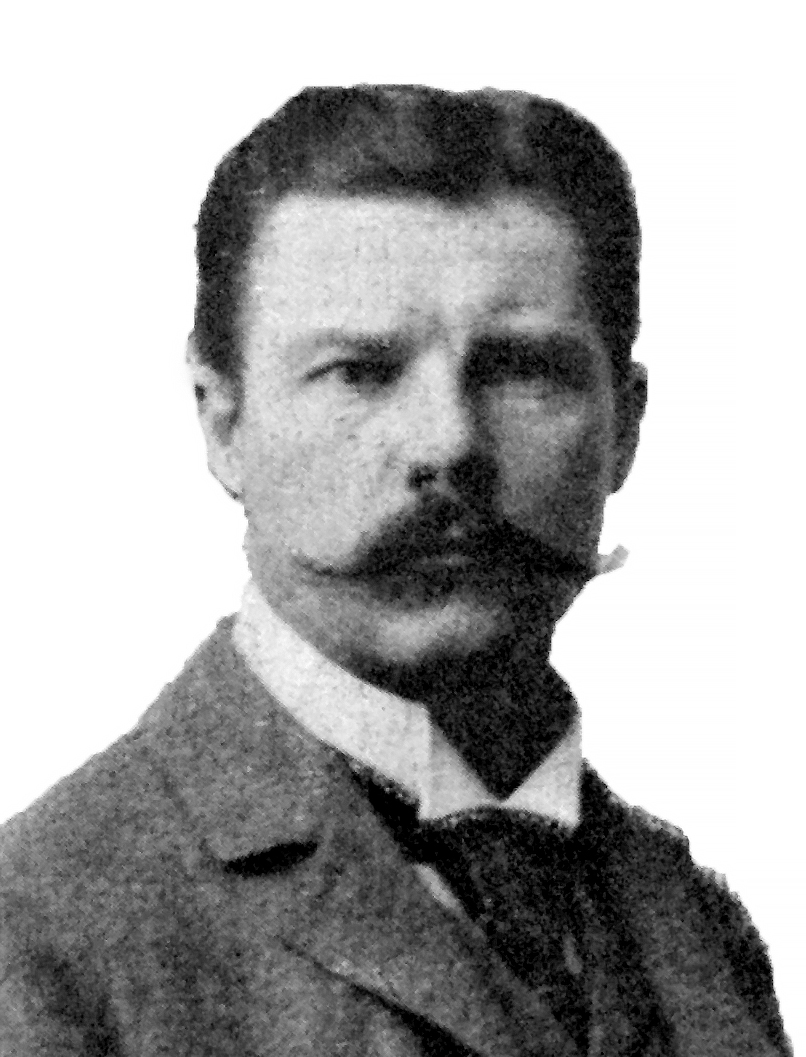
- Born: 4 October 1859; Vienna, Austria
- Died: 24 January 1914 (aged 54); Vienna, Austria
- Education: Leopold Carl Müller
- Known for: Painter
- Movement: Orientalist

Rudolf Swoboda (1859–1914) was a 19th-century Austrian Orientalist painter. He was sometimes known as The Younger, to distinguish him from his uncle Rudolf, who was also an artist.

== Biography ==
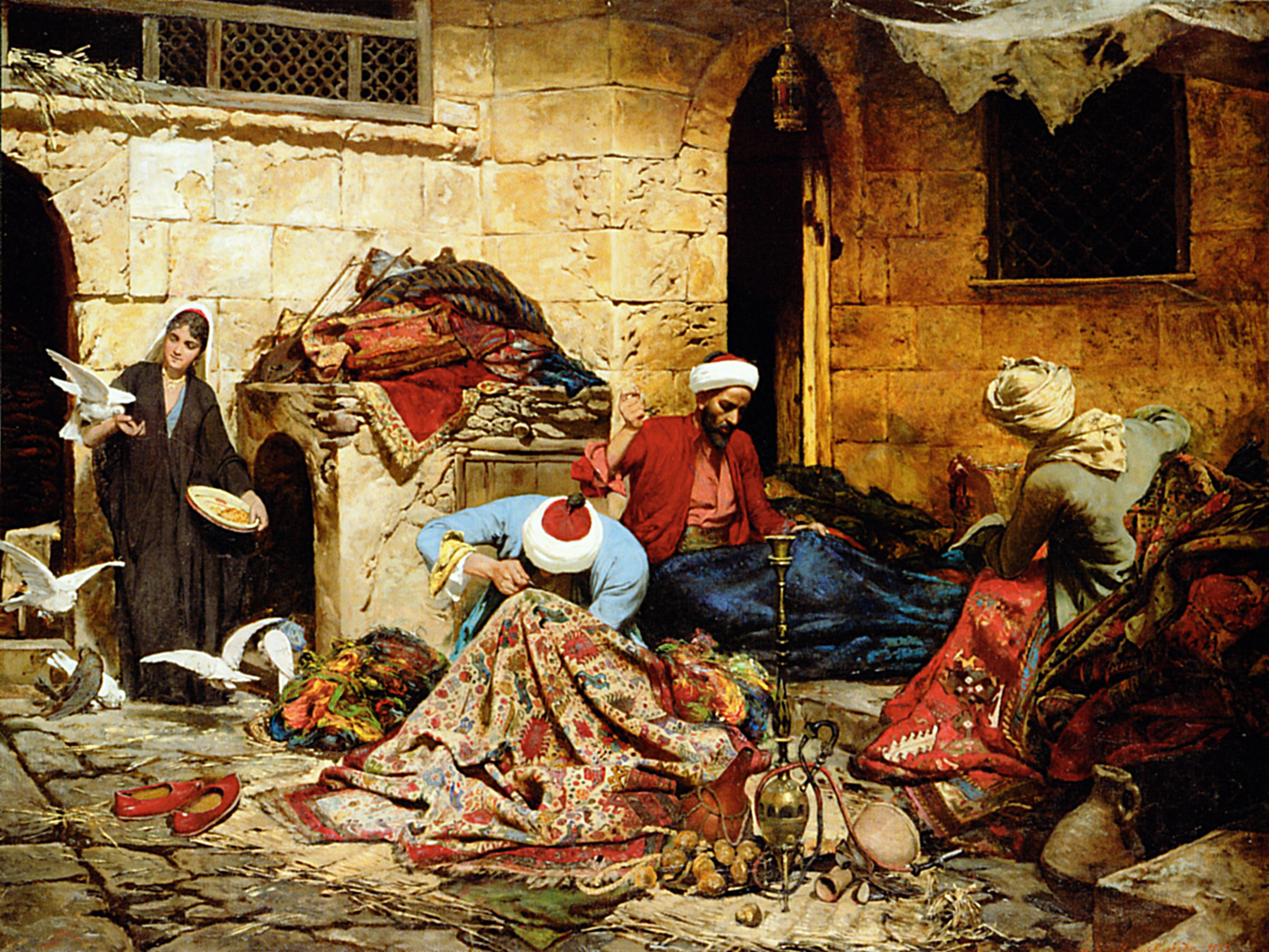
The Carpet Menders

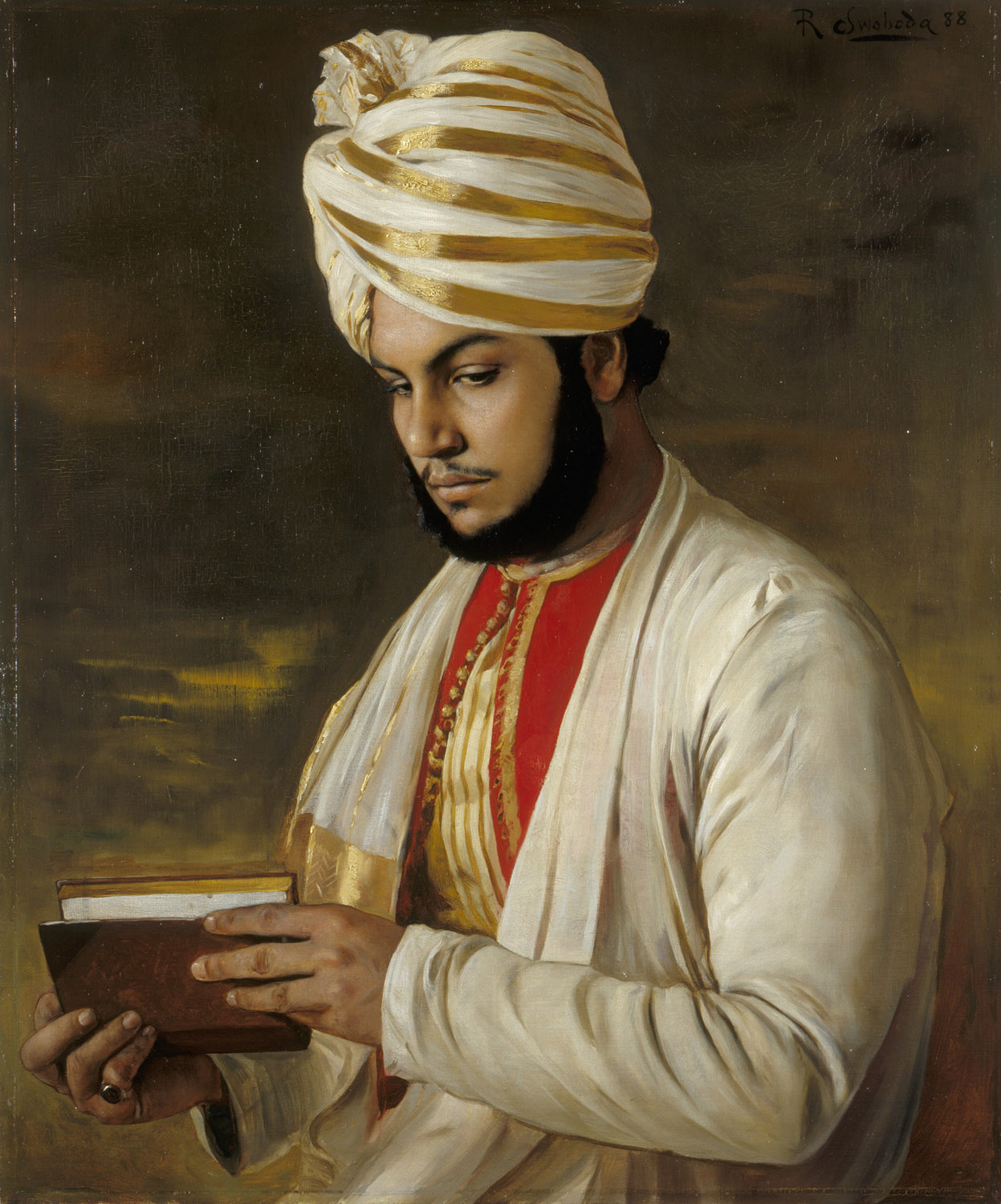
The Munshi (1888)

He studied under his father, Eduard Swoboda, and his uncle Leopold Carl Müller, and traveled with him to Egypt in 1880. His sister was the portrait painter Josefine Swoboda, also well known for her portraits of the British royal family.

In 1886, Queen Victoria commissioned him to paint several of a group of Indian artisans who had been brought to Windsor Castle as part of the Golden Jubilee preparations. Victoria liked the resulting paintings so much that she paid his way to India to paint more of her Indian subjects.

He depicted many of the ordinary people of India in groups of paintings that were mostly small (no more than eight inches high).

While in India, he stayed, part of the time, with John Lockwood Kipling, and met his son Rudyard Kipling. The younger Kipling was unimpressed with Swoboda, writing to a friend about two "Austrian maniacs" who thought they were "almighty" artists aiming to "embrace the whole blazing East".

Upon his return from India, he also painted (in 1888 and 1889) two portraits of Abdul Karim (the Munshi), Victoria's favorite Indian servant.

Most of his Indian paintings hang at Osborne House, once Victoria's residence on the Isle of Wight.

The record price paid for a Swoboda painting was for The Carpet Menders, which sold in 2008 for US$2.6 million at Christie's.

== See also ==
- List of Orientalist artists

== Sources ==
- Constantin von Wurzbach: "Swoboda, Rudolph." In: Biographisches Lexikon des Kaiserthums Oesterreich (Biographical Lexicon of the Empire of Austria). Part 41 Kaiserlich-königliche Hof- und Staatsdruckerei, Vienna 1880, p. 85 (digitalised).
- Herbert Zemen (Ed.): Der Orientmaler Rudolf Swoboda. 1859–1914. Leben und Werk. Privately published, Zemen, Vienna 2004.
- Ch. Gruber: "Swoboda, Rudolf (1859–1914)". In: Österreichisches Biographisches Lexikon 1815–1950 (ÖBL). Vol. 14, Austrian Academy of Sciences, Vienna 2015, ISBN 978-3-7001-7794-4, p. 88 f. (Direct links to "p. 88", "p. 89")
