= Leopold Carl Müller (painter) =

Austrian artist (1834–1892)

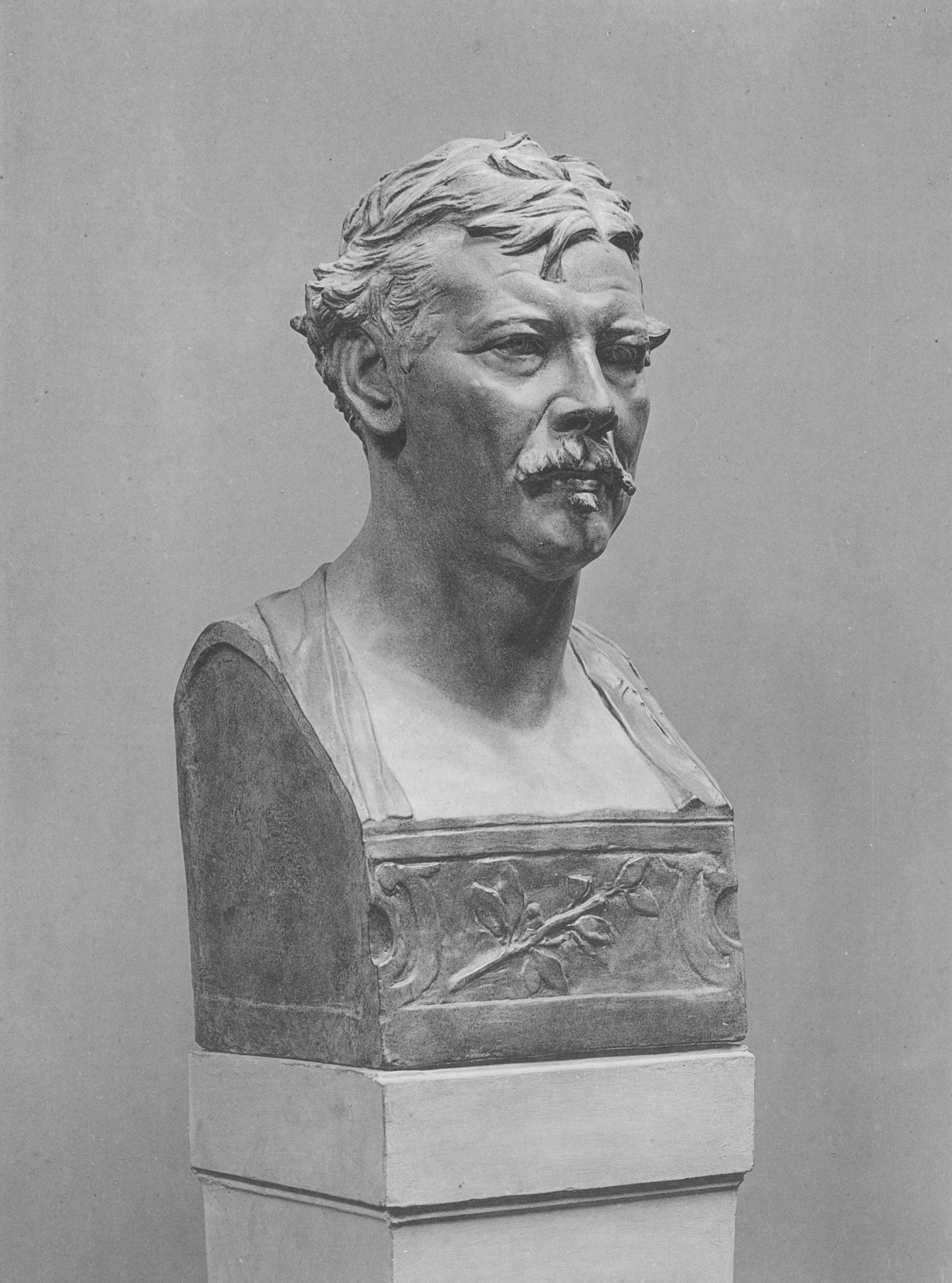
- Leopold Carl Müller; bust by Viktor Tilgner
- Born: 9 December 1834; Dresden, Kingdom of Saxony
- Died: 4 August 1892 (aged 57); Vienna, Austria-Hungary
- Resting place: The Zentralfriedhof, Vienna
- Education: Academy in Vienna
- Known for: Orientalist scenes, landscapes

Leopold Carl Müller (9 December 1834 – 4 August 1892) was an Austrian genre painter noted for his Orientalist works.

== Biography ==
Born in Dresden to Austrian parents, he was a pupil of Karl von Blaas and of Christian Ruben at the Academy in Vienna. Obliged to support his family after his father's death, he worked eight years as an illustrator for the Vienna Figaro. Continuing his studies subsequently, he visited repeatedly Italy and Egypt, and made his name favorably known through a series of scenes from popular life in Italy and Hungary.

In the late 1860s, he visited Paris, where he was inspired by the work of Eugene Fromentin and subsequently turned his attention to the Orientalist genre. In 1877 Müller took a position as professor at the Vienna Academy and later as a rector during 1890–91. Among his pupils were several orientalists such as Ludwig Deutsch, Pavle Paja Jovanović, Jean Discart and Charles Wilda.

His sisters were the painters Marie Müller and Bertha Müller, both well known in Austria for their portrait paintings. The third sister, Josefine, married the Austrian portrait painter Eduard Swoboda, he was the father of the painter Rudolf Swoboda and the portrait painter Josefine Swoboda.

He travelled to Egypt many times throughout his life, often staying there for six months at a time. In 1879, on his fifth visit, he travelled with his nephew and student, Rudolf Swoboda.

He died, aged 57, in Weidlingau, now part of Vienna and is buried at "The Zentralfriedhof" ("Central Cemetery") in Vienna.

== Work ==
He displayed his coloristic talent to greater advantage in oriental subjects, such as Arabian Money-Changers, Pilgrims to Mecca Resting, Bedouins in Camp, Camel Mart, Young Copt Woman (New Pinakothek, Munich). Other works include The Inundation in Vienna, (1862) Old Little Matron and Last Task of the Day (both in the Vienna Museum); and Soldiers in the Thirty Years' War (Prague Gallery). He most well-known work is the Market in Cairo, (1878) which is currently held in the Österreichische Galerie Belvedere in Vienna.

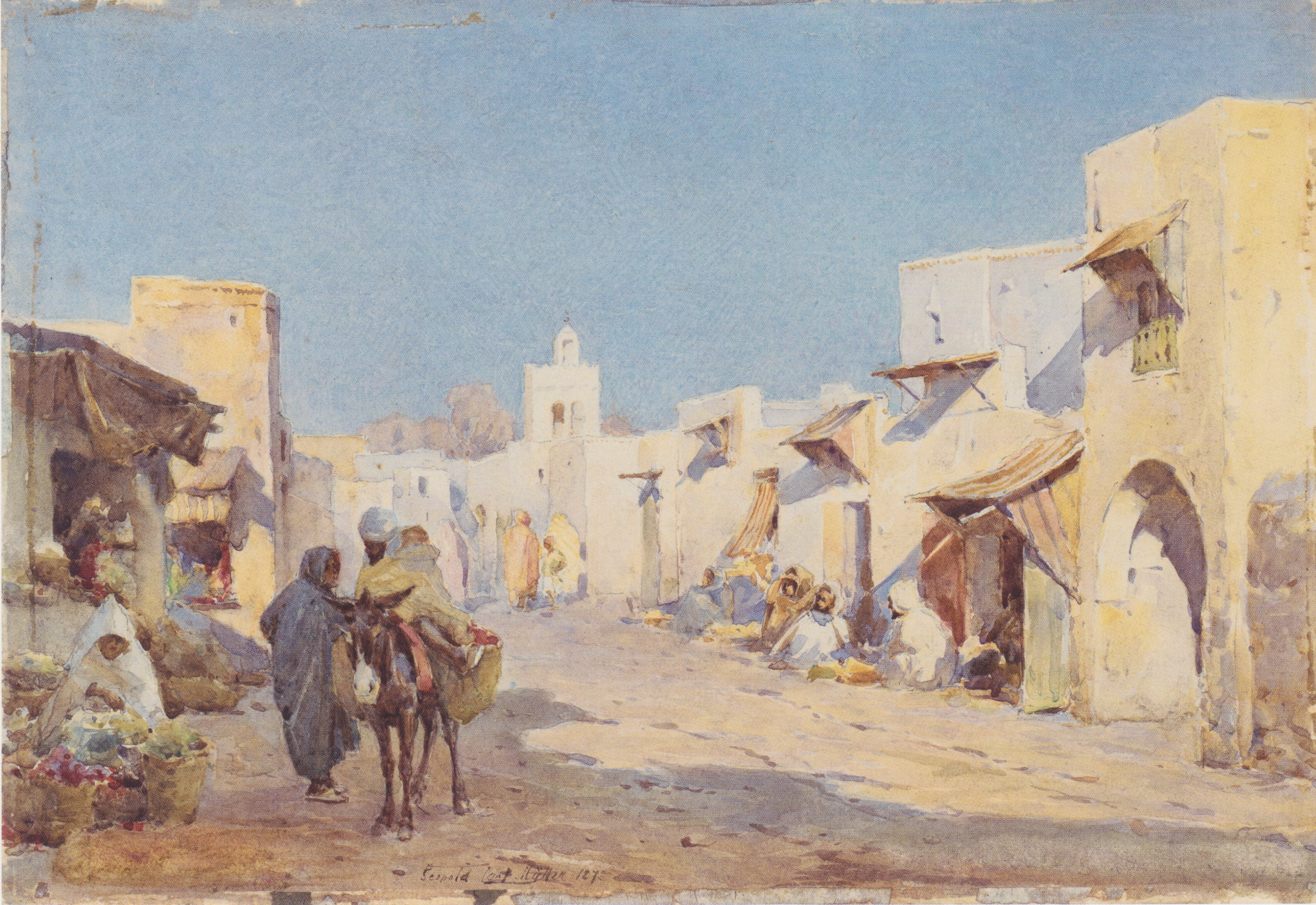
Bedouin Village, 1887

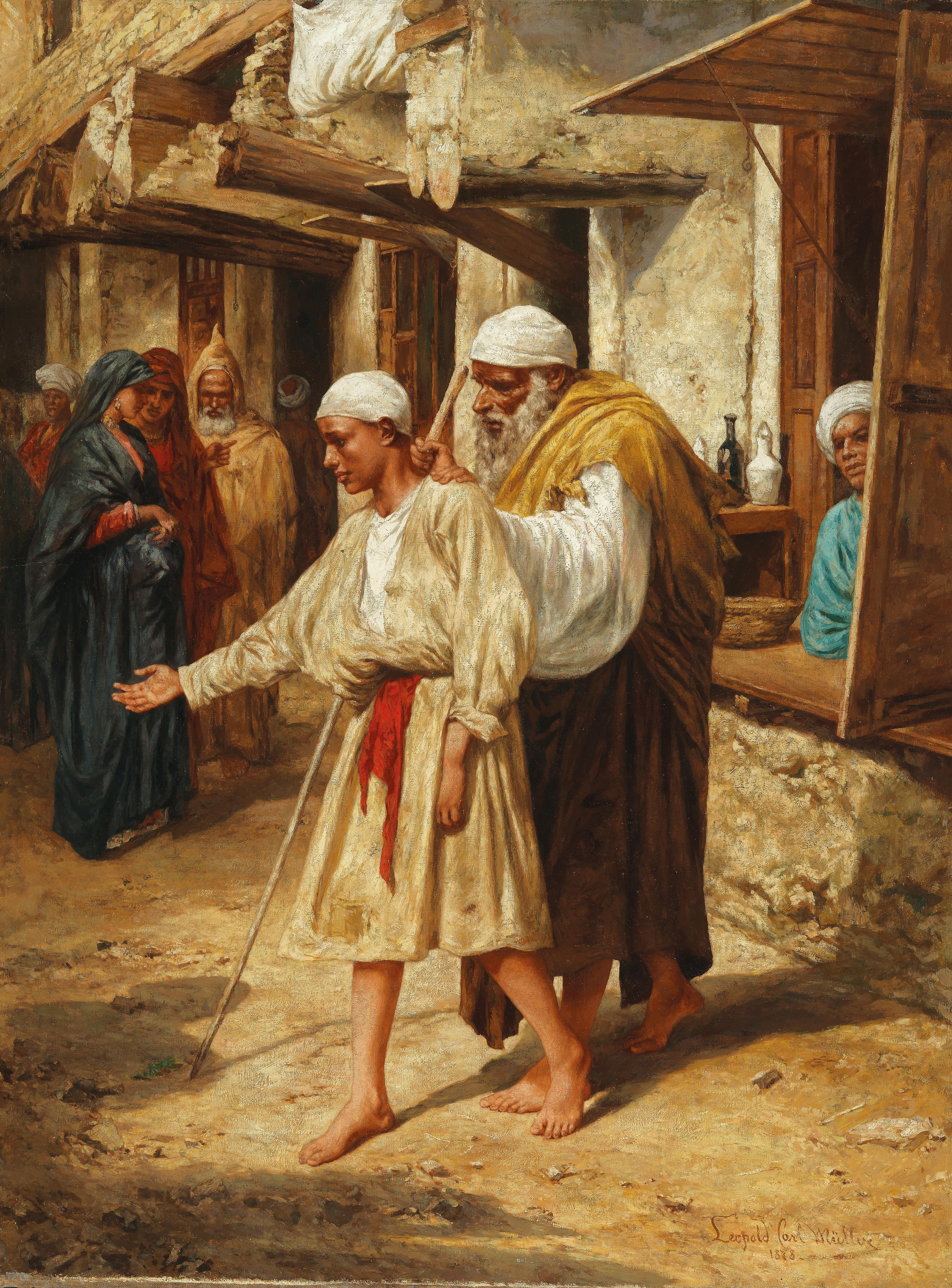
Blind Beggar, 1878

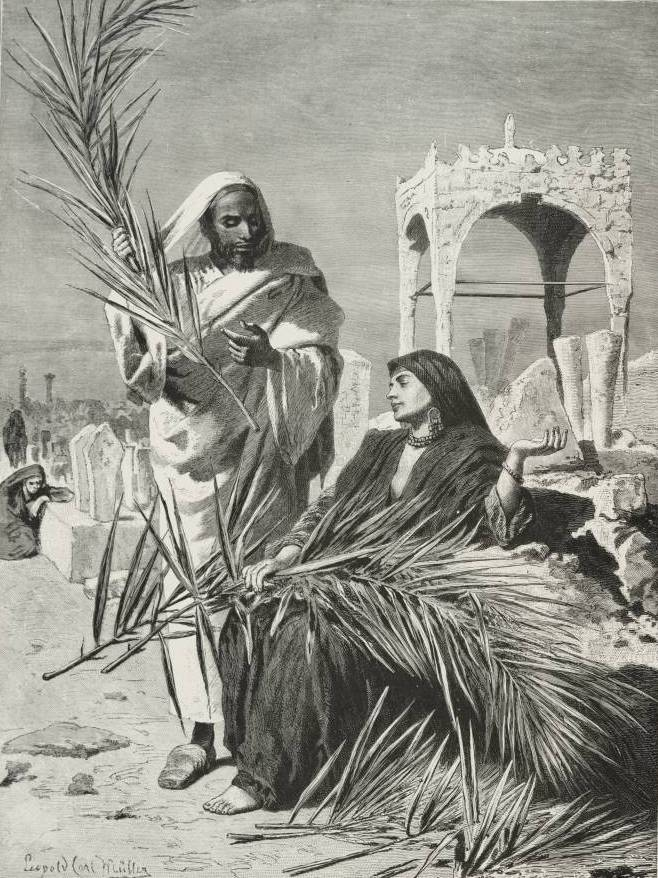
Arab Cemetery, 1878

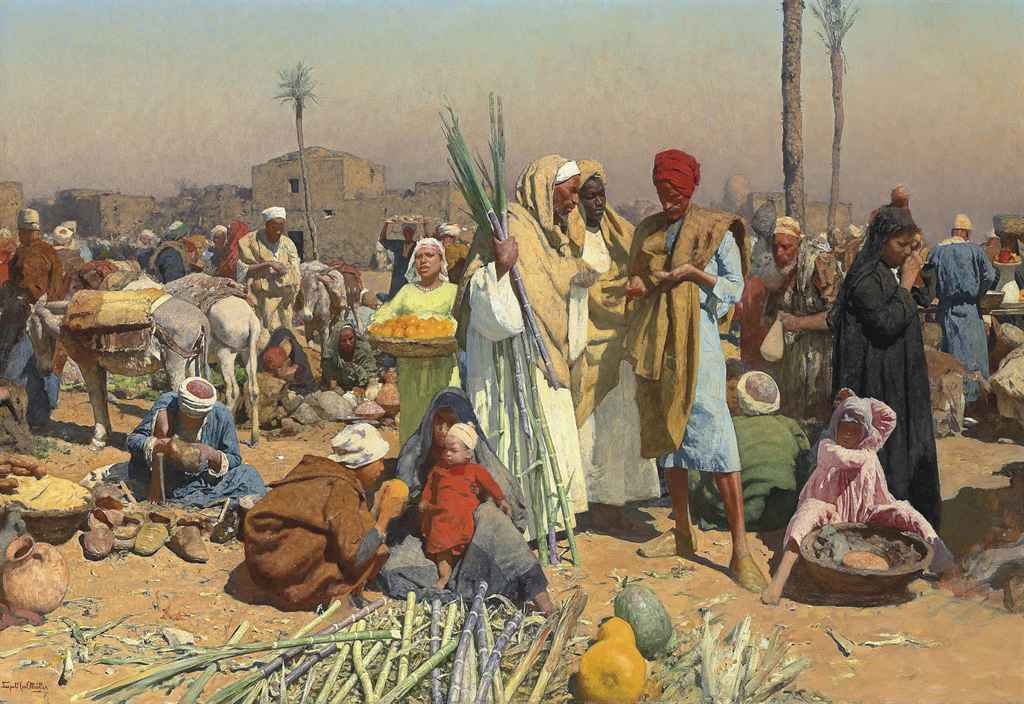
Market in Lower Egypt, date unknown

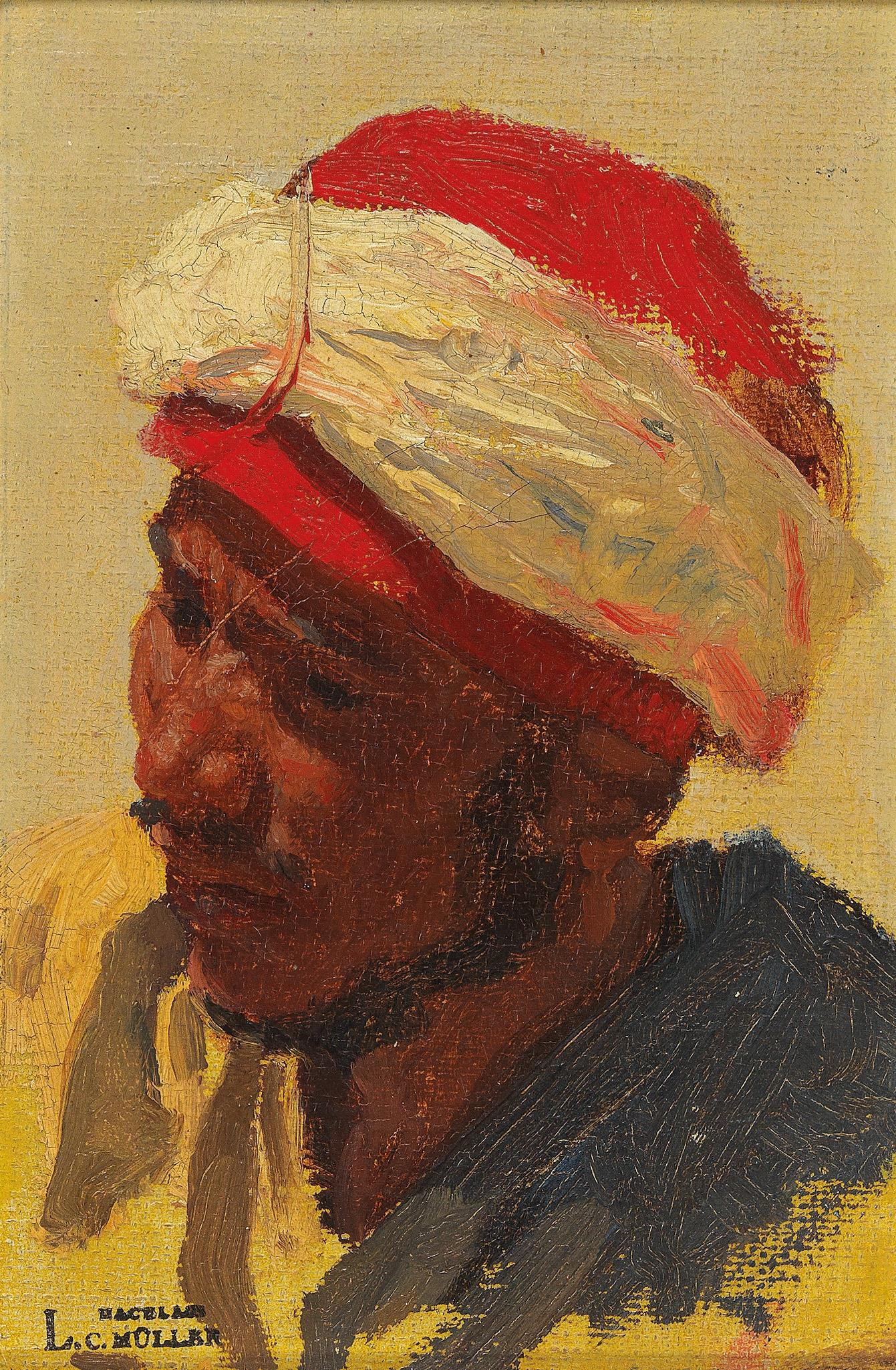
Kopf eines Fellachen, before 1892

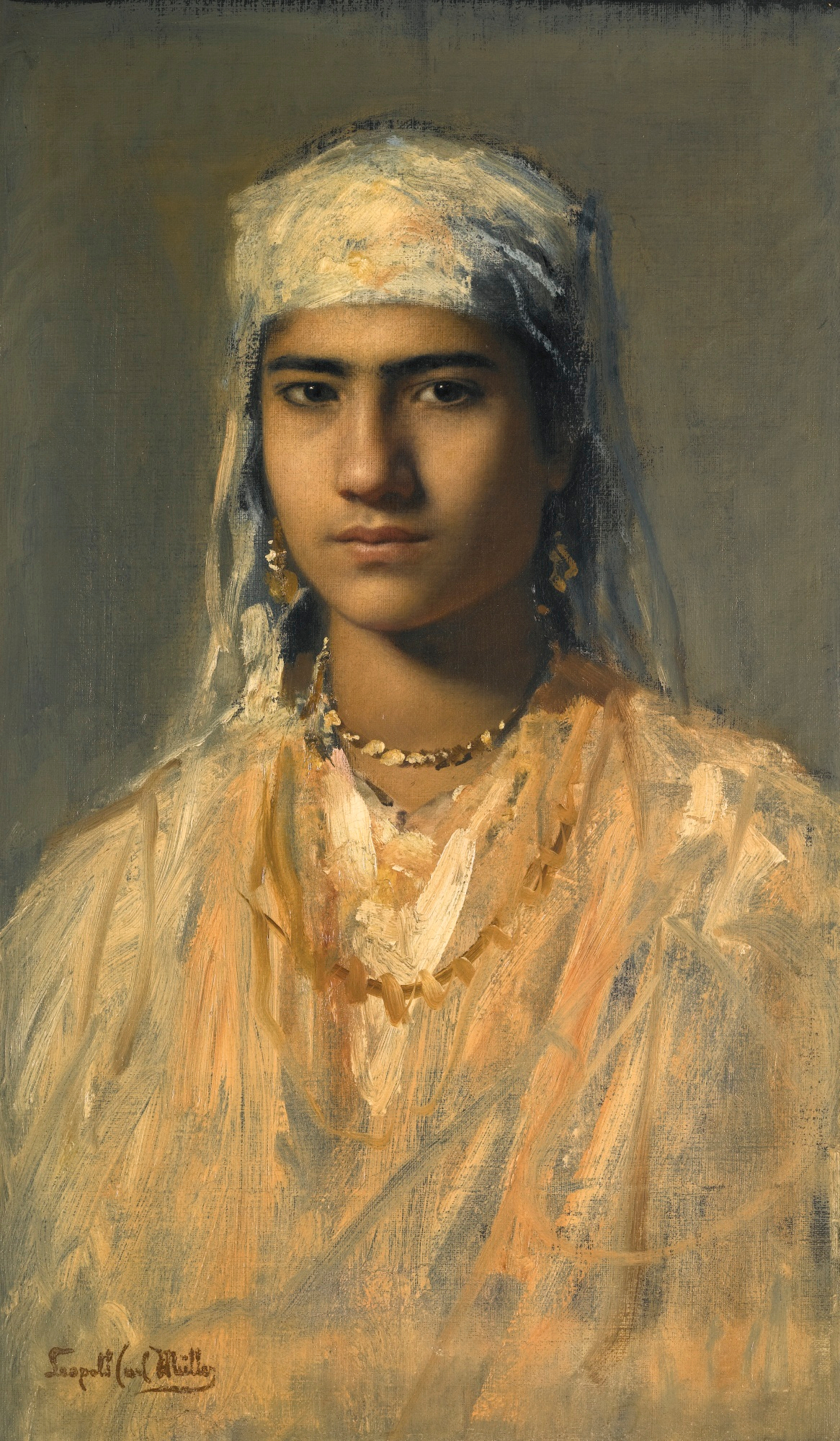
An Egyptian Girl, 1892

== See also ==
- Orientalism
- List of Orientalist artists
