= Josefine Swoboda =

Austrian painter (1861–1924)

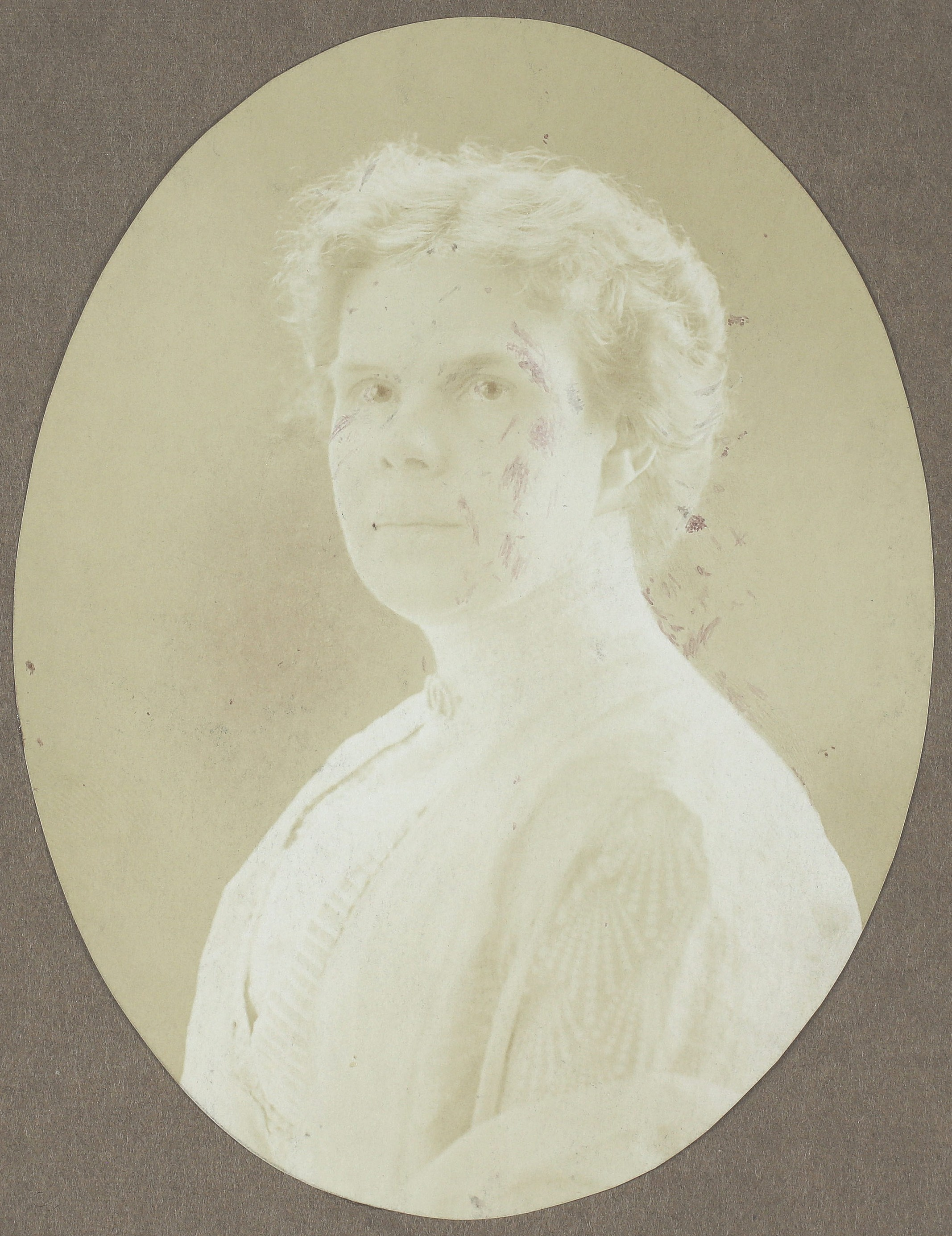
- Photograph, c. 1910
- Born: 29 January 1861; Vienna, Austria
- Died: 27 October 1924 (aged 63); Vienna, Austria
- Occupation: Portrait painter

Josefine Swoboda (29 January 1861 in Vienna – 27 October 1924 in Vienna) was an Austrian portrait painter. She was one of the most active Vienna portraitists.

== Life ==
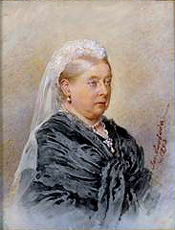
Queen Victoria by Josefine Swoboda (watercolor, 1893)

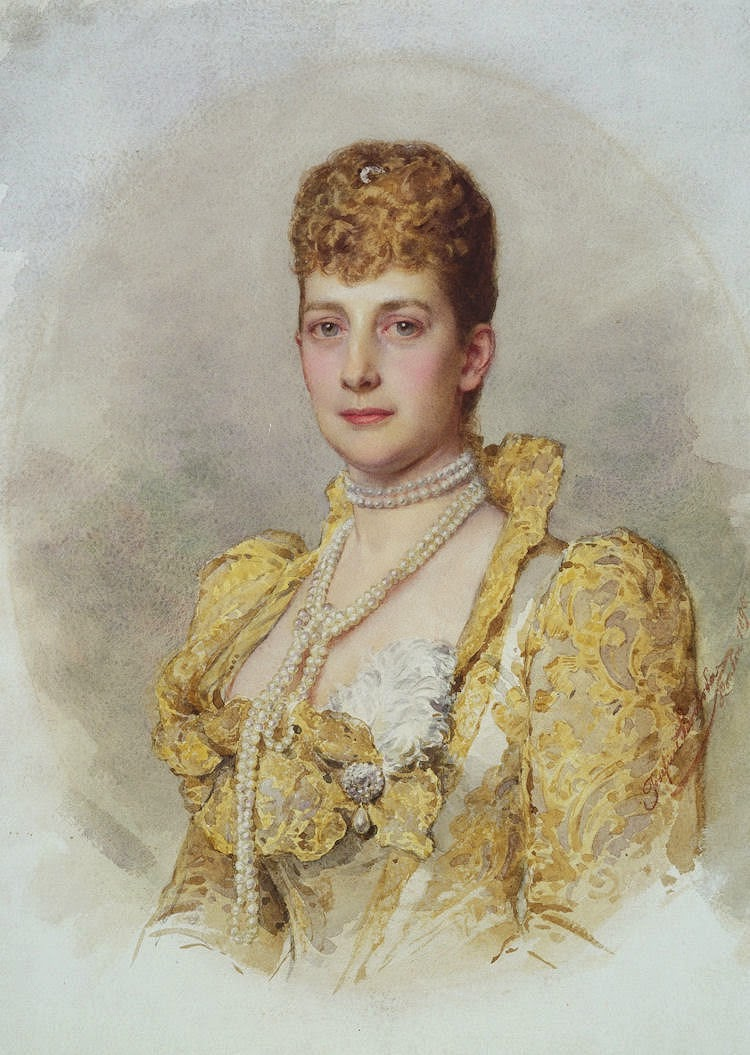
Queen Alexandra when Princess of Wales by Josefine Swoboda (watercolor, 1895)

Josefine Swoboda came from a Vienna family of artists, she was the daughter of the portrait painter Eduard Swoboda (1814-1902) and his second wife Josefine (née Müller; 1839-1906), and sister of the painter Rudolf Swoboda the younger (1859-1914). Her uncles were the landscape and animal painter Rudolf Swoboda (1819-1859) and the orientalist Leopold Carl Müller (1834-1892). After her first painting lessons with her father she studied from 1878 to 1886 as a listener at the k.k. Kunstgewerbeschule which was closely associated with the Österreichisches Museum für Kunst und Industrie (Imperial Royal Austrian Museum of Art and Industry), among others under Ferdinand Laufberger and Julius Victor Berger.

Constantin von Wurzbach wrote in his Biographical Encyclopedia of the Empire of Austria in 1880 about her: "Her excellent work find rapid sale and the only 19-year-old artist entitled to the most beautiful hopes."

Josefine Swoboda's works were mainly watercolors, mostly portraits and (less) genre scenes and still life. From 1886 she was regularly represented in the Vienna Künstlerhaus and participated in exhibitions in Hamburg (1887), Munich and Berlin (1888). Pictures of her were also exhibited at the 1893 Chicago World Exposition. Probably on the recommendation of her brother and Heinrich von Angeli, who worked for the British royal house as a painter, she received the title of court painter of Queen Victoria in 1890. With interruptions and usually only during the summertime she was in England until 1899, portraying the royal family and persons of the court in numerous watercolors. Her paintings are still today in the Royal Collection at Windsor Castle.

Josefine Swoboda also received numerous orders from the Austrian imperial house around Franz Joseph I and other noble houses, which made her to one of the most active Vienna portraitists. From 1902 she was represented in the "Salon Pisko" by the "Gruppe der 8 Künstlerinnen" in their exhibitions "Acht Künstlerinnen und ihre Gäste" (Eight female artists and their guests). Some of her works are in the Vienna Museum as well as in the graphic collection of the Albertina in Vienna. From 1886 she became a member of the "Künstlerhaus", the "Austrian (fine art) Artists' Society" .

== Selected portraits ==
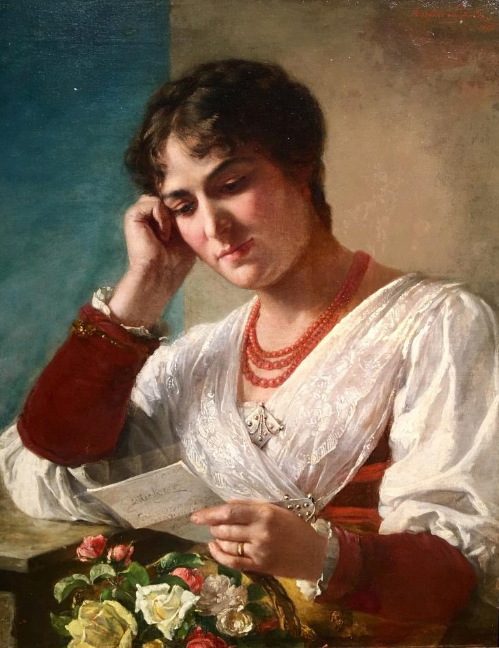
The Letter, 1886

Princess Patricia of Connaught, 1890

Archduchess Maria Anunziata of Austria (1876–1961) and Archduchess Elisabeth Amalie of Austria (1878–1960), 1893
