= Heinrich Peyer =

Austrian painter, born 1816

Heinrich Peyer (1816, Vienna – after 1854) was an Austrian painter. In 1839–1843, he studied at the Academy of Arts in Vienna. He also worked as a landscape painter in Vienna and traveled through the crown lands of the Austro-Hungarian monarchy, including Hungary, Moravia and Upper Austria, and also visited Bavaria and even Volyn. From 1844 to 1854, he showed his works at the Vienna Academy exhibitions at St. Anna and from 1852 to 1854 at the monthly exhibitions of the Austrian Art Union.

Published "Album widoków Wołynia". The rest of his life after 1854 remains unknown. A view of Gorizia is dated "1877".

== Sources ==
- А. Bernatowicz, Peyer Heinrich // Słownik artystów polskich i obcych w Polsce działających (zmarłych przed 1966 r.). Malarze, rzeźbiarze, graficy, T. VII, Warszawa 2003, s. 62.
- Peyer, Heinrich. In: Hans Vollmer (Hrsg.): Allgemeines Lexikon der Bildenden Künstler von der Antike bis zur Gegenwart. Begründet von Ulrich Thieme und Felix Becker. Band 26: Olivier–Pieris. E. A. Seemann, Leipzig 1932, S. 177.
- Constantin von Wurzbach: "Peyer, Heinrich." In: Biographisches Lexikon des Kaiserthums Oesterreich (Biographical Lexicon of the Empire of Austria). Part 22 Kaiserlich-königliche Hof- und Staatsdruckerei, Vienna 1870, p. 157 (digitalised).
- Holaus, Bärbel (Bearb.)/ Hülmbauer, Elisabeth (Bearb.)/ Wöhrer, Claudia (Bearb.): Kunst des 19. Jahrhunderts. Bestandskatalog der Österreichischen Galerie des 19. Jahrhunderts, Bd. 3: L–R, hrsg. v. d. Österreichischen Galerie Belvedere, Wien 1998, S. 189.
- Peyer, Heinrich. In: Emmanuel Bénézit (Begründer); Jacques Busse (Hrsg.): Dictionnaire critique et documentaire des peintres, sculpteurs, dessinateurs et graveurs de tous les temps et de tous les pays. Nouvelle édition, entièrement réfondue [= 4. Auflage]. Gründ, Paris 1999, ISBN 2-7000-3020-6, Band 10, S. 826.
