= Rudolf Swoboda the Elder =

Austrian painter (1819–1859)

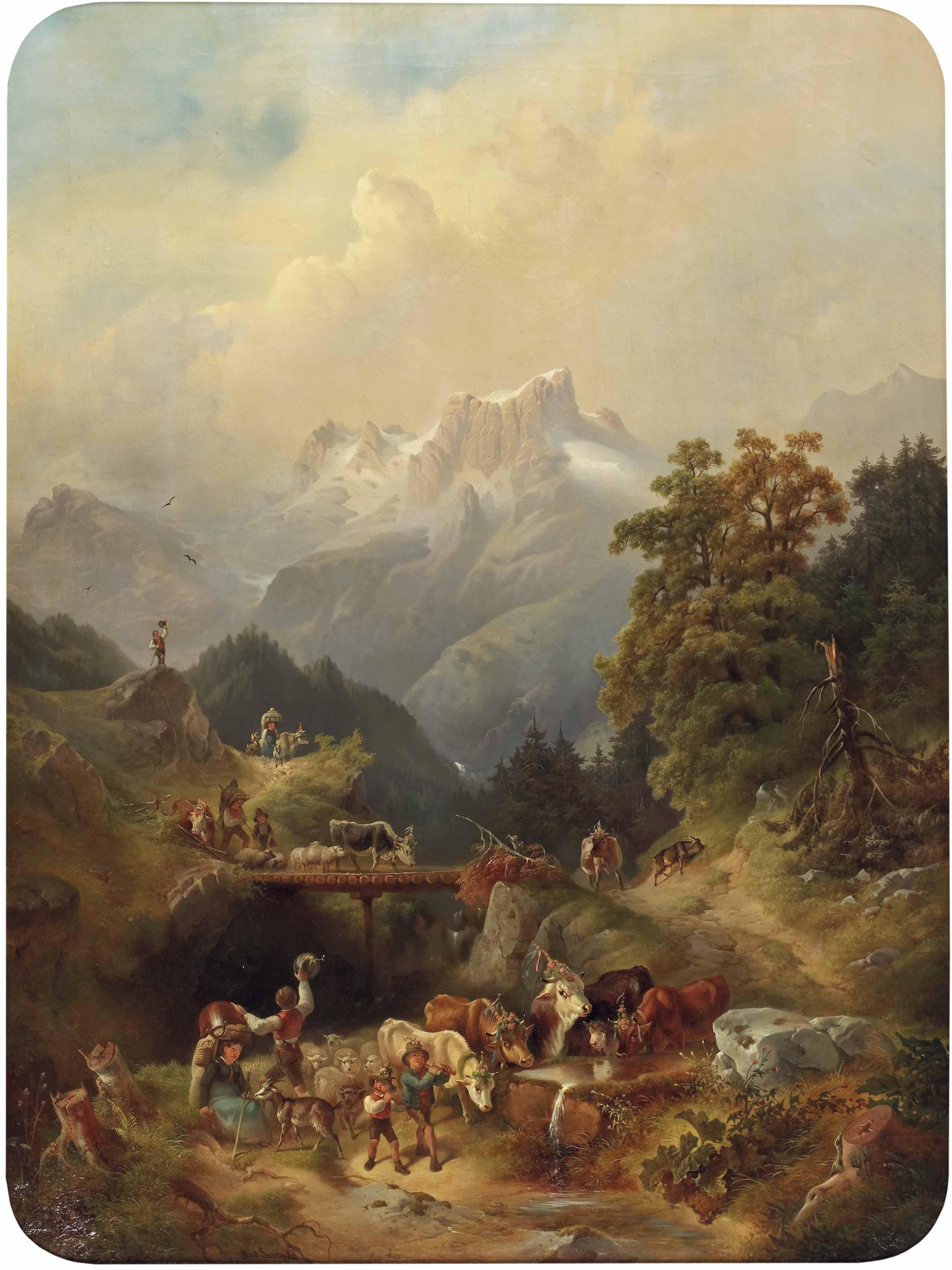
Cattle Drive in the High Mountains

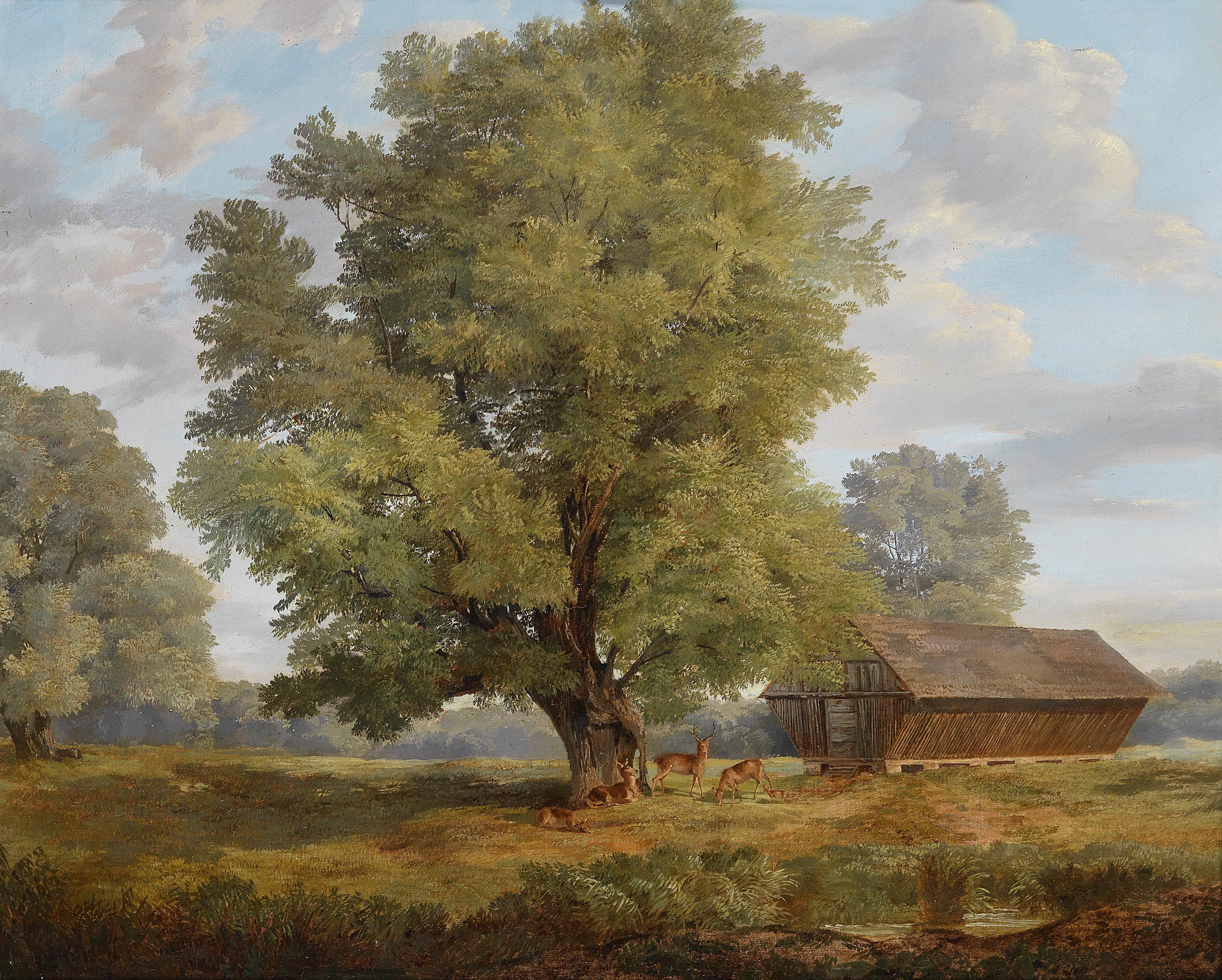
Deers in the Praterau (a forest near Vienna)

Rudolf Swoboda (23 January 1819 – 24 April 1859) was an Austrian landscape and animal painter. He is generally referred to as The Elder to distinguish him from his nephew, Rudolf, who was also an artist.

== Biography ==
Swoboda was born on 23 January 1819 in Vienna, Austrian Empire, into the family of a wool merchant. His older brother, Eduard, also became a painter. He began his artistic training at the Academy of Fine Arts, Vienna, under Joseph Mössmer, and studied landscape painting with Johann Baptist Dallinger von Dalling (1782–1868). After graduating, he made study trips to Italy, France, Germany and Switzerland.

In 1839, he began exhibiting on a regular basis, at the Academy. Later, he would have showings in Pest and Prague. In 1842, he received a large gold medal from the Accademia di Belle Arti di Venezia.

Together with Franz Steinfeld and Ferdinand Georg Waldmüller, he founded the "Österreichischen Kunstvereins" in 1848. That same year, he and Eduard became members of the Academy. In the mid-1850s, he was one of the co-founders of the Albrecht Dürer Association. The majority of his works combine landscapes and animals, with a preference for cattle.

In 1850, he married the actress, Josefine Schlögl (1824–1902), a sister of the writer, Friedrich Schlögl. In the late 1850s, his health, which had been poor since his childhood, worsened and began to hinder his work. He died in Vienna, aged barely forty, on 24 April 1859.

== Sources ==
- "Swoboda, Rudolf". In: Friedrich von Boetticher: Malerwerke des 19. Jahrhunderts. Beitrag zur Kunstgeschichte. Vol. 2/2, Saal–Zwengauer. Fr. v. Boetticher's Verlag, Dresden 1901, pg. 870 (online)
- Hermann Arthur Lier (1894). "Swoboda, Rudolf" . Allgemeine Deutsche Biographie (in German). Vol. 37. Leipzig: Duncker & Humblot. pp. 274–275.
- Constantin von Wurzbach: "Svoboda, Rudolph." In: Biographisches Lexikon des Kaiserthums Oesterreich (Biographical Lexicon of the Empire of Austria). Part 41 Kaiserlich-königliche Hof- und Staatsdruckerei, Vienna 1880, p. 74 (digitalised).
