= Mina Karadžić =

Serbian artist, writer (1828–1894)

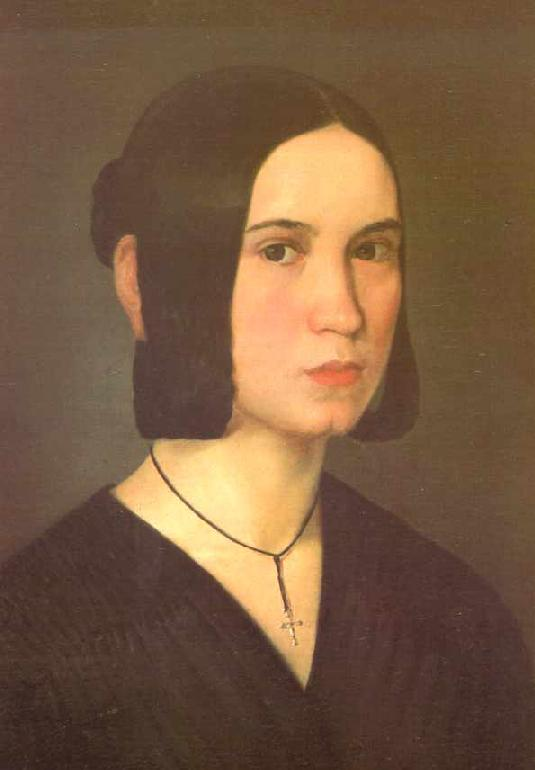
Mina Karadžić's self-portrait

Wilhelmina "Mina" Karadžić-Vukomanović (Serbian Cyrillic: Вилхелмина "Мина" Караџић-Вукомановић; 12 July 1828 – 12 June 1894) was an Austrian-born Serbian painter and writer.

== Biography ==
She was born in Vienna, as the seventh child of Vuk Stefanović Karadžić and the Viennese Ana Maria Kraus. From an early age, she received a comprehensive education, beginning with reading and writing in the German language, and continuing with French, Italian, Serbian, and English. She studied visual arts with the Austrian painter Friedrich Schilcher, as well as in various galleries in Vienna, Venice, Dresden, and Berlin.

In the early 1850s, Karadžić worked on translating a collection of Serbian folk poems into the German language. The collection was finalized and published in 1852 as Gusle, Serbische Nationallieder by Ludwig August von Frankl. In 1854 Karadžić published Volksmarchen der Serben, a German translation of Serbian folk tales and proverbs collected by her father Vuk, with the introduction by Jacob Grimm.

In 1858, she married Aleksa Vukomanović in St Michael's Cathedral in Belgrade. In 1859, she gave birth to their son Janko Vukomanović and lost her husband to illness when the child was three months old.

Karadžić died at the age of 65 in Vienna.

== Paintings ==
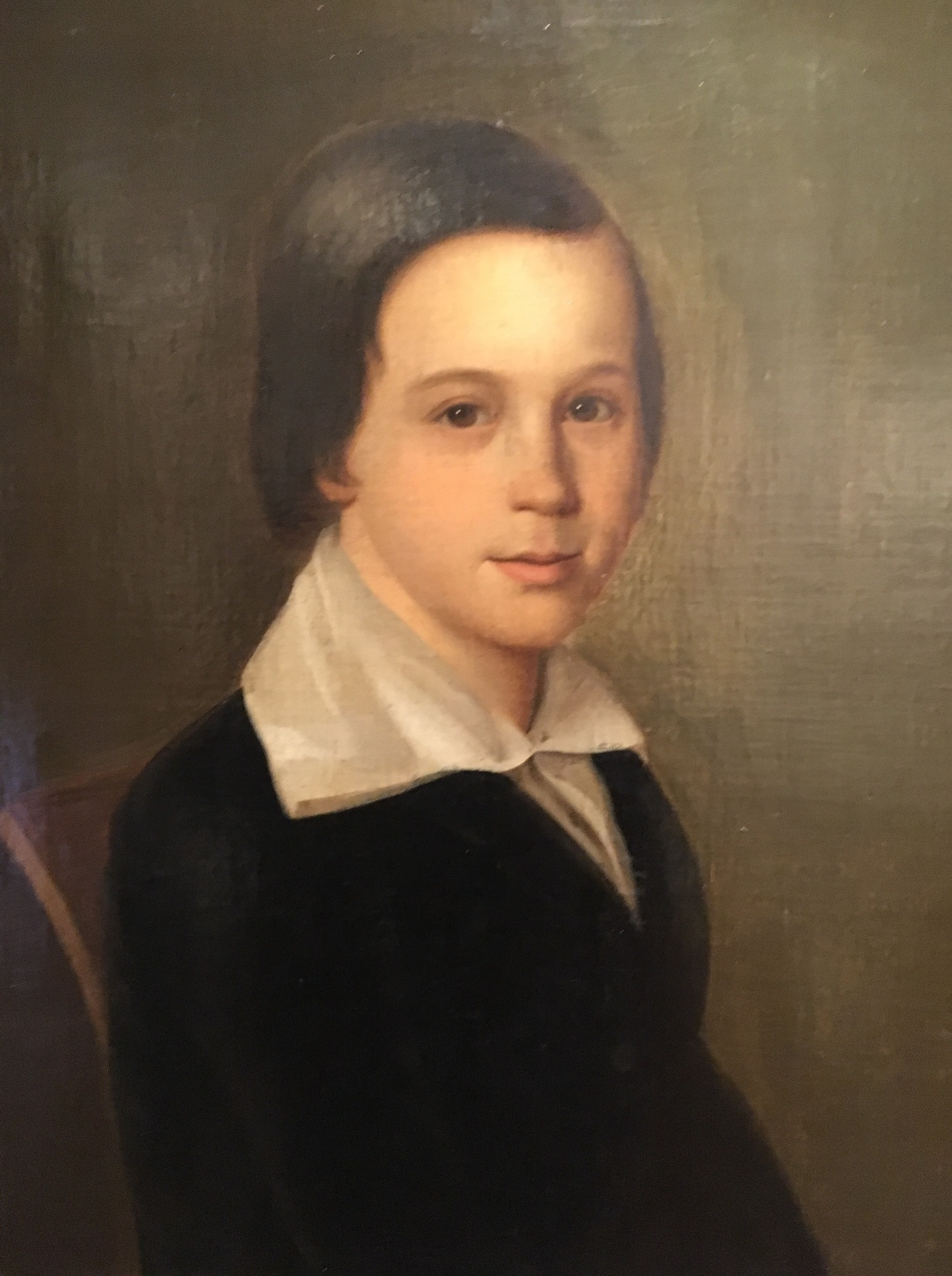
Portrait of Brother Dimitrije

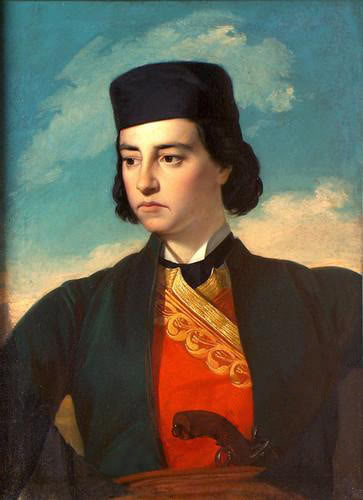
Montenegrin

Mina Karadžić's painting is divided into two periods, the first under the influence of classicism, and the second under the influence of romanticism. Her best known paintings include:

- Self-Portrait
- Portrait of brother Dimitrije
- An old woman with a white cap
- Marko Kraljevic with a mace
- Marko Kraljevic sa šestopercem
- Young black man
- Montenegrin
- Greek hero
- Bosnjak with red Sarough
- Portrait of a girl with a red scarf
- The girl in a plaid dress
- Portrait of a Woman
- An old man with long hair
- The young man with a beard
