= Siegmund L'Allemand =

Austrian painter (1840–1910)

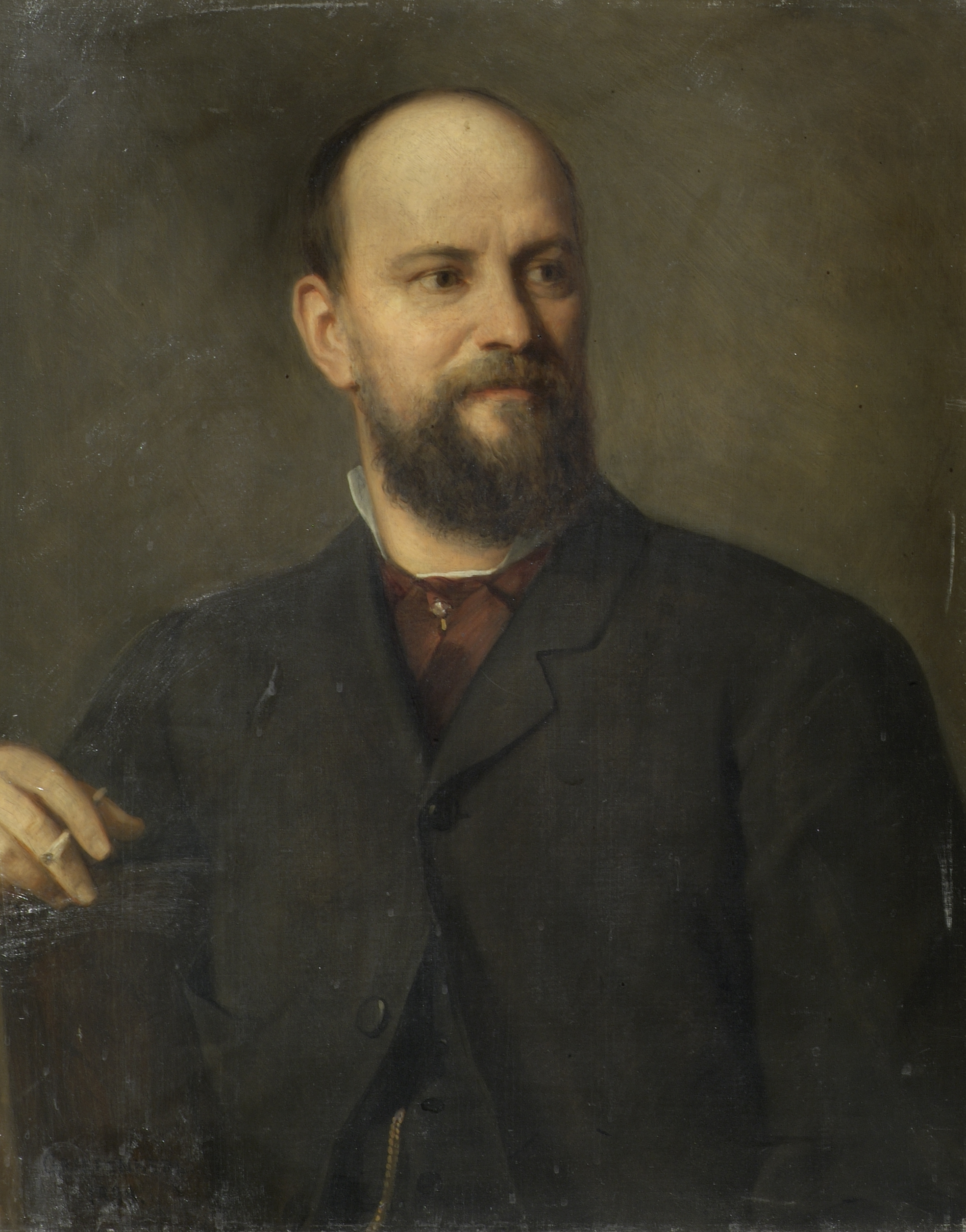
Siegmund L'Allemand; by Christian Griepenkerl (1889)

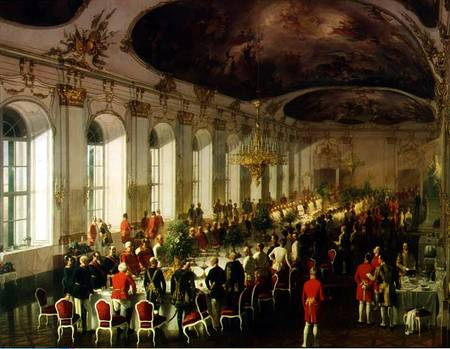
Celebration on the 100th Anniversary of the Military Order of Maria Theresa

Siegmund L’Allemand (8 March 1840, Vienna - 24 December 1910, Vienna) was an Austrian painter, known for history and war scenes, genre works and portraits.

== Biography ==
His father, Thaddäus (1810-1872), was an engraver and his uncle was the history painter, Fritz L’Allemand, who gave him his first lessons. His had his formal studies at the Academy of Fine Arts, Vienna, with Christian Ruben and Karl von Blaas.

In 1864, he became a member of the Vienna Künstlerhaus. Later that year, he served as a battle painter in the Second Schleswig War. Two years later, he served in the same capacity in the Third Italian War of Independence, an offshoot of the Austro-Prussian War, and participated in the Battle of Custoza. His uncle, Fritz, died that same year and Siegmund completed his unfinished paintings.

After 1883, he was a professor at the Academy in Vienna. In October, 1907, he was a member of the Examination Board (chaired by Christian Griepenkerl) that voted to reject Adolf Hitler's application for admission to the school.

He received numerous awards, including a medal at the Exposition Universelle (1867), the Reichel Prize from the Academy (1876) and the "Karl Ludwig Medal" in 1879.

He was interred at the Zentralfriedhof. Many of his works are on display at the Museum of Military History, Vienna; notably a monumental portrait of Ernst Gideon von Laudon that was created for the Exposition Universelle (1878).
