= Ludwig August Frankl von Hochwart =

Austrian writer & poet (1810–1894)

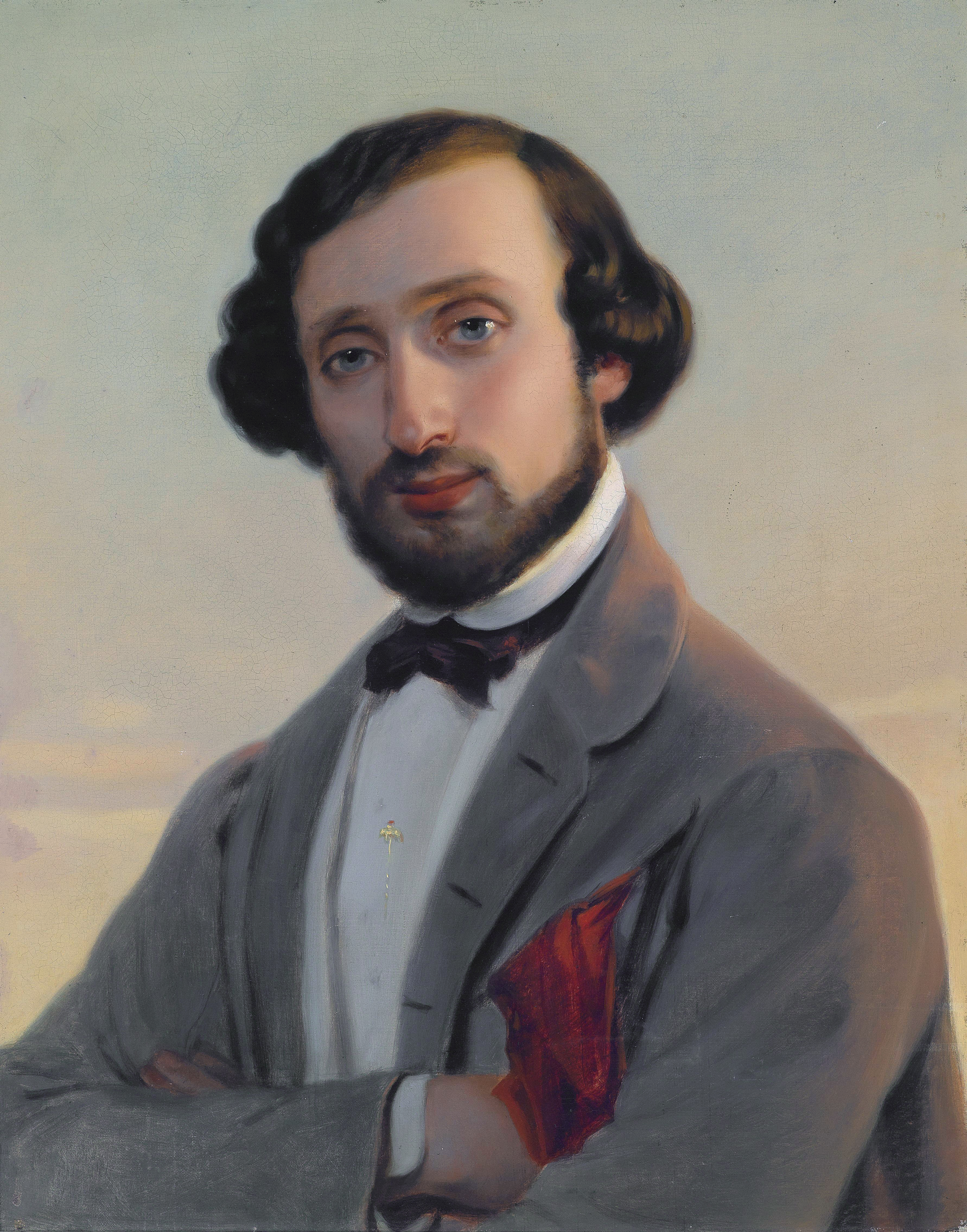
Ludwig August Frankl von Hochwart, portrait by Leopold Pollak

Ludwig August Frankl Ritter von Hochwart (3 February 1810 – 12 March 1894) was a Jewish Bohemian-Austrian writer and poet.

== Biography ==
Frankl was born on 3 February 1810, in Chrast, Bohemia. His brothers were David Bernhard Frankl (1820-1859), merchant and founder of the Commercial Academy in Prague, and Wilhelm Frankl (1821-1893), imperial and municipal councilor who established the Vienna trade schools and the Vienna Central Cemetery.

In 1828, aged eighteen, Frankl began to study medicine at Vienna. In 1837, he graduated as a doctor of medicine from the University of Padua, but he soon gave up his medical career. In September 1838, he was employed as secretary of the Jewish Community in Vienna, and in March 1840 he was appointed as editor of the Oesterreichisches Morgenblatt, a daily newspaper. The same year, he published a collection of poems, and in 1842 the biblical-romantic poem "Rachel". He next founded the weekly magazine Sonntagsblätter ("Sunday Leaves"), which made a decisive contribution to the development of intellectual life in Austria.

Frankl was a friend of Nikolaus Lenau. He also corresponded with Petar II Petrović Njegoš of Montenegro before Njegoš died in 1851.

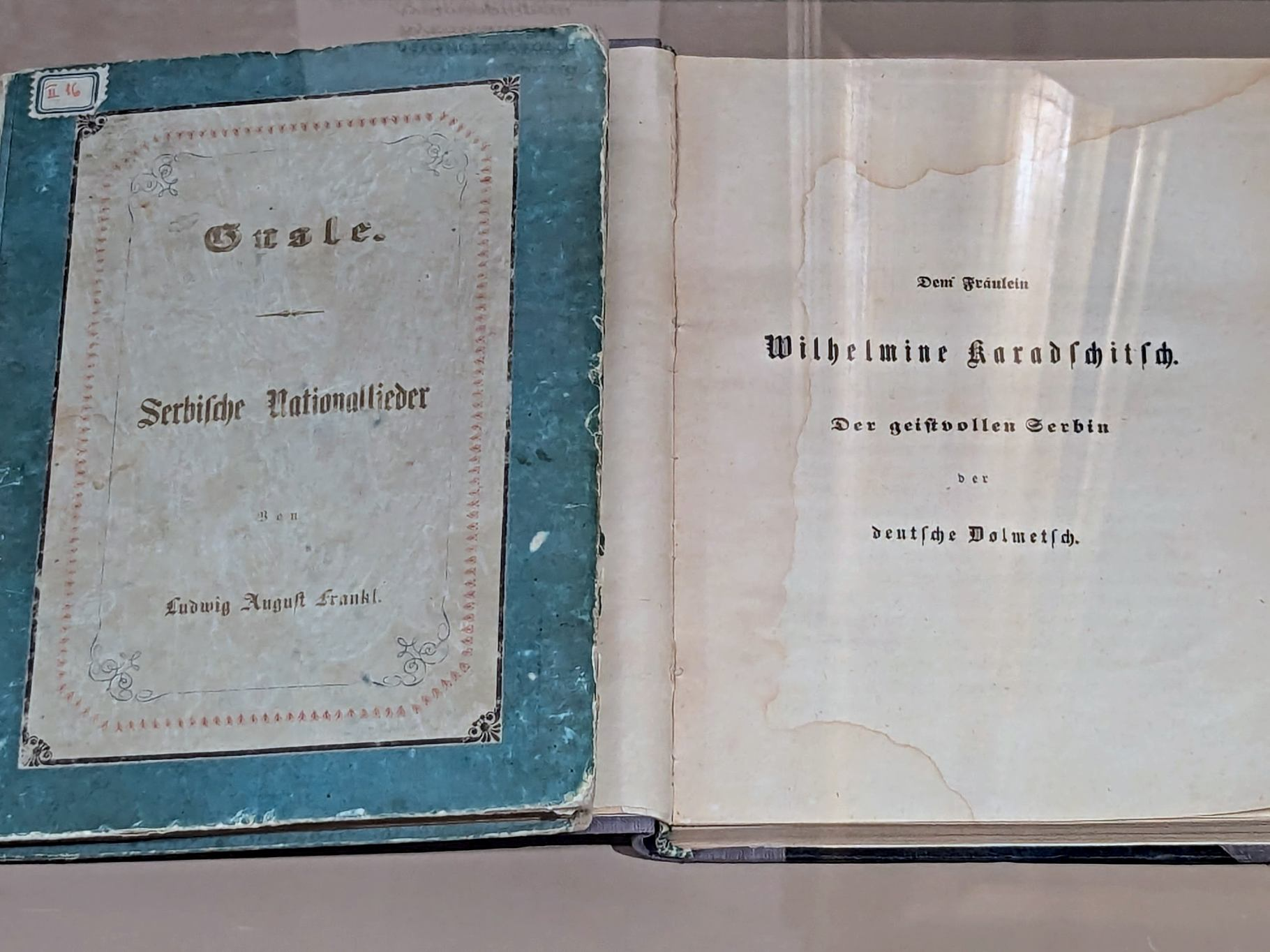
Gusle, Serbische Nationallieder by Ludwig August von Frankl at the Museum of Vuk and Dositej

Frankl's Gusle, Serbische Nationallieder was dedicated to Vuk Karadžić's daughter Mina in 1852. The goal was to present some of the Serbian folk songs, which Vuk collected, in German language for the first time. Mina Karadžić did some translation herself, but left the final portion of the work to Frankl, as he took the greatest pains to reproduce in German the metrical effect of the Serbian original.

On 10 November 1876, Frankl was raised to the hereditary Austrian nobility with the title "Ritter von Hochwart", in recognition of his founding an institution for the blind in Vienna. In 1880, he was made an honorary citizen of Vienna. He was also made an honorary citizen of Chrast and Genoa, and of Jerusalem and Tiberias in Palestine.

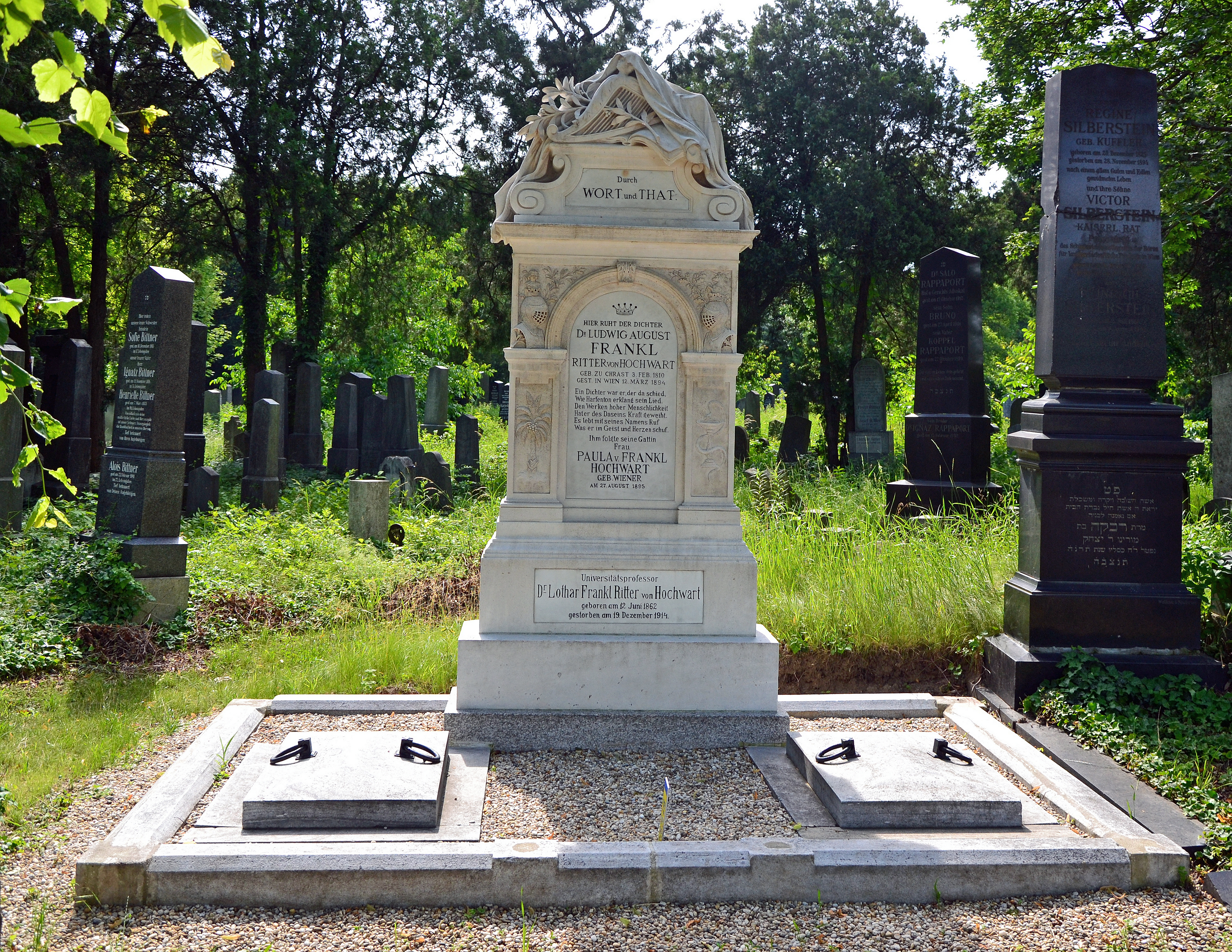
Frankl's grave in the Vienna Central Cemetery names him as Dr Ludwig August Frankl Ritter von Hochwart

Frankl died on 12 March 1894, in Vienna.

== Family ==
Ludwig August Frankl was married to Paula Wiener (born 1834), the daughter of Prague merchant and banker Hermann Wiener (died 1874) and his wife Therese von Lämel; their son was the neurologist Lothar von Frankl-Hochwart (1862-1914). A nephew of his was musicologist Paul Josef Frankl (1892-1976) who was professor at the Academy of Music in Vienna. He was a distant relative of Talmud scholar and rabbi Zecharias Frankel.
