= Friedrich Schilcher =

Austrian painter (1811–1881)

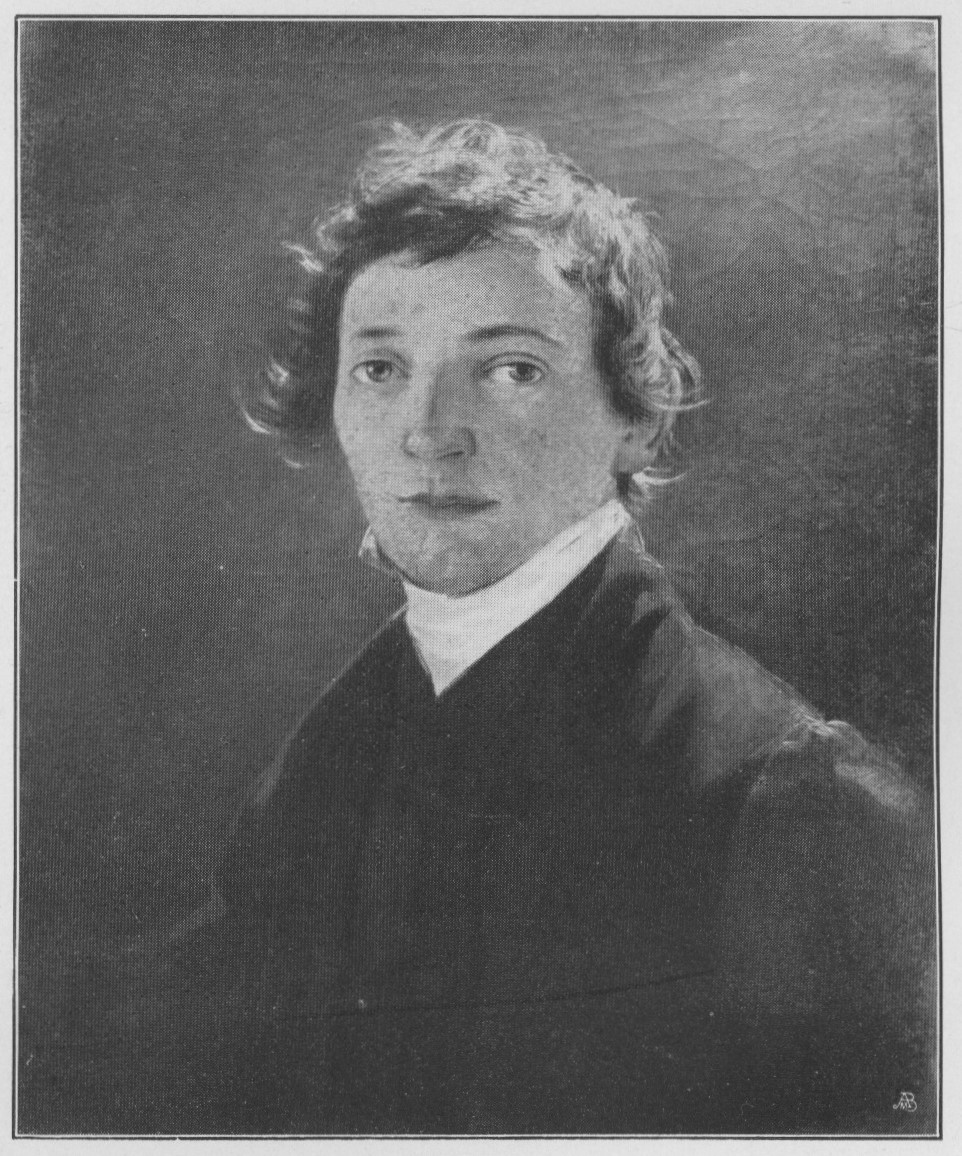
- Portrait of Friedrich Schilcher by Friedrich von Amerling
- Born: 1 September 1811; Vienna, Austria
- Died: 6 May 1881 (aged 69); Vienna, Austria
- Occupation: Painter

Friedrich Schilcher (1811 – 1881) was an Austrian portrait, genre, and history painter, and decorative designer.

Schilcher was born in Vienna on 1 September 1811. He studied at the Vienna Academy, undertook study trips to Hungary and Transylvania, and became the president of Vienna Künstlerhaus. He died on 6 May 1881 at Unterdöbling in Vienna, and was buried in the Vienna Central Cemetery. In 1975 the Schilchergasse (street), in Vienna's 14th borough of Penzing, was named after him.

== Works ==
- restoration of ceiling frescoes by Marcantonio Chiarini in the Winter Palace of Prince Eugene, Innere Stadt, Vienna (1841)
- restoration of ceiling frescoes in the Great Boardroom of Palais Niederösterreich, Vienna
- stage curtain for the Hungarian National Theatre, Budapest
- altarpiece for the Ladislauskirche, Oradea, Romania
- Cardinal virtues, frescoes in the prelate courtyard of Melk Abbey (1852)
- Glory of Saint Benedict, ceiling painting for the entrance hall at Melk Abbey (1852)
- The circular dance of angels, painting behind the high altar at St Joseph's Church in Kahlenberg, Vienna (1852)
- painting for the Finsterle family mausoleum in the parish cemetery at Kahlenbergerdorf in Döbling, Vienna
- decoration in the parish church of Leobersdorf (1859-1862)
- portrait of Franz Joseph I of Austria of Austria (1860), oil on canvas, 123 × 95 cm
- ceiling painting in the 'Schubert Room' at the Palais Dumba, Vienna, depicting aspects of Schubert's work, for Nikolaus Dumba
- supraport frescoes for the Palais Schwarzenberg, Vienna
- figurative painting for the curtain of the Theater an der Wien (1864)
- Allegory of Austria, fresco in the Great Dining Room of the Austria Classic Hotel Wien, Vienna (destroyed 1945)
- portrait of Johann II, Prince of Liechtenstein (Collection Liechtenstein, inv. No. GE 1841), oil on canvas, 55.4 × 47.4 cm

Further paintings are in the Vienna Museum and the Academy of Fine Arts Vienna.

== Bibliography ==
- Constantin von Wurzbach: "Schilcher, Friedrich." In: Biographisches Lexikon des Kaiserthums Oesterreich (Biographical Lexicon of the Empire of Austria). Part 29 Kaiserlich-königliche Hof- und Staatsdruckerei, Vienna 1875, p. 312–314 (digitalised).
