= Christian Ruben =

German painter (1805–1875)

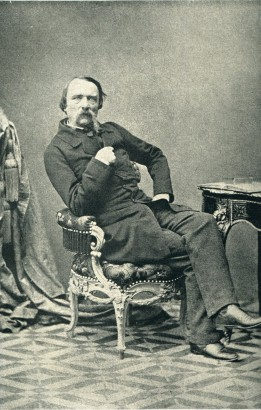

Christoph Christian Ruben (November 30, 1805 – July 9, 1875) was a German painter.

Born in Trier, Ruben studied in Düsseldorf under Peter von Cornelius from 1823, and in 1826 settled in Munich, where he worked on the designs for the new stained glass windows for the Regensburg Cathedral and for a church in Auer. In 1836 he worked on designs for the decoration of Hohenschwangau Castle, and produced oil paintings as well. In 1841, he was appointed director at the Academy of Fine Arts in Prague, where he decorated the belvedere with wall paintings. He also painted a hall for the Prince of Salm and three altarpieces for the church in Turnau (modern-day Turnov, Czech Republic). From 1852 to 1872 he was director at the Academy of Fine Arts Vienna, where he died in 1875. One of his sons, Franz Ruben, was also a painter.

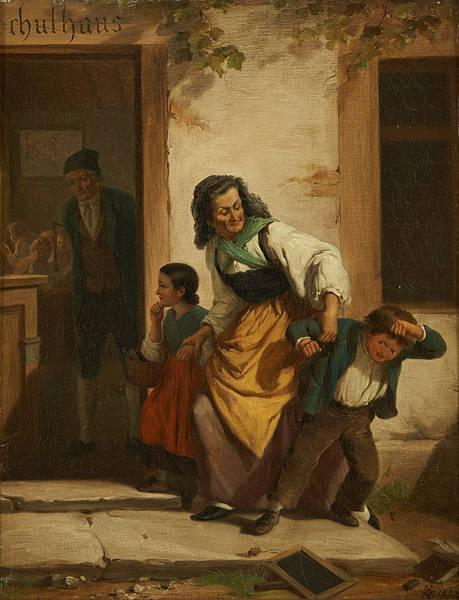
The Truant's Return to School

Ruben's pupils included Jaroslav Čermák and Karel Javůrek.
