= Biographisches Lexikon des Kaiserthums Oesterreich =

60-volume biographical work by Constant von Wurzbach, published between 1856 and 1891

Biographisches Lexikon des Kaiserthums Oesterreich (English, Biographical Encyclopedia of the Austrian Empire) (abbreviated Wurzbach from the author's surname) is a 60-volume work, edited and published by Constantin von Wurzbach, containing about 24,254 critical biographies of notable personages in every walk of life and from all parts of the Austro-Hungarian monarchy who were born, lived or worked there during the period 1750–1850.

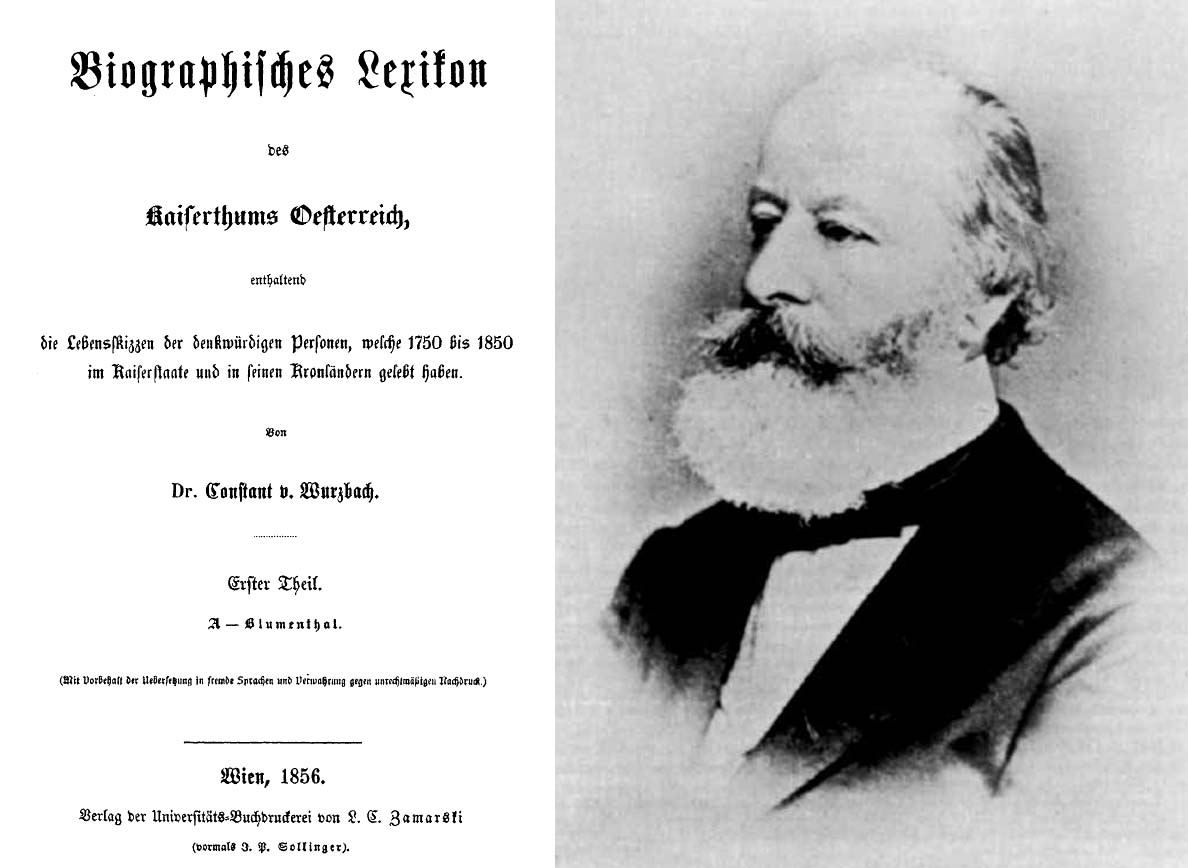
Endpapers to Biographisches Lexikon des Kaiserthums Österreich

== See also ==
- Österreichisches Biographisches Lexikon 1815–1950 (ÖBL)
