= Constant von Wurzbach =

Austrian lexicographer (1818–1893)

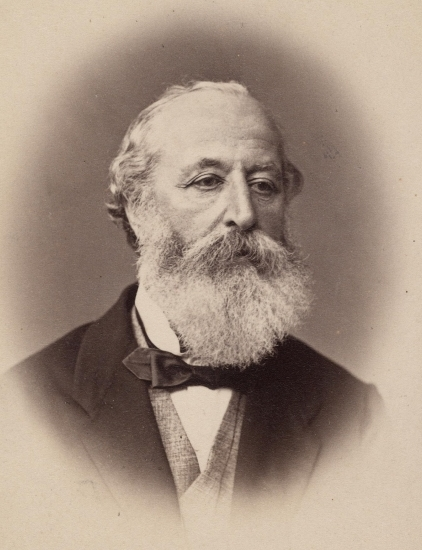
- Title page of Biographisches Lexikon des Kaiserthums Österreich with Wurzbach's correct first name Constant
- Born: 11 April 1818; Ljubljana
- Died: August 7, 1893 (aged 75); Berchtesgaden
- Alma mater: University of Graz
- Occupation: Lexicographer, writer, biographer, bibliographer, opinion writer, official, librarian, literary historian, beamter, officer, historian
- Spouse(s): Caroline von Wurzbach-Tannenberg, Antonie von Wurzbach-Tannenberg
- Rank: Unterleutnant (1841–)
- Titles: Ritter (1874–)

Constantin Wurzbach Ritter von Tannenberg (11 April 1818 – 17 August 1893) was an Austrian biographer, lexicographer and author.

== Biography ==
He was born in Laibach, Carniola (present-day Ljubljana, Slovenia).He later went on to complete a course in philosophy and published poetry in local periodicals, inspired by the work of Nikolaus Lenau and Anastasius Grün.

At the request of his father, he began studying jurisprudence at Graz, which he, however, abandoned after two years. Instead, he joined the Austrian army and served in a Galician infantry regiment at Cracow from 1837. As a cadet, he continued to publish poems under the pseudonym W. Constant. In 1841 he was promoted to the rank of second lieutenant (Unterleutnant) and transferred to Lemberg (Lviv). At the same time, he studied philosophy at the Lemberg University and in 1843 became the first active officer in the Austrian army to obtain a doctorate.

By the end of the year, Wurzbach left the army and took up an appointment at the Lemberg University library. In 1849 he was appointed librarian in the Ministry of the Interior at Vienna, and subsequently secretary in the Ministry of State.

Wurzbach died in Berchtesgaden, Bavaria. He was the father of Alfred von Wurzbach, an art critic.

== Works ==
He is best known for:

- Bibliographisch-statistische Uebersicht der Litteratur des österreichischen Kaiserstaates (Bibliographic-statistical overview of the literature of the Austrian Empire, 1856)
- Biographisches lexikon des kaiserthums Oesterreich, enthaltend die lebensskizzen der denkwürdigen personen, welche seit 1750 in den österreichischen kronländern geboren wurden oder darin gelebt und gewirkt haben [Biographical Dictionary of the Austrian Empire, containing biographical sketches of notable persons who were born in the Austrian Crown Lands since 1750, or who lived and worked therein] (in German). Vienna: K. K. Hof- und staatsdruckerie. LCCN 08030373 – via HathiTrust. A unique publication on a gigantic scale, sixty volumes published 1856–91, containing about 25,000 critical biographies of notable personages in every walk of life and from all parts of the Austro-Hungarian monarchy. The work was reprinted in 1966 by Johnson Reprint. LCCN 79-235456

His other writings include:

- Die Volkslieder der Polen und Ruthenen (Folk songs of Poland and the Eastern Slavs, 1846)
- Die Sprichwörter der Polen historisch erläutert, mit Hinblick auf die eigenthümlichsten der Lithauer, Ruthenen, Serben und Slovenen und verglichen mit ähnlichen anderer Nationen; mit beigefügten Originalen. Ein Beitrag zur kenntniss slavischer Culturzustände [The Proverbs of the Poles Historically Explained, with Reference to the Most Distinctive Among the Lithuanians, Ruthenians, Serbs, and Slovenes, and Compared with Similar Ones from Other Nations; with Appended Originals. A Contribution to the Understanding of Slavic Cultural Conditions] (in German). Vienna: Pfautsch & Voss. 1852. LCCN 49055580 – via HathiTrust.
- Die Kirchen der Stadt Krakau; eine Monographie zur Geschichte und Kirchengeschichte des einstigen Königreichs Polen [The Churches of the City of Kraków: A Monograph on the History and Ecclesiastical History of the Former Kingdom of Poland] (in German). Vienna: Mechitharisten-Congregation. 1853 – via HathiTrust.
- Das Schillerbuch [The Schiller Book] (in German). Vienna: K. K. Hof- und staatsdruckerie. 1859. LCCN 18015820 – via HathiTrust.
- Joseph Haydn und sein Bruder Michael: Zwei biobibliographische Künstler-Skizzen [Joseph Haydn and His Brother Michael: Two Bio-bibliographical Sketches of Artists] (in German). Vienna: Aus der Kaiserlich-königlichen Hof- und Staatsdruckerei. 1861. LCCN 09006779 – via HathiTrust.
- Historische Wörter, Sprichwörter und Redensarten: in erläuterungen [Historical words, proverbs and idioms: with explanations] (in German). Prague: J. L. Kober. 1863 – via HathiTrust.
- Glimpf und Schimpf in Spruch und Wort : sprach- und sittengeschichtliche Aphorismen [Praise and Censure in Saying and Word: Aphorisms on the History of Language and Manners]. Vienna: R. Lechner. 1864 – via HathiTrust.
- Franz Grillparzer, Geboren den 15 jänner 1791, Gestorben den 21 jänner 1872 [Franz Grillparzer, Born January 15, 1791, Died January 21, 1872] (in German). Vienna: Verlag der E. Hügel'schen buchhandlung. 1872 – via HathiTrust.
- Ein Madonnen-Maler unserer Zeit (Eduard Steinle); biographische Studie [A Painter of Madonnas of Our Time (Eduard Steinle): A Biographical Study] (in German). Vienna: Verlag der Manz'schen k. k. Hofverlags- und Universitäts-Buchhandlung. 1879 – via HathiTrust.
- Feldmarschall Erzherzog Karl (Fieldmarshal Archduke Karl, 1880)
