= Klagenfurt =

Klagenfurt am Wörthersee Celovec (Slovene)
- Statutory city
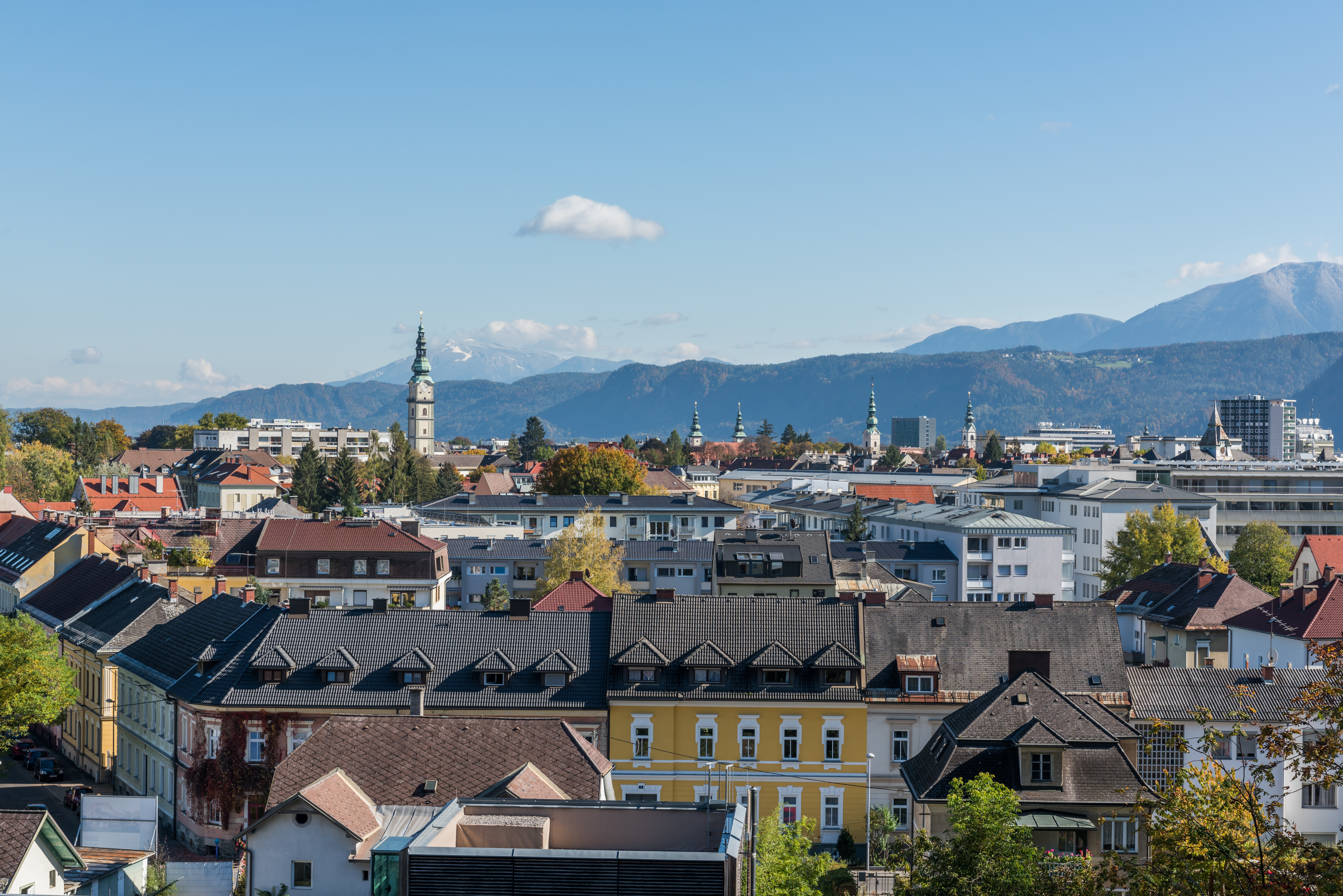
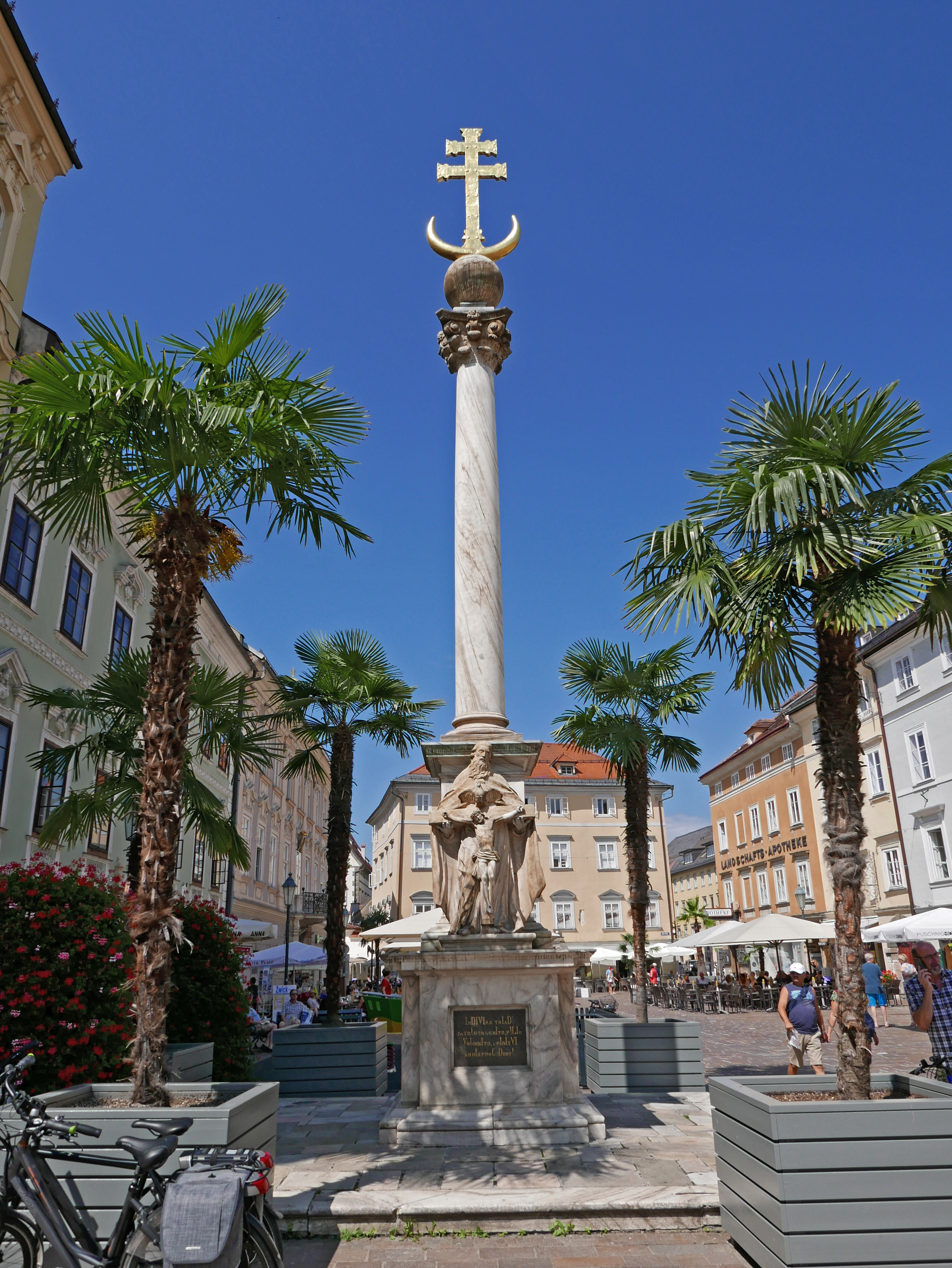
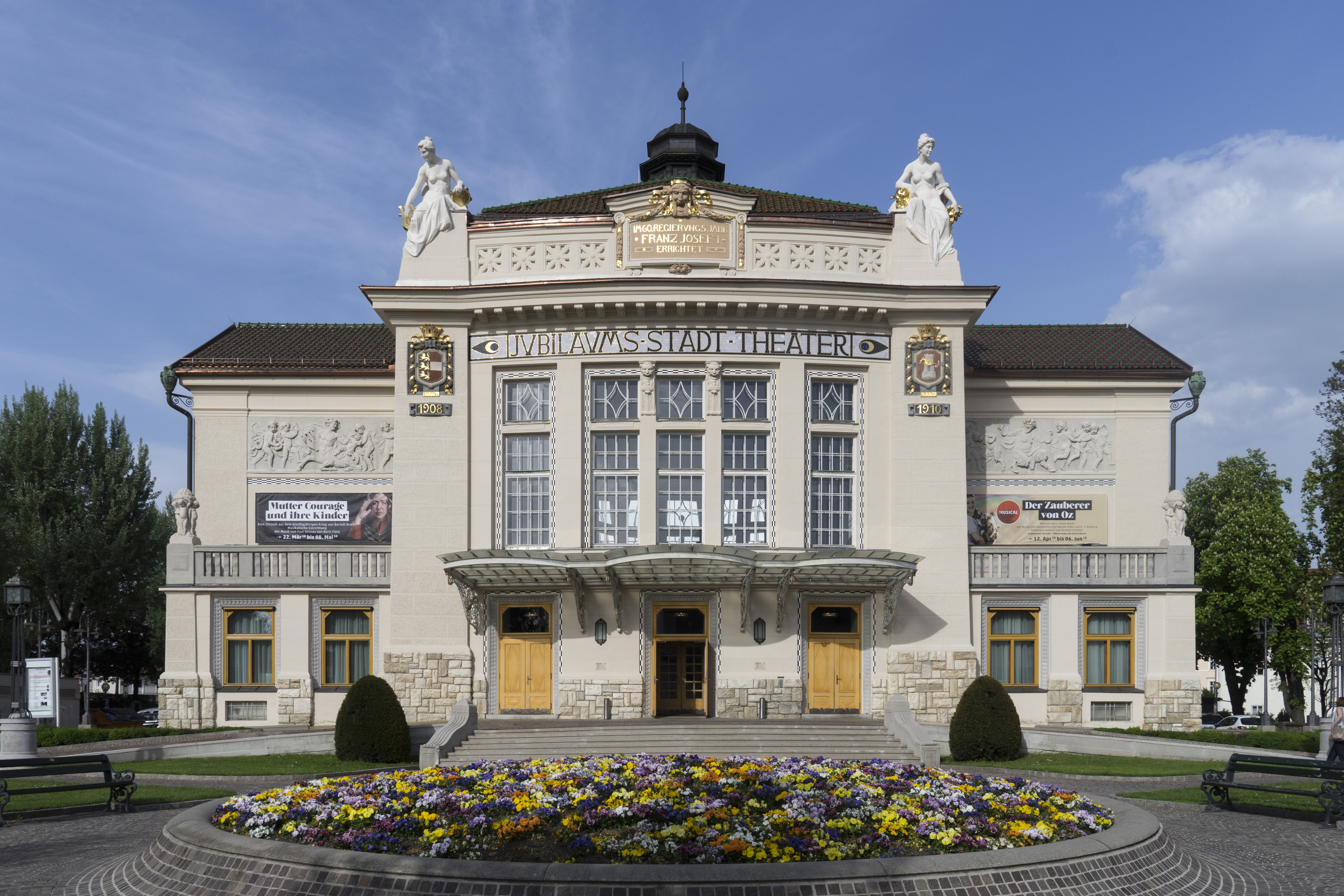
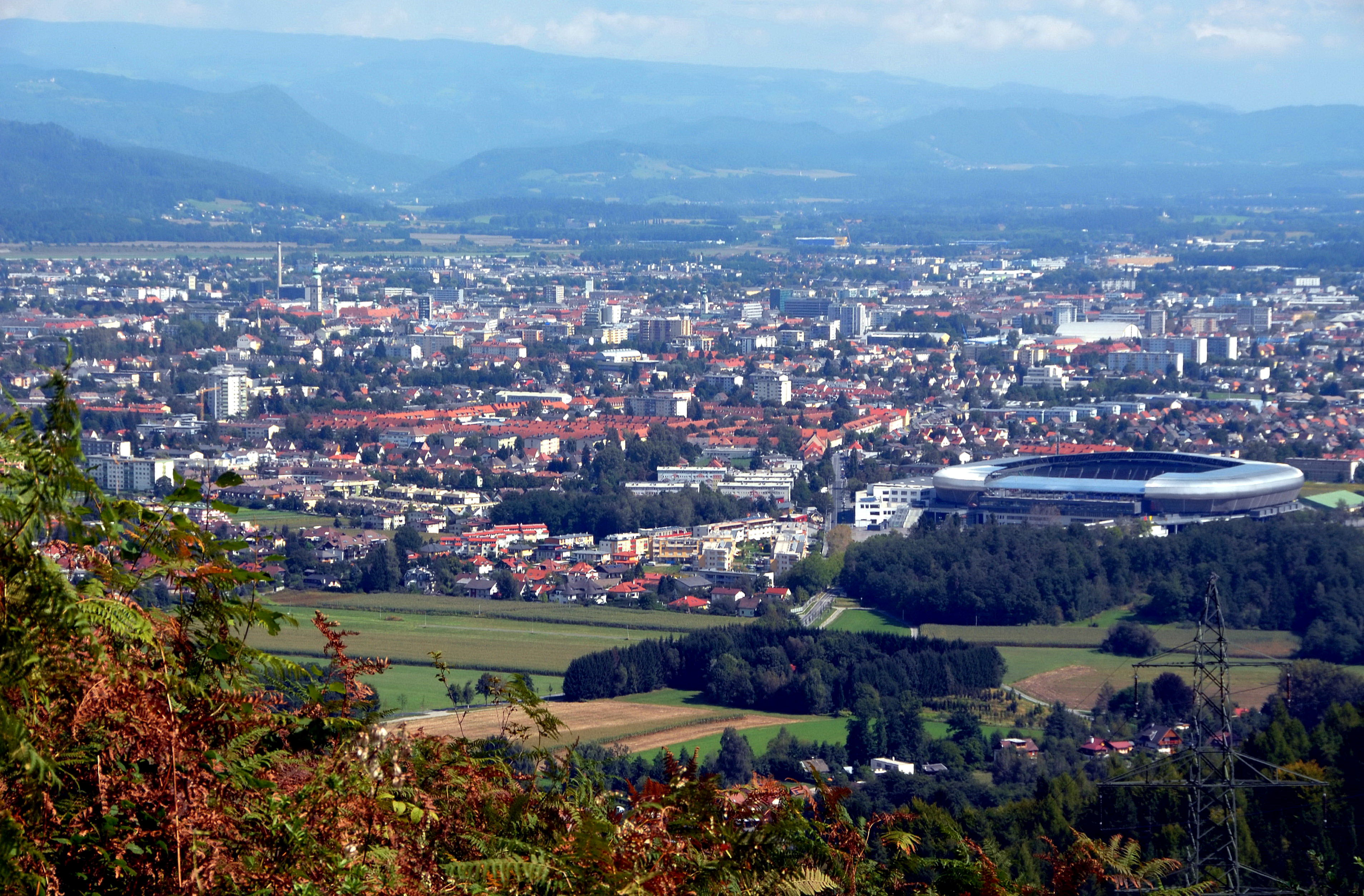
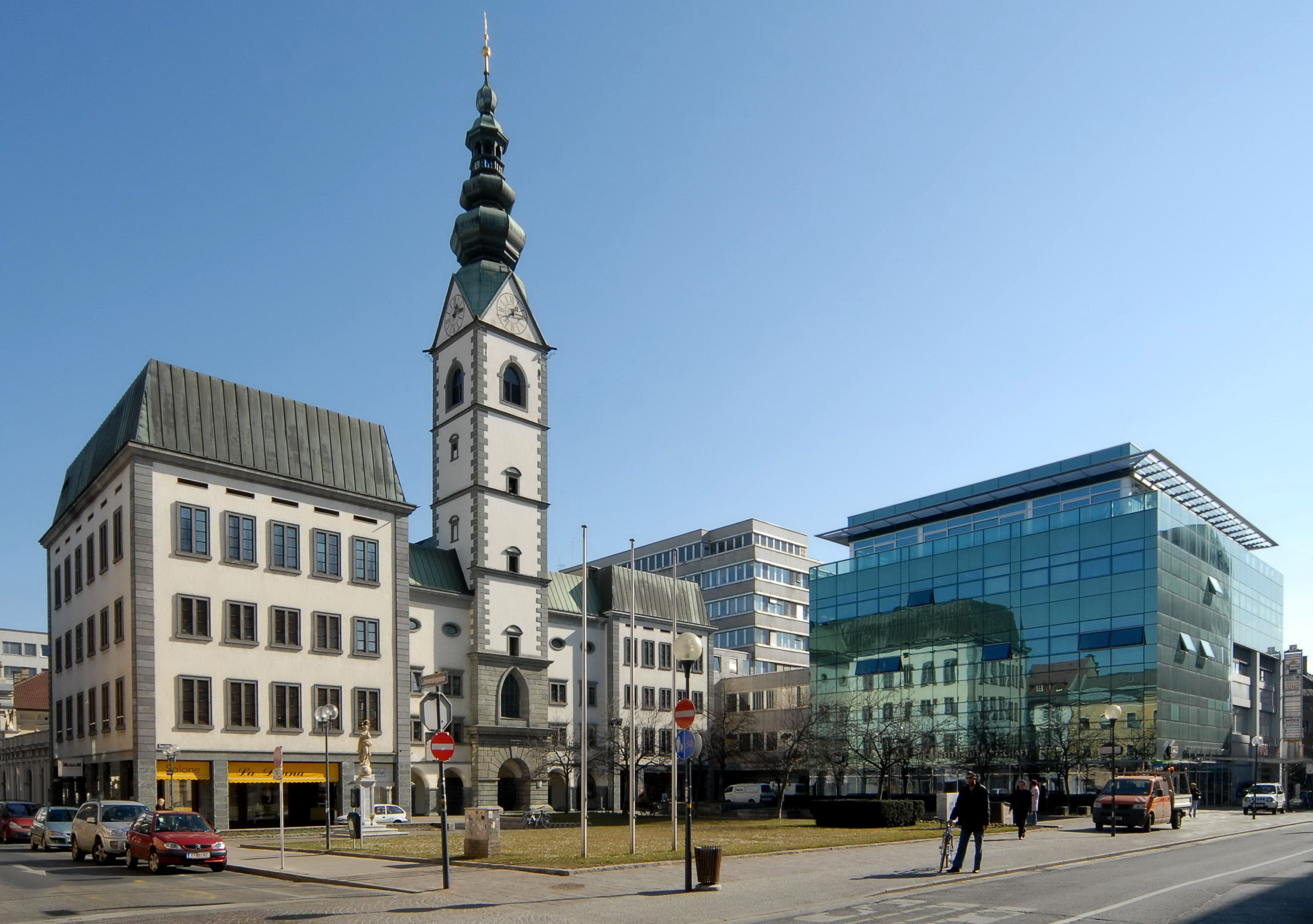
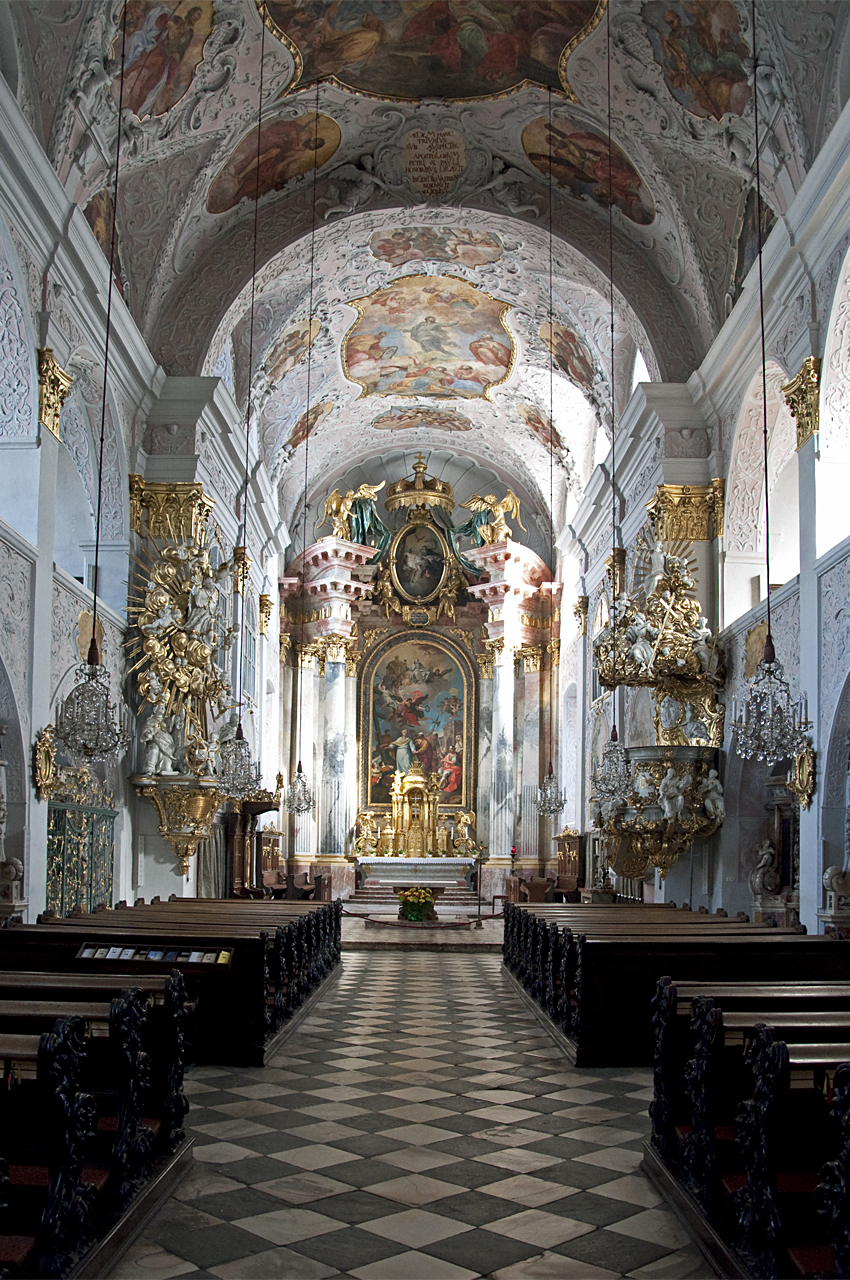
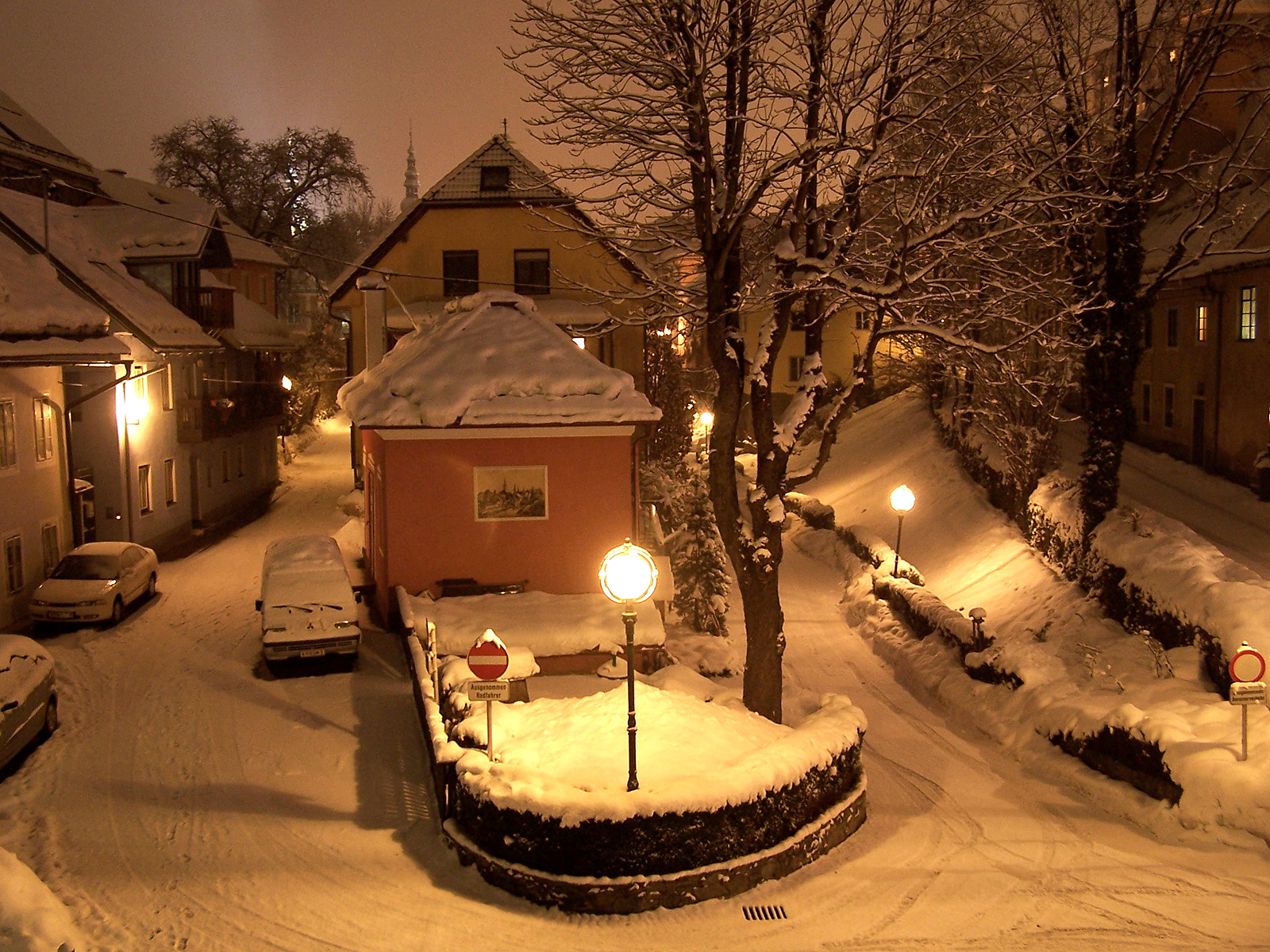
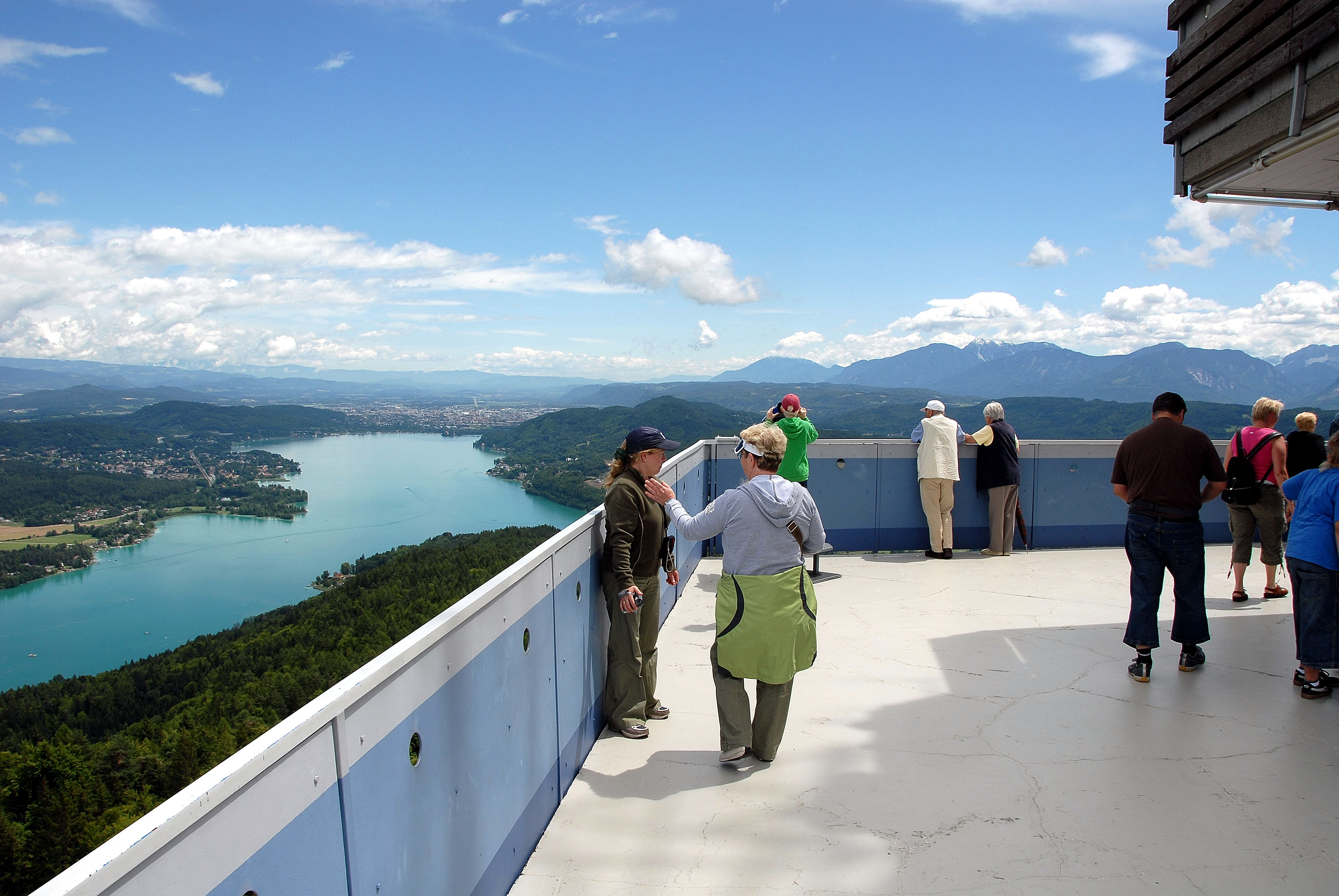
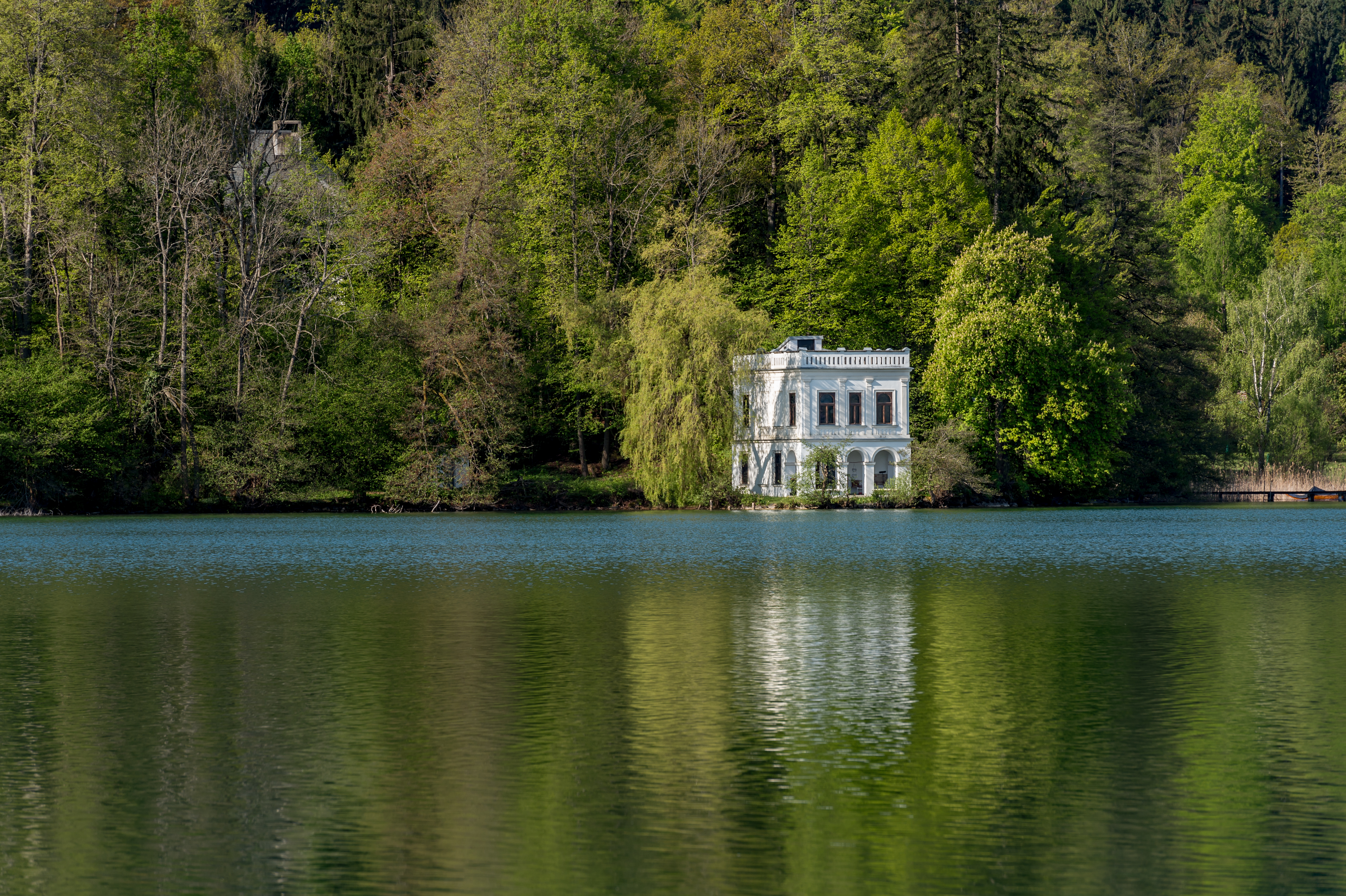
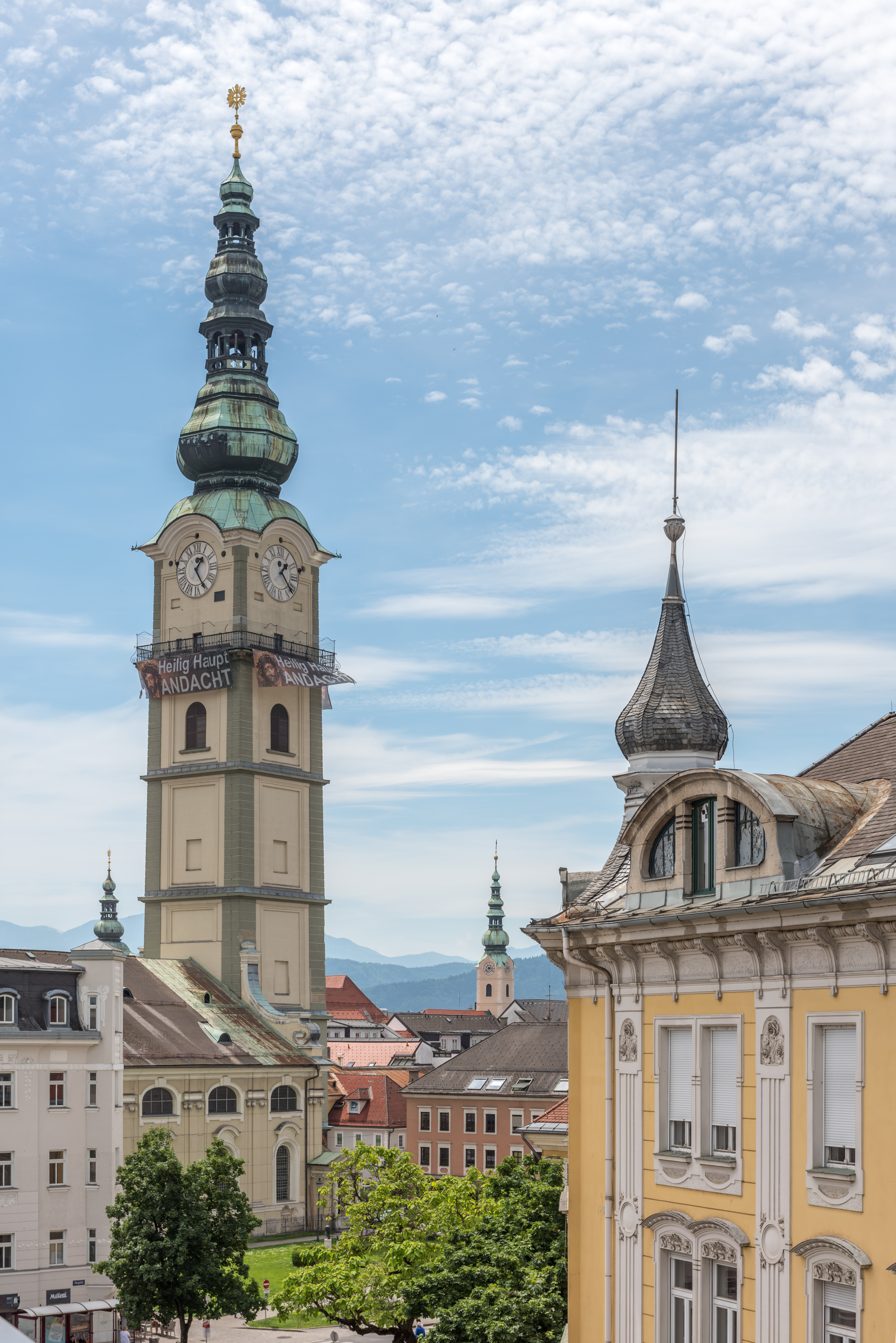
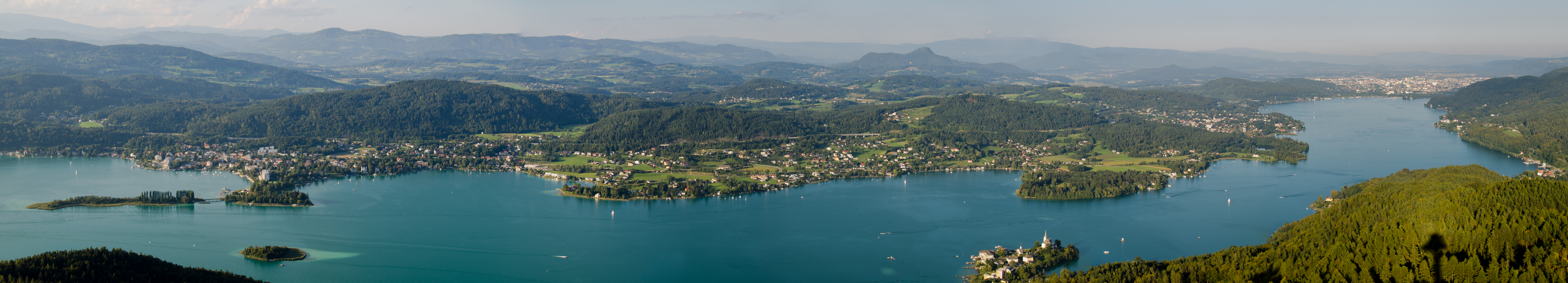
- Skyline of Klagenfurt Trinity Column Stadttheater Klagenfurt Klagenfurt with Wörthersee Stadion Klagenfurt Cathedral Cathedral Lendhafen Quarter Klagenfurt from the Pyramidenkogel Villa Samek St. Egid Wörthersee with Klagenfurt at the eastern end (right)

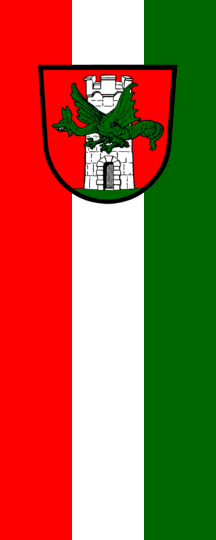
- Flag Coat of arms

- Location of Klagenfurt within Carinthia Location of Klagenfurt within Austria
- Coordinates: 46°37′N 14°18′E
- Country: Austria
- State: Carinthia
- District: Statutory city

Government
  - Mayor: Christian Scheider (Team Kärnten)

Area
  - Total: 120.12 km^{2} (46.38 sq mi)
- Elevation: 446 m (1,463 ft)

Population (2020-01-01)
  - Total: 101,403
  - Density: 844.18/km^{2} (2,186.4/sq mi)
- Time zone: UTC+1 (CET)
  - Summer (DST): UTC+2 (CEST)
- Postal code: 9020, 9061, 9063, 9065, 9073, 9201
- Area code: 0463
- Vehicle registration: K
- Website: Klagenfurt.at

Klagenfurt am Wörthersee (/ˈklɑːɡənfʊərt/; German: [ˌklaːɡn̩fʊʁt ʔam ˈvœʁtɐzeː]; Slovene: Celovec; Austro-Bavarian: Klognfuat; Carinthian Slovene: Clouvc), usually known as simply Klagenfurt (English: /ˈklɑːɡənfʊərt/ KLAH-gən-foort), is the capital and largest city of the Austrian state of Carinthia, as well as of the historical region of Carinthia (including Slovenian Carinthia).

With a population of 105,759 (1 January 2026), it is the sixth-largest city in Austria after Vienna, Graz, Linz, Salzburg, and Innsbruck. The city is the bishop's seat of the Roman Catholic Diocese of Gurk-Klagenfurt and home to the University of Klagenfurt, the Carinthian University of Applied Sciences and the Gustav Mahler Private University for Music. Klagenfurt is considered the cultural centre of the Carinthian Slovenes (Slovene: koroški Slovenci; German: Kärntner Slowenen), one of Austria's indigenous minorities.

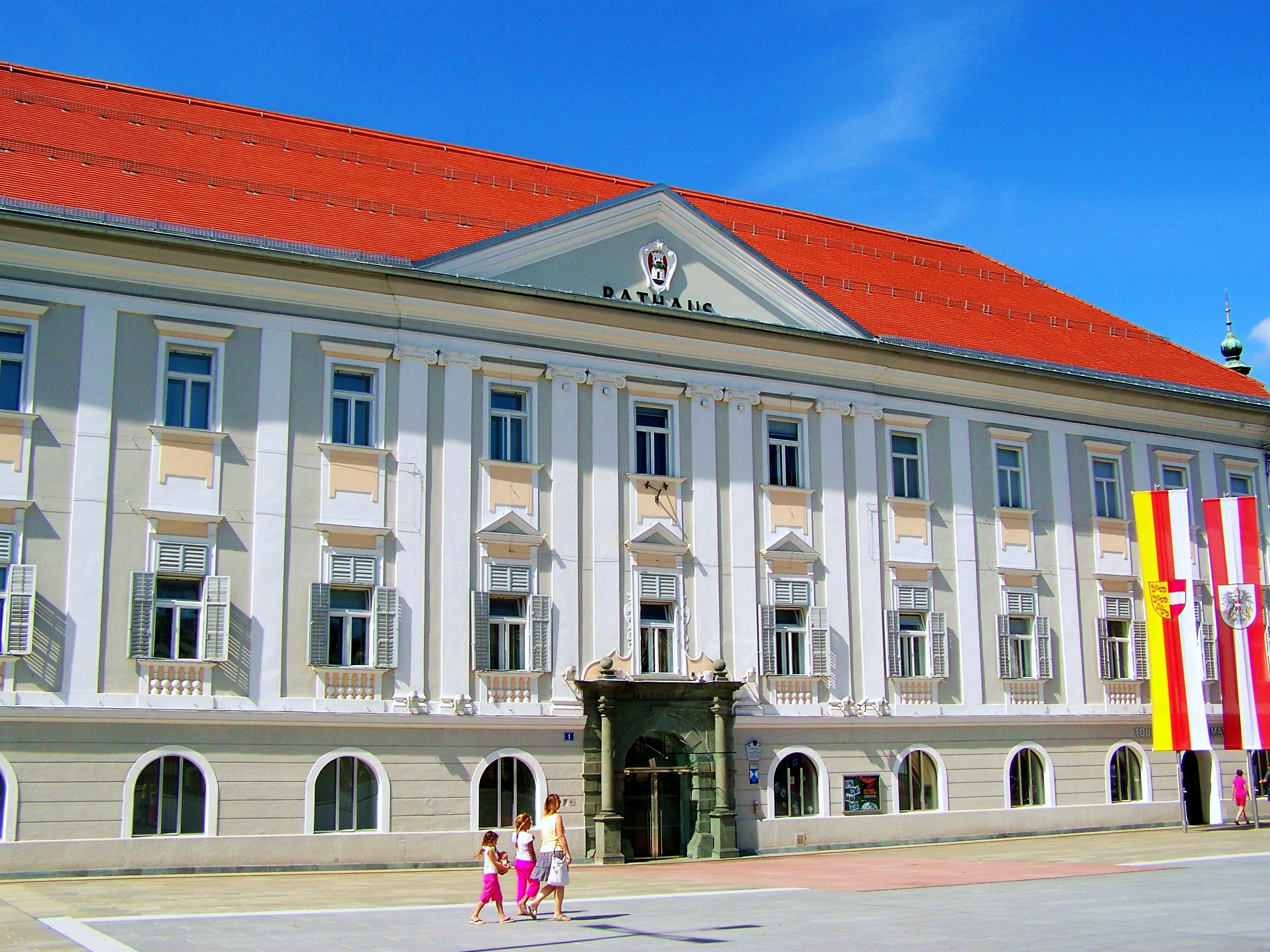
Klagenfurt City hall

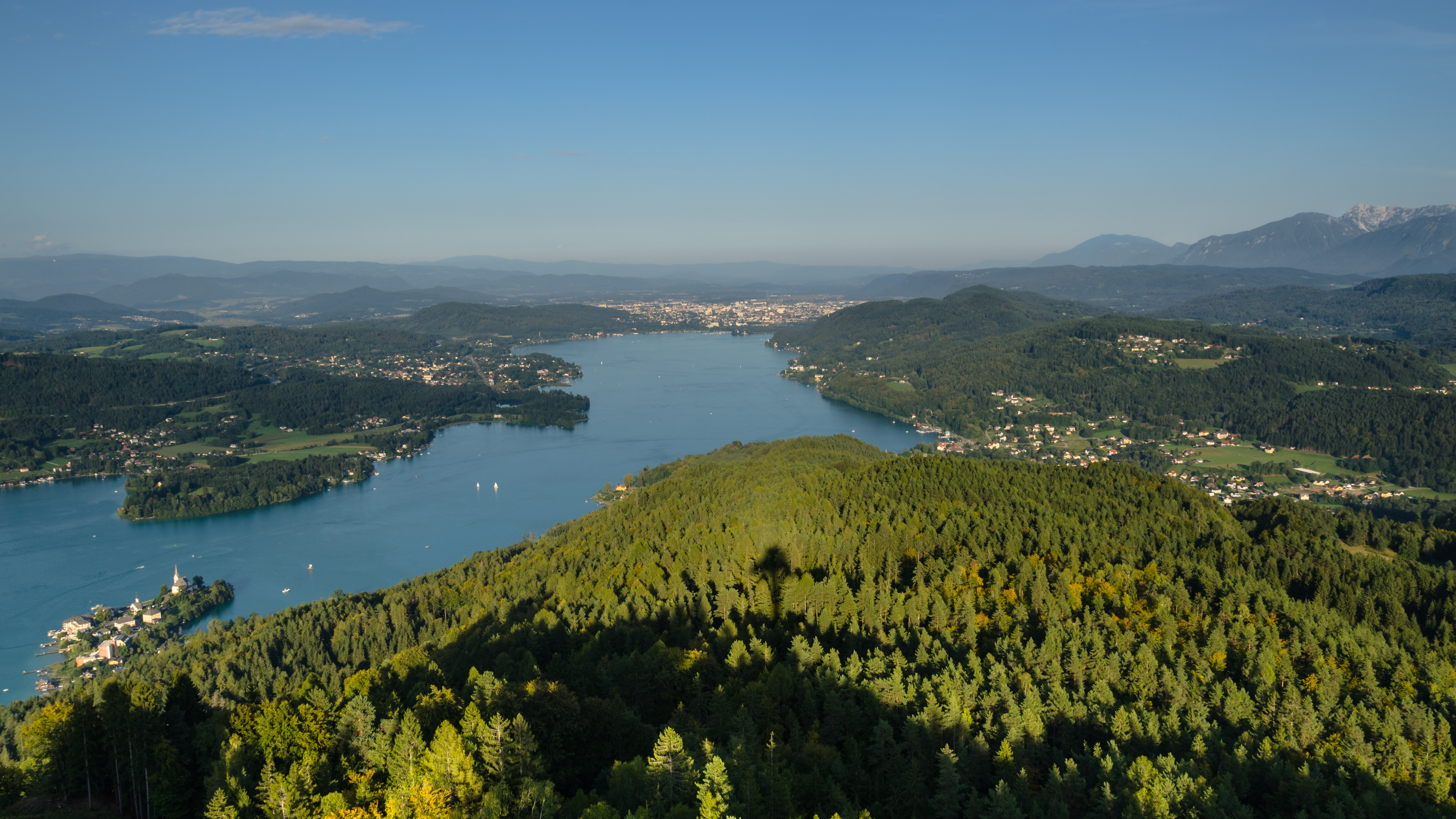
View from Pyramidenkogel towards Klagenfurt

== Name ==
The Carinthian linguists Primus Lessiak and Eberhard Kranzmayer assumed that the city's name, which literally translates as 'ford of lament' or 'ford of complaints', had something to do with the superstitious thought that fateful fairies or demons tend to live around treacherous waters or swamps. In Old Slovene, a cviljovec is a place haunted by such a wailing female ghost or cvilya. Thus, they assumed that Klagenfurt's name was a translation made by the German settlers of the original Slovene name of the neighbouring wetland. However, the earliest Slovene mention of Klagenfurt in the form of v Zelouzi ('in Celovec', the Slovene name for Klagenfurt), dating from 1615, is 400 years more recent and thus could be a translation from German. A later interpretation is that Old Slovene cviljovec may itself derive from an Italic l'aquiliu 'place at or in the water', which would make the wailing-hag theory obsolete.

Pre-modern scholars attempted to explain the city's peculiar name using pseudo-etymologies: in the 14th century, the abbot and historiographer John of Viktring translated Klagenfurt's name in his Liber certarum historiarum as Queremoniae Vadus 'ford of complaint', Hieronymus Megiser, master of the university college of the Carinthian Estates in Klagenfurt and editor of the earliest printed history of the duchy in 1612, believed the name to mean 'ford across the Glan River', which, however, is impossible for linguistic reasons. The common people also sought an explanation in a story that a baker's apprentice was accused of theft and executed, but when the alleged theft turned out to be a mistake a few days afterwards, and the lad was proved innocent, the citizens' "lament" (Klagen) went forth and forth. This story was reported by Aeneas Silvius Piccolomini, who later became Pope Pius II.

In 2007, the city changed its official name to Klagenfurt am Wörthersee ('Klagenfurt on Lake Wörth'). However, since there are no other settlements called Klagenfurt in the world, the previous shorter name is nearly always used.

== History ==
=== Foundation ===
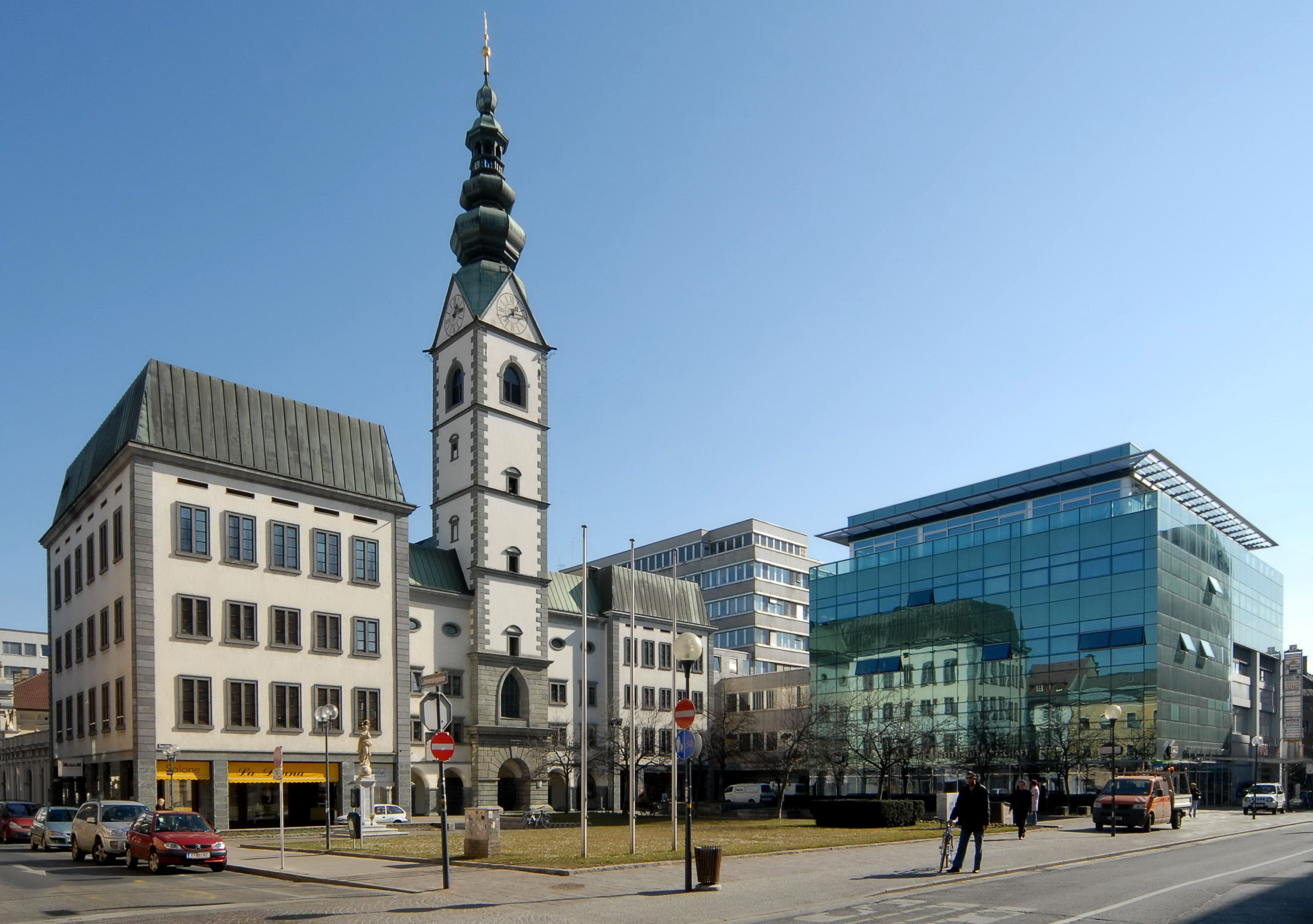
The Cathedral of Klagenfurt and the Domplatz

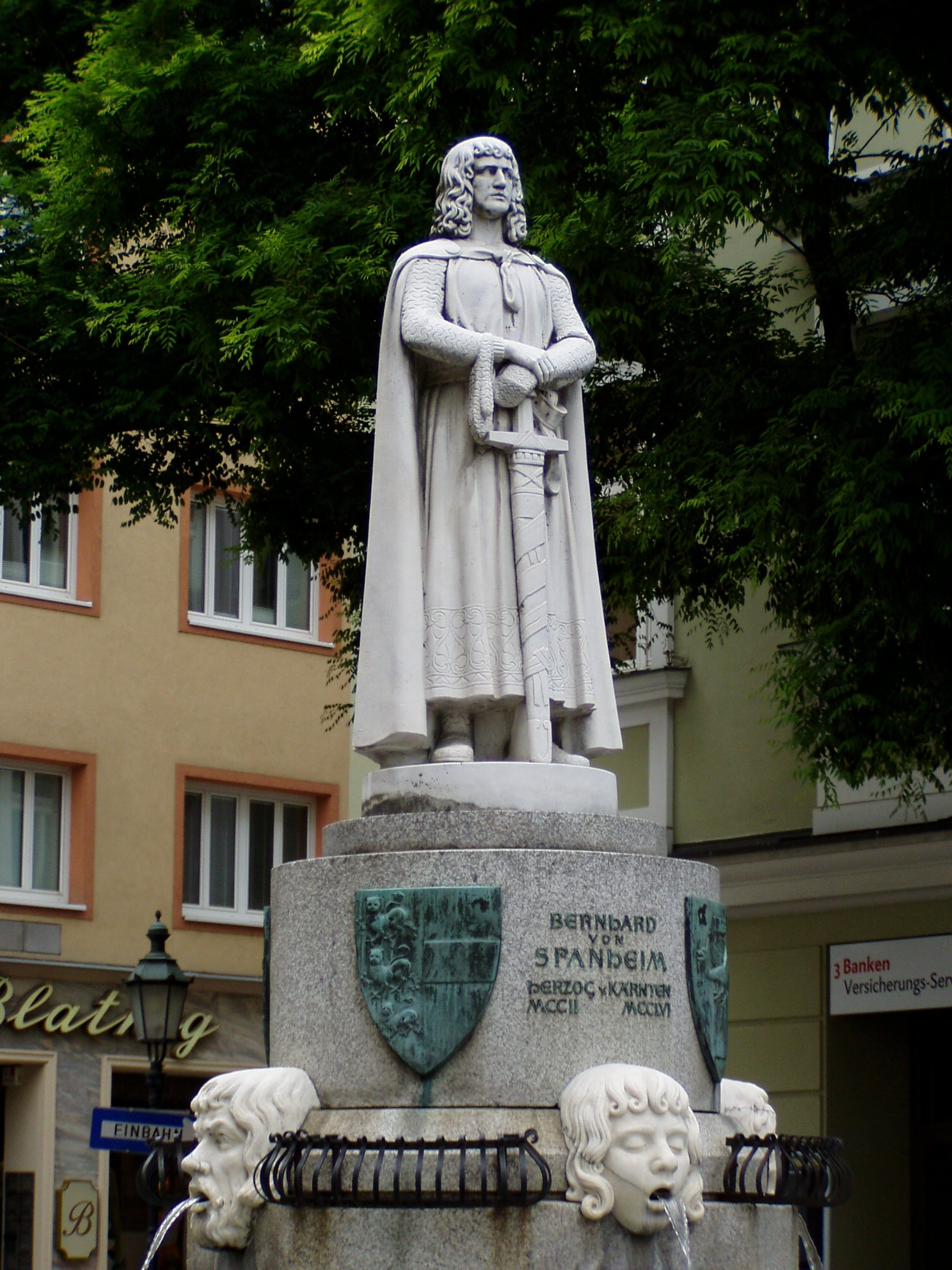
Duke Bernhard von Spanheim, the founder of the City

Legend has it that Klagenfurt was founded after a group of brave men slew an abominable winged "lindwurm" from the moors adjoining the lake, which was preying on the nearby duchy. The legend says that a tower at the edge of the moor was erected to watch out for the dragon, and that the dragon was baited using a bull fitted with a chain and hook, which caught the beast's palatal. A village was subsequently founded on the battlesite, which later expanded into a town, while the watchtower made way for a castle. The feat is commemorated by a grandiose 9-ton Renaissance monument, the Lindwurmbrunnen, in the city centre.

Historically, the place was founded by the Spanheim Duke Herman as a stronghold sited across the commercial routes in the area. Its first mention dates from the late 12th century in a document in which Duke Ulric II. exempted St. Paul's Abbey from the toll charge "in foro Chlagenvurth". That settlement occupied an area that was subject to frequent flooding, so in 1246 Duke Herman's son, Duke Bernhard von Spanheim, moved it to a safer position and is thus considered to be the actual founder of the market place, which in 1252 received a city charter.

=== Medieval history ===
In the following centuries, Klagenfurt suffered fires, earthquakes, invasions of locusts, and attacks from Ottomans, and was ravaged by the Peasants' Wars. In 1514, a fire almost completely destroyed the city, and in 1518 Emperor Maximilian I, unable to rebuild it, despite the loud protests of the citizens, ceded Klagenfurt to the Estates, the nobility of the Duchy. Never before had such a thing happened. The new owners, however, brought about an economic renaissance and the political and cultural ascendancy in Klagenfurt. A canal was dug to connect the city to the lake as a supply route for timber to rebuild the city and to feed the city's new moats; the noble families had their town-houses built in the duchy's new capital; the city was enlarged along a geometrical chequer-board lay-out according to the Renaissance ideas of the Italian architect Domenico dell'Allio; a new city centre square, the Neuer Platz, was constructed; and the new fortifications that took half a century to build made Klagenfurt the strongest fortress north of the Alps.

=== Industrial era ===
In 1809, however, the French troops (under Napoleon) destroyed the city walls, leaving, against a large sum collected by the citizens, only one eastern gate (which was pulled down to make way for traffic some decades later), and the small stretch in the west which is now all that is left of the once grand fortifications. In 1863, the railway connection to St. Veit an der Glan boosted the city's economy and so did the building of the Vienna-Trieste railway that brought to the city an imposing central station (destroyed in World War II) and solidified Klagenfurt as the centre of the region.

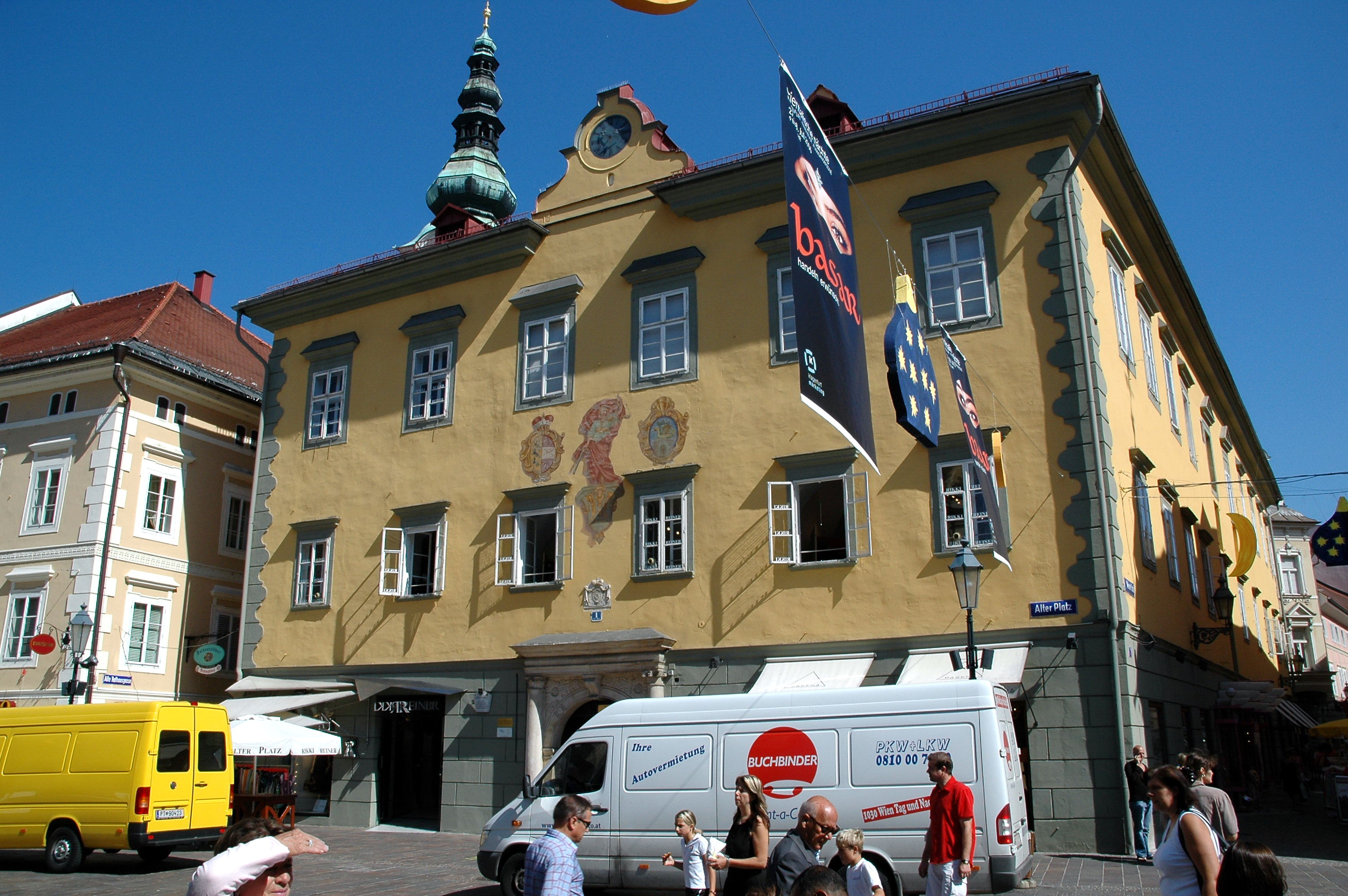
Former city hall, Alter Platz

During the 19th century, the city developed into an important centre of Carinthian Slovene culture. Many important Slovene public figures lived, studied or worked in Klagenfurt, among them Anton Martin Slomšek, who later became the first bishop of Maribor and was beatified in 1999, the philologists Jurij Japelj and Anton Janežič, the politician Andrej Einspieler, and the activist Matija Majar. The Slovene national poet France Prešeren also spent a short part of his professional career there. On the initiative of bishop Slomšek, teacher Anton Janežič and vicar Andrej Einspieler on 27 July 1851 in Klagenfurt the Hermagoras Society publishing house was founded, which in 1919 moved to Prevalje and then in 1927 to Celje, but was re-established in Klagenfurt in 1947. Several Slovene language newspapers were also published in the city, among them Slovenski glasnik. By the late 19th century, however, the Slovene cultural and political influence in Klagenfurt had declined sharply, and by the end of World War I, the city showed an overwhelmingly Austrian German character.

Nevertheless, in 1919, the city was occupied by the Army of the Kingdom of Serbs, Croats and Slovenes and claimed for the newly founded South-Slav kingdom. In 1920, the Yugoslav occupying forces withdrew from the town centre, but remained in its southern suburbs, such as Viktring and Ebenthal. They eventually withdrew after the Carinthian Plebiscite in October 1920, when the majority of voters in the Carinthian mixed-language Zone A decided to remain part of Austria.

=== World War II ===
In 1938, Klagenfurt's population suddenly grew by more than 50% through the incorporation of the town of St. Ruprecht and the municipalities of St. Peter, Annabichl, and St. Martin but during World War II, the city was bombed 41 times. The bombs killed 612 people, completely destroyed 443 buildings and damaged 1,132 others. A volume of 110,000 cubic metres (3,884,613 cu ft) of rubble had to be removed before the citizens could set about rebuilding their city.

From the beginning of 1945, when the end of the war was rather obvious, numerous talks among representatives of democratic pre-1934 organisations had taken place, which later extended to high-ranking officers of the Wehrmacht and officials of the administration. Even representatives of the partisans in the hills south of Klagenfurt were met who, in view of the strong SS-forces in Klagenfurt, agreed not to attempt to take the city by force, but upheld the official declaration that south-eastern Carinthia was to be a Yugoslav possession.

To avoid further destruction and a major bloodshed, on 3 May 1945 General Löhr of Army Group E (Heeresgruppe E) agreed to declare Klagenfurt an "open city" "in case Anglo-American forces should attack the city", a declaration that was broadcast several times and two days later also published in the Kärntner Nachrichten.

On 7 May 1945, a committee convened in the historic Landhaus building of the Gau authorities to form a Provisional State government, and one of the numerous decisions taken was a proclamation to the "People of Carinthia". This proclamation included the reporting of the resignation of the Gauleiter and Reichsstatthalter Friedrich Rainer, the transfer of power to the new authorities, and an appeal to the people to decorate their homes with Austrian or Carinthian colours. The proclamation was printed in the Kärntner Zeitung of 8 May. When on the following day, Yugoslav military demanded of Klagenfurt's new mayor that he remove the Austrian flag from the city hall and fly the Yugoslav flag instead, the acting British Town Officer Captain Watson immediately prohibited this, but also ordered that the Austrian flag be taken down. Accompanied by a guerilla troop carrying a machine pistol, a Yugoslav emissary appeared on the same day in the Landesregierung building, demanding of the Acting State Governor Piesch repeal the order to take down the Yugoslav flag, which was ignored.

On 8 May 1945, 9:30 am, British troops of the Eighth Army under General McCreery entered Klagenfurt and were met in front of Stauderhaus by the new democratic city and state authorities. All the strategic positions and important buildings were immediately seized, and Major General Horatius Murray was taken to General Noeldechen for the official surrender of the 438th German Division. Three hours later, groups of partisan forces arrived on a train they had seized in the Rosental valley the day before, at the same time as Yugoslav regular forces of the IVth army. Both of these forces made their way through the city's streets which were jammed with tens of thousands of Volksdeutsche refugees, and masses of soldiers of all the nationalities that had been fighting under German command and were now fleeing the Russians. These partisan and Yugoslav regular forces claimed the city and the surrounding South Carinthian land, establishing the Komanda staba za Koroška, which would be named the "Commandantura of the Carinthian Military Zone" under Major Egon Remec. On Neuer Platz—renamed Adolf Hitler Platz in 1938—British armoured vehicles are said to have faced allied Yugoslav ones in a hostile way, which would have been a curious spectacle for the liberated citizens, but this is unlikely.

Several days passed before, under British pressure and American diplomatic backing, the Yugoslav troops withdrew from the city proper, but not before establishing a parallel Carinthian-Slovene civil administration (the Carinthian National Council) presided over by Franc Petek. However, protected by British soldiers, the members of the Provisional State Government went about devising a comprehensive programme to cover the new political, sociological, and economic outlooks in the land, which would serve the British military authorities. Rapid financial assistance and the restitution of property to the victims of the Nazi regime was necessary. This posed a problem, because one of the first actions of the British had been to confiscate all the property of the Nazi Party, as well as to freeze their bank accounts and to block their financial transfers. It took months before basic communication and public transport, mail service and supply were working again, to some extent at least. During the years that followed these turbulent days, a major part of the British Eighth Army, which in July 1945 was re-constituted as British Troops in Austria (BTA), had their headquarters in Klagenfurt - as Carinthia, together with neighbouring Styria, formed part of the British occupation zone in liberated Austria, which remained to be the case until 26 October 1955.

Historical population
Year	Pop.	±%
1910	45,161	—
1923	43,536	−3.6%
1934	53,000	+21.7%
1939	61,286	+15.6%
1951	68,187	+11.3%
1961	75,684	+11.0%
1971	82,840	+9.5%
1981	87,321	+5.4%
1991	89,415	+2.4%
2001	90,141	+0.8%
2011	94,483	+4.8%
2021	101,765	+7.7%
2025	105,759	+3.9%

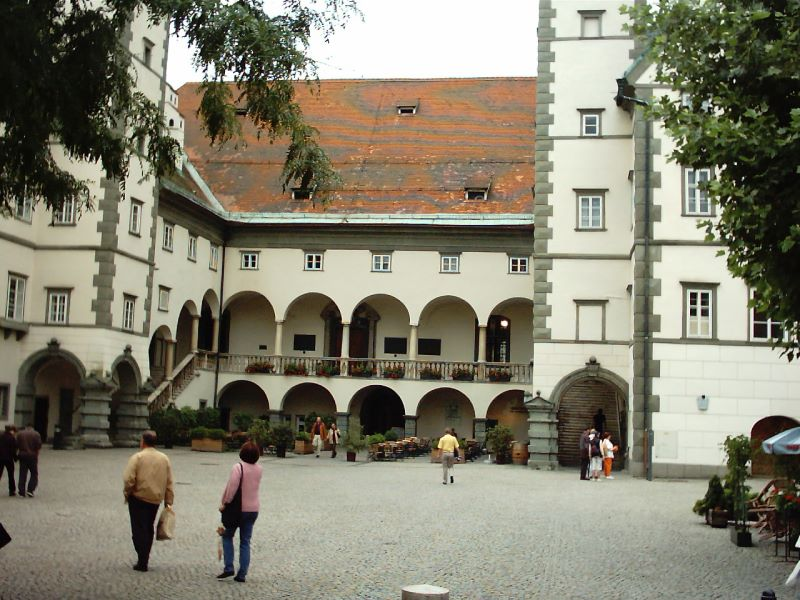
"Landhaus", the palace of the Estates, now State Assembly

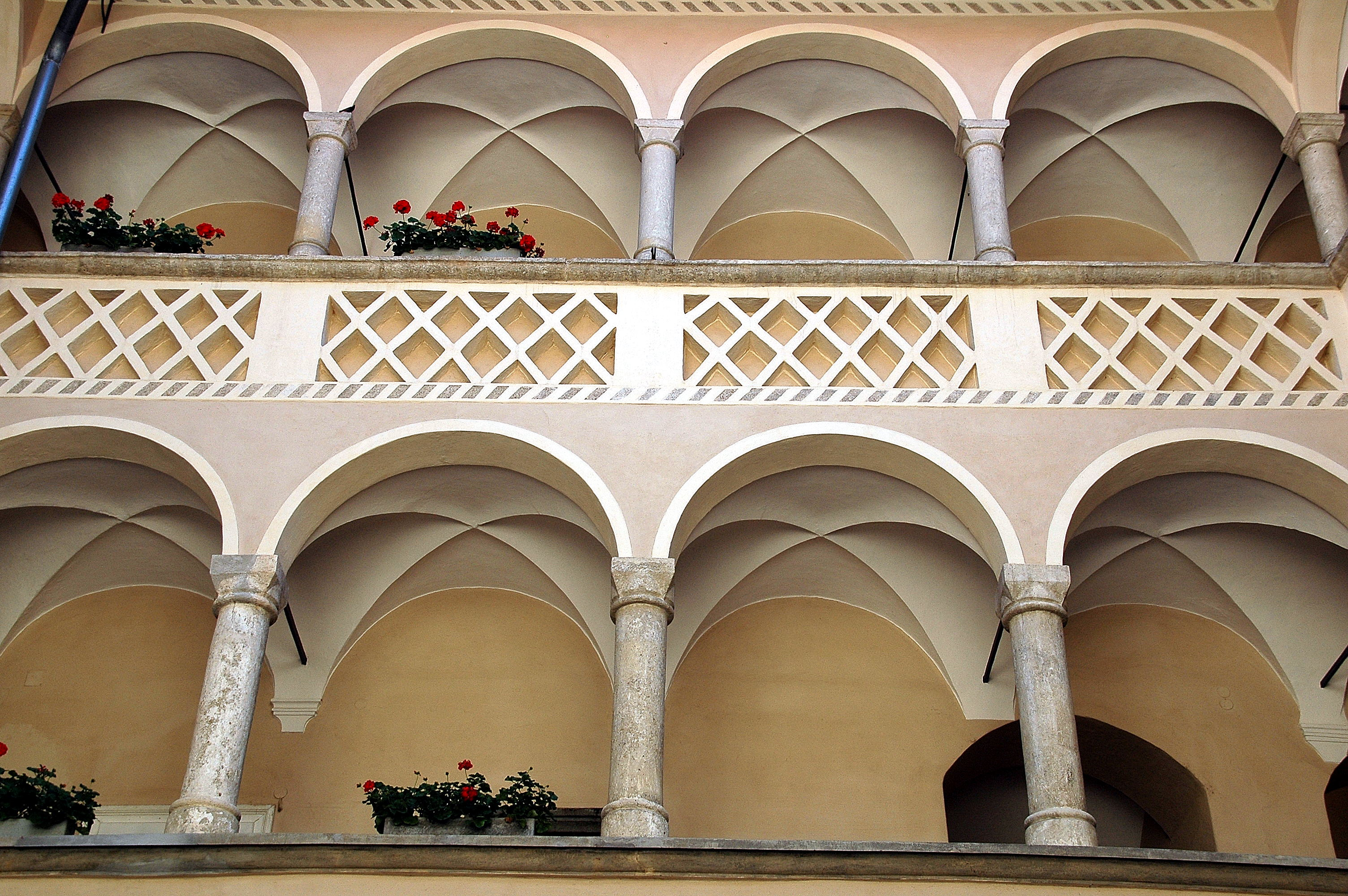
Arcaded yard in the former city hall

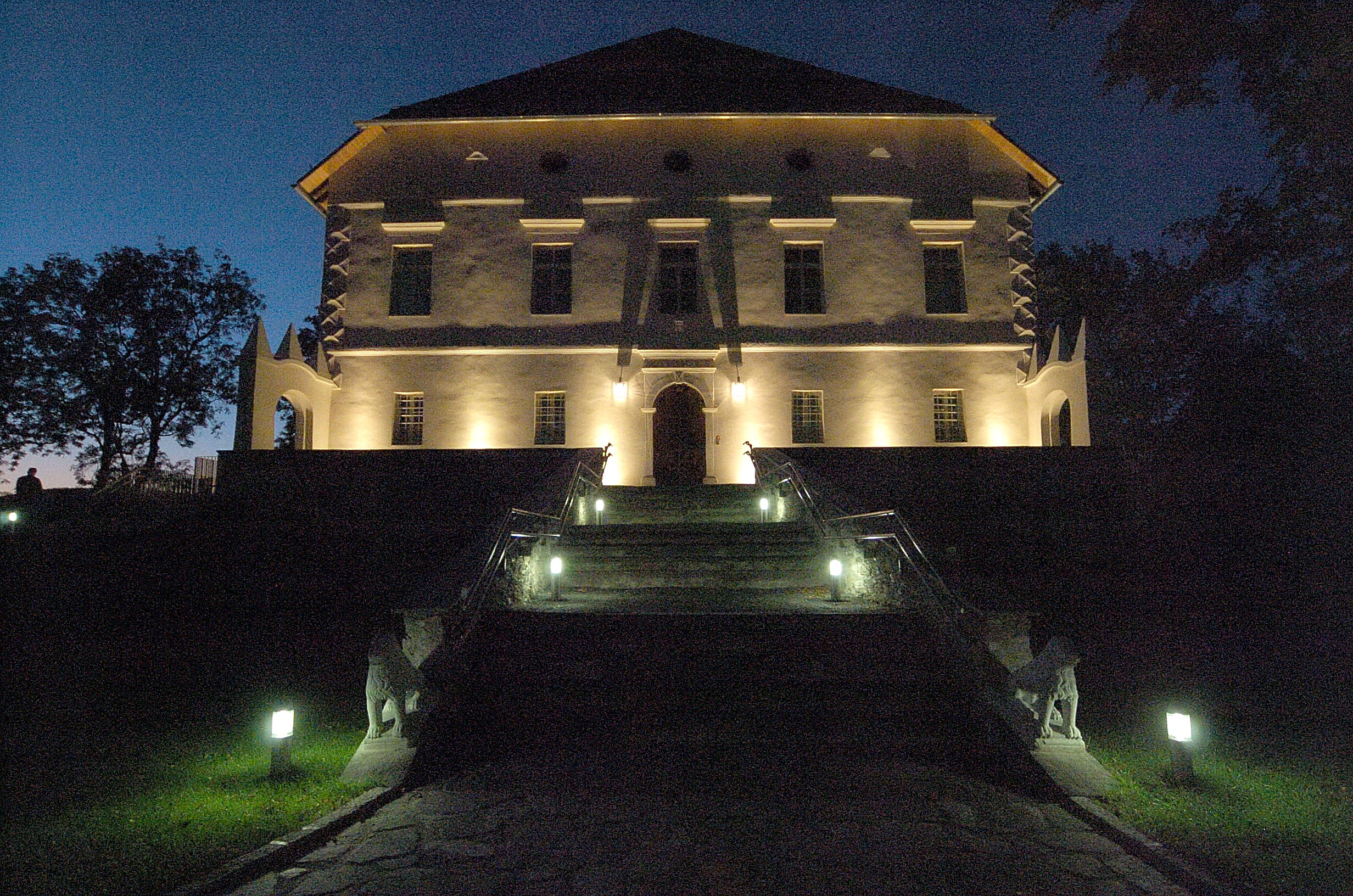
Loretto after renovation 2007

=== Modern history ===
In 1961, Klagenfurt became the first city in Austria to adopt a pedestrian zone. The idea of a friendly twinning of cities in other countries began with the first city partnership between Klagenfurt and Wiesbaden, Germany, as early as 1930. This was followed up by numerous city partnerships, with the result that in 1968, Klagenfurt was honoured with the title of "European City of the Year". Klagenfurt has also been awarded the prestigious Europa Nostra Diploma of Merit (an award for the exemplary restoration and redevelopment of its ancient centre) a total of three times, which is a record for a European city.

In 1973, Klagenfurt absorbed four more adjacent municipalities: Viktring, with its grand Cistercian monastery; Wölfnitz; Hörtendorf; and St. Peter am Bichl. The addition of these municipalities increased the population of Klagenfurt to about 90,000.

== Geography ==
=== Location ===
The city of Klagenfurt is in southern Austria, near the border with Slovenia. It is in the lower middle of Austria, almost the same distance from Innsbruck in the west as it is from Vienna in the northeast.

Klagenfurt is elevated 446 metres (1,463 feet) above sea level and covers an area of 120.03 square kilometres (46 3/8 sq mi). It is on the lake Wörthersee and on the Glan river. The city is surrounded by several forest covered hills and mountains, with heights of up to 1,000 m (3,300 ft) (for example Ulrichsberg). To the south of the city is the Karawanken mountain range, which separates Carinthia from bordering nations of Slovenia and Italy.

=== Municipal arrangement ===
Klagenfurt is a statutory city of Carinthia, and the administrative seat of the district of Klagenfurt-Land, but is a separate district from Klagenfurt-Land. In fact, their licence plates are different (K for the city, KL for the district). Klagenfurt is divided itself into 16 districts:

- I–IV Innere Stadt
- V St. Veiter Vorstadt
- VI Völkermarkter Vorstadt
- VII Viktringer Vorstadt
- VIII Villacher Vorstadt
- IX Annabichl
- X St. Peter

- XI St. Ruprecht
- XII St. Martin
- XIII Viktring
- XIV Wölfnitz
- XV Hörtendorf
- XVI Welzenegg

It is further divided into 25 Katastralgemeinden. They are: Klagenfurt, Blasendorf, Ehrenthal, Goritschitzen, Großbuch, Großponfeld, Gurlitsch I, Hallegg, Hörtendorf, Kleinbuch, Lendorf, Marolla, Nagra, Neudorf, St. Martin bei Klagenfurt, St. Peter am Karlsberg, St. Peter bei Ebenthal, Sankt Peter am Bichl, St. Ruprecht bei Klagenfurt, Stein, Tentschach, Viktring, Waidmannsdorf, Waltendorf, and Welzenegg.

=== Climate ===
Klagenfurt has a typical humid continental climate (Köppen Dfb, Trewartha Dcbo), with a fair amount of fog throughout the autumn and winter, which occurs in 106 days annually. Summers are warm and wet, with frequent thunderstorms which happen in 43.8 days on average. Klagenfurt experiences 70.9 days annually with maximum temperature at or above 25 °C (77 °F), and 18.8 days in which the maximum temperature reaches 30 °C (86 °F). The rather cold winters are broken up by occasional warmer periods due to foehn wind from the Karawanken mountains to the south. On 52.9 days the depth of snow cover is at or above 1 cm (0.39 in), with 10.1 days having more than 20 cm (7.9 in) of snow depth. The average temperature from 1961 to 1990 was 7.1 °C (44.8 °F), while the average temperature in 1991-2020 period is 9.9 °C (49.8 °F).

Climate data for Klagenfurt (1991–2020 normals, extremes 1961-2025, humidity and dew point 1961-1990)
Month	Jan	Feb	Mar	Apr	May	Jun	Jul	Aug	Sep	Oct	Nov	Dec	Year
Record high °C (°F)	16.4 (61.5)	21.5 (70.7)	24.0 (75.2)	28.2 (82.8)	32.4 (90.3)	37.9 (100.2)	38.1 (100.6)	37.8 (100.0)	31.6 (88.9)	26.3 (79.3)	21.5 (70.7)	16.6 (61.9)	38.1 (100.6)
Mean daily maximum °C (°F)	1.5 (34.7)	5.7 (42.3)	11.2 (52.2)	16.6 (61.9)	20.7 (69.3)	25.2 (77.4)	26.2 (79.2)	25.5 (77.9)	20.8 (69.4)	14.4 (57.9)	7.5 (45.5)	1.4 (34.5)	14.7 (58.5)
Daily mean °C (°F)	−2.1 (28.2)	0.4 (32.7)	5.6 (42.1)	10.4 (50.7)	15.2 (59.4)	19.0 (66.2)	20.7 (69.3)	20.3 (68.5)	15.4 (59.7)	10.3 (50.5)	4.4 (39.9)	−1.3 (29.7)	9.9 (49.7)
Mean daily minimum °C (°F)	−5.6 (21.9)	−4.8 (23.4)	−0.4 (31.3)	4.3 (39.7)	8.7 (47.7)	12.8 (55.0)	13.9 (57.0)	13.7 (56.7)	10.0 (50.0)	5.5 (41.9)	1.3 (34.3)	−3.9 (25.0)	4.6 (40.3)
Record low °C (°F)	−27.8 (−18.0)	−25.6 (−14.1)	−21.1 (−6.0)	−5.9 (21.4)	−3.8 (25.2)	−0.6 (30.9)	3.0 (37.4)	3.4 (38.1)	−1.6 (29.1)	−8.9 (16.0)	−17.4 (0.7)	−21.8 (−7.2)	−27.8 (−18.0)
Average precipitation mm (inches)	27.0 (1.06)	38.0 (1.50)	46.3 (1.82)	63.1 (2.48)	85.6 (3.37)	105.0 (4.13)	119.0 (4.69)	130.8 (5.15)	102.1 (4.02)	90.9 (3.58)	84.8 (3.34)	50.4 (1.98)	943 (37.12)
Average precipitation days (≥ 1.0 mm)	4.3	4.6	5.5	8.1	9.9	10.3	10.6	10.6	8	7.7	7.7	5.6	92.9
Average relative humidity (%)	88	82	75	69	69	70	71	75	81	84	89	90	79
Average dew point °C (°F)	−5.5 (22.1)	−3.9 (25.0)	−1.4 (29.5)	2.2 (36.0)	7.3 (45.1)	10.8 (51.4)	12.8 (55.0)	12.9 (55.2)	10.5 (50.9)	5.7 (42.3)	0.4 (32.7)	−4.0 (24.8)	4.0 (39.2)
Mean monthly sunshine hours	94.5	135.2	187.7	197.1	230.8	239.2	257.1	248.4	191.9	134.7	68.1	67.8	2,052.5
Source: NOAA NCEI Ogimet

Climate data for Klagenfurt (1981–2010)
Month	Jan	Feb	Mar	Apr	May	Jun	Jul	Aug	Sep	Oct	Nov	Dec	Year
Record high °C (°F)	15.7 (60.3)	21.5 (70.7)	24.0 (75.2)	27.0 (80.6)	32.4 (90.3)	35.3 (95.5)	35.8 (96.4)	36.6 (97.9)	30.7 (87.3)	25.2 (77.4)	21.5 (70.7)	16.6 (61.9)	36.6 (97.9)
Mean daily maximum °C (°F)	0.6 (33.1)	4.8 (40.6)	10.7 (51.3)	15.6 (60.1)	21.0 (69.8)	24.2 (75.6)	26.5 (79.7)	25.6 (78.1)	20.7 (69.3)	14.6 (58.3)	6.7 (44.1)	1.1 (34.0)	14.3 (57.7)
Daily mean °C (°F)	−2.8 (27.0)	−0.4 (31.3)	4.3 (39.7)	9.3 (48.7)	14.4 (57.9)	17.8 (64.0)	19.8 (67.6)	19.0 (66.2)	14.3 (57.7)	9.3 (48.7)	3.1 (37.6)	−1.4 (29.5)	8.9 (48.0)
Mean daily minimum °C (°F)	−7.1 (19.2)	−5.6 (21.9)	−1.2 (29.8)	3.4 (38.1)	8.4 (47.1)	11.8 (53.2)	13.5 (56.3)	13.2 (55.8)	9.3 (48.7)	5.1 (41.2)	−0.2 (31.6)	−4.8 (23.4)	3.8 (38.8)
Record low °C (°F)	−25.1 (−13.2)	−25.6 (−14.1)	−18.8 (−1.8)	−5.9 (21.4)	−2.0 (28.4)	2.1 (35.8)	3.0 (37.4)	3.4 (38.1)	−1.0 (30.2)	−8.9 (16.0)	−17.4 (0.7)	−21.8 (−7.2)	−25.6 (−14.1)
Average precipitation mm (inches)	26 (1.0)	29 (1.1)	51 (2.0)	62 (2.4)	80 (3.1)	105 (4.1)	113 (4.4)	126 (5.0)	92 (3.6)	84 (3.3)	76 (3.0)	51 (2.0)	893 (35.2)
Average relative humidity (%) (at 14:00)	76.5	60.7	52.0	48.7	49.2	50.1	49.1	51.3	55.3	63.6	74.0	80.6	59.3
Mean monthly sunshine hours	90	140	170	184	223	226	255	239	189	128	74	62	1,981
Percentage possible sunshine	35.7	53.3	49.8	48.9	50.8	51.1	57.1	57.6	53.0	41.3	27.0	24.8	45.9
Source: Central Institute for Meteorology and Geodynamics

Climate data for Klagenfurt (1971–2000)
Month	Jan	Feb	Mar	Apr	May	Jun	Jul	Aug	Sep	Oct	Nov	Dec	Year
Record high °C (°F)	16.4 (61.5)	21.5 (70.7)	24.0 (75.2)	26.7 (80.1)	31.4 (88.5)	33.1 (91.6)	35.8 (96.4)	35.5 (95.9)	29.7 (85.5)	26.3 (79.3)	18.3 (64.9)	16.6 (61.9)	35.8 (96.4)
Mean daily maximum °C (°F)	0.3 (32.5)	4.4 (39.9)	10.3 (50.5)	14.9 (58.8)	20.2 (68.4)	23.4 (74.1)	25.5 (77.9)	25.1 (77.2)	20.6 (69.1)	14.2 (57.6)	5.8 (42.4)	0.8 (33.4)	13.8 (56.8)
Daily mean °C (°F)	−4 (25)	−1.4 (29.5)	3.6 (38.5)	8.3 (46.9)	13.7 (56.7)	16.9 (62.4)	18.8 (65.8)	18.2 (64.8)	13.8 (56.8)	8.2 (46.8)	1.7 (35.1)	−2.7 (27.1)	7.9 (46.2)
Mean daily minimum °C (°F)	−7.2 (19.0)	−5.4 (22.3)	−1.3 (29.7)	2.8 (37.0)	7.8 (46.0)	11.1 (52.0)	12.9 (55.2)	12.7 (54.9)	9.0 (48.2)	4.3 (39.7)	−1 (30)	−5.2 (22.6)	3.4 (38.1)
Record low °C (°F)	−25.1 (−13.2)	−25.6 (−14.1)	−19.1 (−2.4)	−5.9 (21.4)	−2.2 (28.0)	1.9 (35.4)	3.0 (37.4)	3.4 (38.1)	−1.6 (29.1)	−8.9 (16.0)	−17.4 (0.7)	−28.1 (−18.6)	−28.1 (−18.6)
Average precipitation mm (inches)	30.9 (1.22)	35.2 (1.39)	50.2 (1.98)	64.5 (2.54)	78.5 (3.09)	113.5 (4.47)	117.6 (4.63)	98.6 (3.88)	89.7 (3.53)	82.9 (3.26)	78.9 (3.11)	48.9 (1.93)	889.4 (35.02)
Average snowfall cm (inches)	17.5 (6.9)	20.4 (8.0)	9.9 (3.9)	5.1 (2.0)	0.8 (0.3)	0.0 (0.0)	0.0 (0.0)	0.0 (0.0)	0.0 (0.0)	0.3 (0.1)	10.1 (4.0)	20.0 (7.9)	84.1 (33.1)
Average precipitation days (≥ 1.0 mm)	5.1	4.9	6.2	8.0	9.6	11.5	10.2	9.4	7.2	7.3	7.1	5.4	91.9
Average relative humidity (%) (at 14:00)	78.0	63.9	52.6	47.8	49.0	50.6	50.3	51.4	65.8	63.0	76.1	81.9	60.0
Mean monthly sunshine hours	78.8	123.0	158.3	175.2	212.5	217.5	241.2	233.0	180.5	125.6	66.0	57.4	1,869
Percentage possible sunshine	31.2	46.6	46.2	46.5	48.5	49.2	53.9	56.1	50.7	40.8	24.1	23.1	43.1
Source: Central Institute for Meteorology and Geodynamics

== Demographics ==
As of 2025, Klagenfurt had a population of 105,759.

Largest groups of foreign residents
Nationality	Population (2018)
Bosnia and Herzegovina	2,465
Germany	1,977
Croatia	1,695
Slovenia	1,342
Romania	832
Italy	650
Afghanistan	626

In 2019, there were around 20,000 people who were born outside the country living in Klagenfurt, corresponding to around 20% of the city's population. The majority of immigrants come from the Balkans and Germany.

== Sights ==
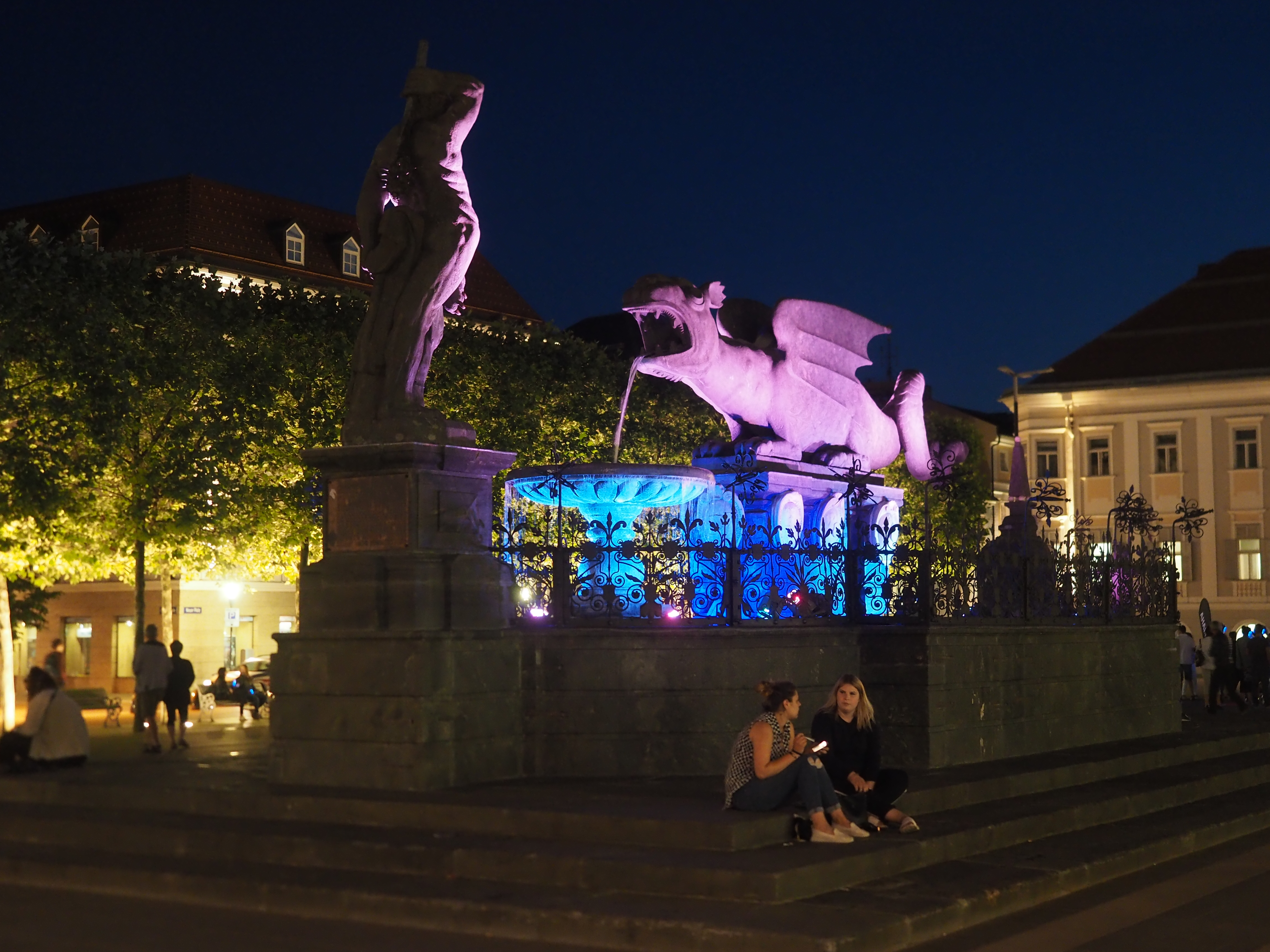
The Lindworm fountain is one of the most recognisable landmarks of the Klagenfurt city centre.

The Old City, with its central Alter Platz (Old Square) and the Renaissance buildings with their charming arcaded courtyards are a major attraction.

Notable landmarks also include:

- The Lindworm fountain of 1593, with a Hercules added in 1633
- Landhaus, Palace of the Estates, now the seat of the State Assembly
- the Baroque cathedral, built by the then Protestant Estates of Carinthia
- Viktring Abbey
- Wörthersee Stadion Football stadium
- Minimundus, the "small world on lake Wörthersee"
- The Kreuzbergl Nature Park, with a viewing tower and observatory
- The small but attractive botanical garden at the foot of Kreuzbergl, with a mining museum attached
- The University Campus at the city's west end, with the adjacent Lakeside Science & Technology Park
- Wörthersee (the warmest of the large Alpine lakes) with Europe's largest non-sea beach and lido, taking 12,000 bathers on a summer day
- Maria Loretto peninsula, with its newly renovated stately home (recently acquired by the city from the Carinithian noble family of the Rosenbergs)
- Tentschach and Hallegg castles

== Economy ==
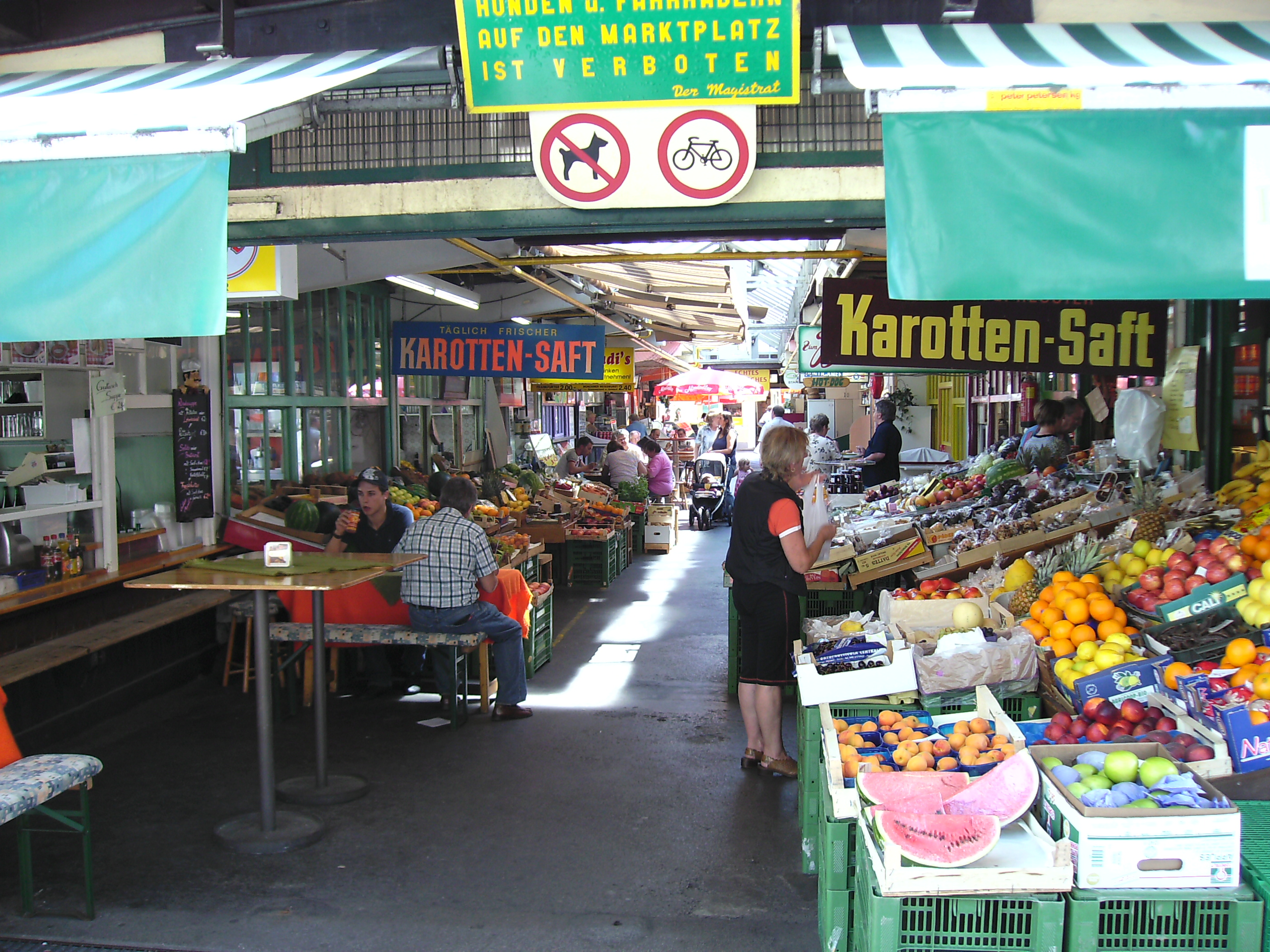
Benedikterplatz market

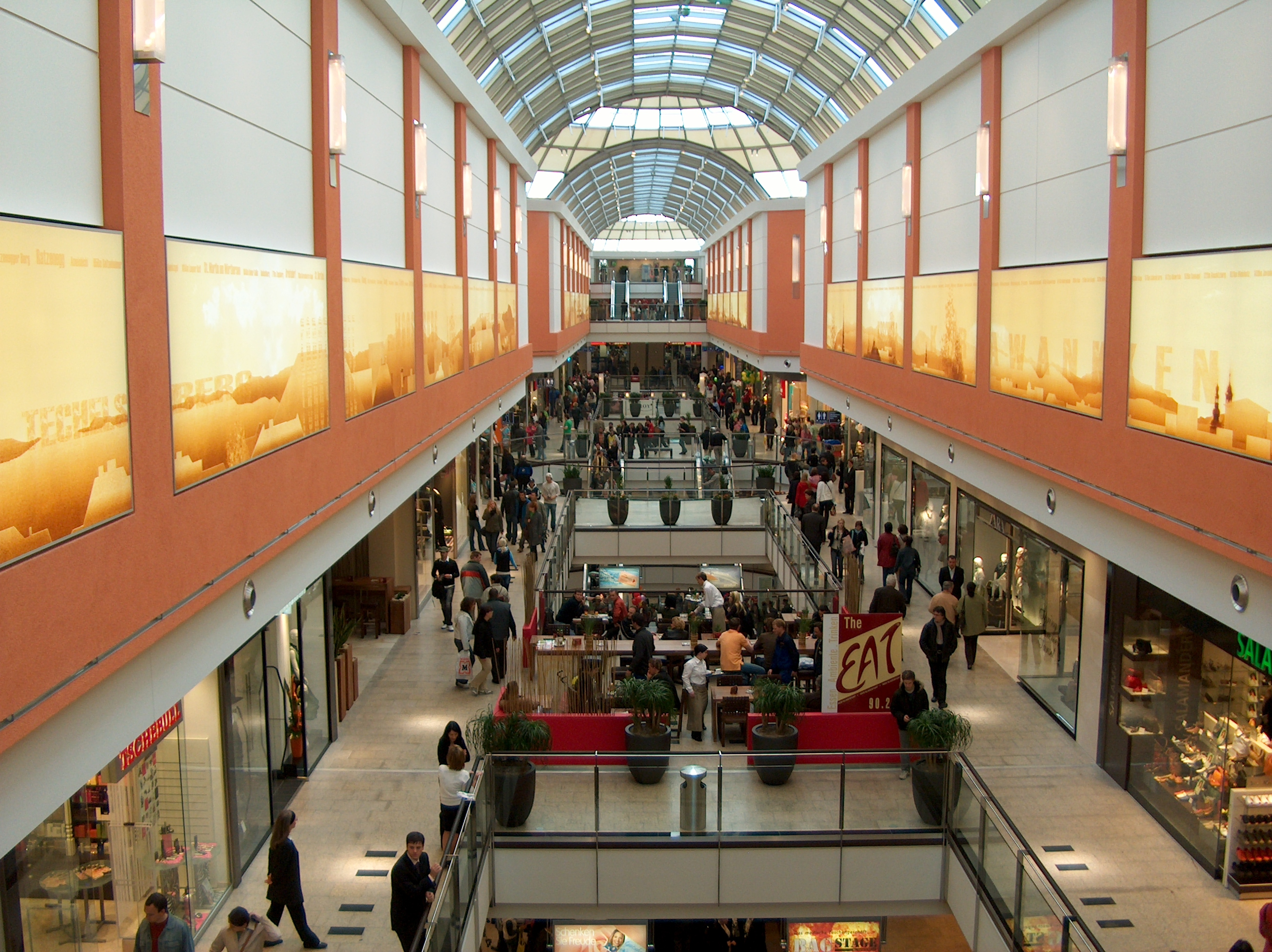
Interior of City-Arkaden

Klagenfurt is the economic centre of Carinthia, with 20% of the industrial companies. In May 2001, there were 63,618 employees in 6,184 companies here. 33 of these companies employed more than 200 people. The prevalent economic sectors are light industry, electronics, and tourism. There are also several printing offices.

The most important market place in Klagenfurt since 1948 is Benedikterplatz, formerly known as Herzogplatz. There is a market at Benediktenplatz twice a week with a diverse selection of food available for sale.

As well as the historical market, there are several shopping centres in Klagenfurt. The City-Arkaden shopping centre, founded in 2006, is located at the northern part of the city centre. The shopping centre has 120 businesses in a total floor area of 30 thousand square metres, and is one of the largest shopping centres in Carinthia. At the time of its foundation, it was one of the first shopping centres with a central arcade in the entire country of Austria.

The second-largest shopping centre in the city is Südpark, founded in 1998 and located near the Klagenfurt central station.

== Transport ==
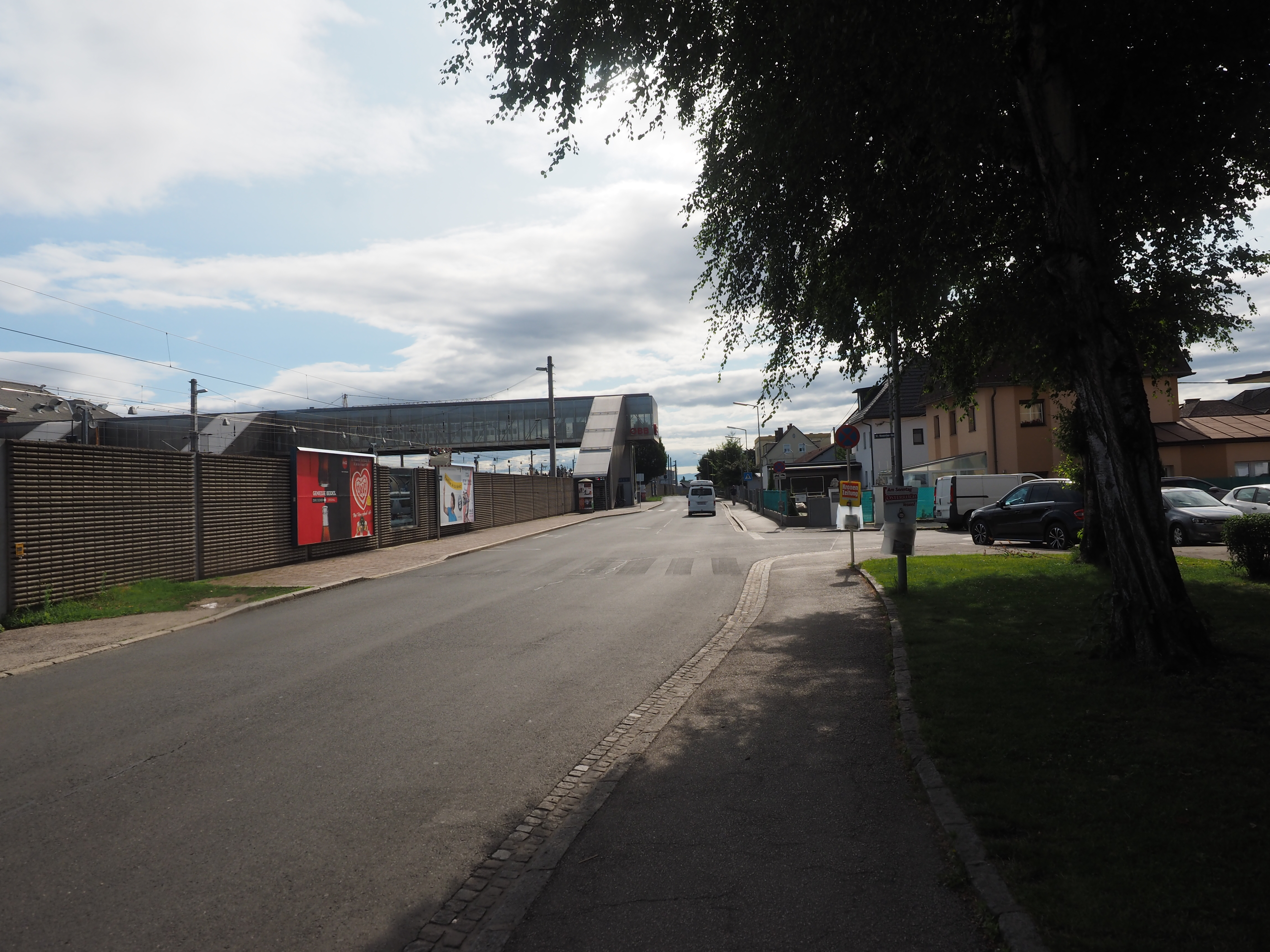
A view of Bahnstraße south of the centre of Klagenfurt, running along the far side of Klagenfurt central station

Klagenfurt Airport is a primary international airport with connections to several major European cities and holiday resorts abroad.

The city has the following train stations and stops that are integrated into the Carinthia S-Bahn system.

- Klagenfurt central station (German: Hauptbahnhof) REX 1
- Klagenfurt Annabichl
- Klagenfurt Ostbahnhof
- Klagenfurt Ebenthal REX 1
- Klagenfurt Lend
- Klagenfurt West
- Klagenfurt Süd

The lines shown are valid from the December 2025 timetable.

The city is situated at the intersection of the A2 and S37 motorways. The A2 autobahn runs from Vienna via Graz and Klagenfurt to Villach and further to the state border of Italy. The S37 freeway runs from Vienna via Bruck an der Mur and Sankt Veit an der Glan to Klagenfurt. The Loibl Pass highway B91 goes to Ljubljana, the capital of Slovenia, which is only 88 km (55 mi) from Klagenfurt.

The volume of traffic in Klagenfurt is high (motorisation level: 572 cars/1000 inhabitants in 2007). Service on the city's streetcar (tram) system, as well as its trolleybus system, ended in April 1963. In the 1960s, Klagenfurt was meant to become a car-friendly city, with many wide roads. A motorway was even planned which was to cross the city partly underground, but which now by-passes the city to the north. The problem of four railway lines from north, west, south, and east meeting at the central station south of the city centre and strangulating city traffic has been eased by a considerable number of underpasses on the main arteries. Nevertheless, despite 28 bus lines, traffic jams are frequent nowadays as in most cities of similar size. Ideas of a rapid transport system using the existing railway rails, of an elevated cable railway to the football stadium, or of a regular motorboat service on the Lend Canal from the city centre to the lake have not materialized. But for those who fancy leisurely travel there is a regular motorboat and steamer service on the lake connecting the resorts on Wörthersee. During severe winters, which no longer occur regularly, it might be faster to cross the frozen lake on skates.

== Culture ==
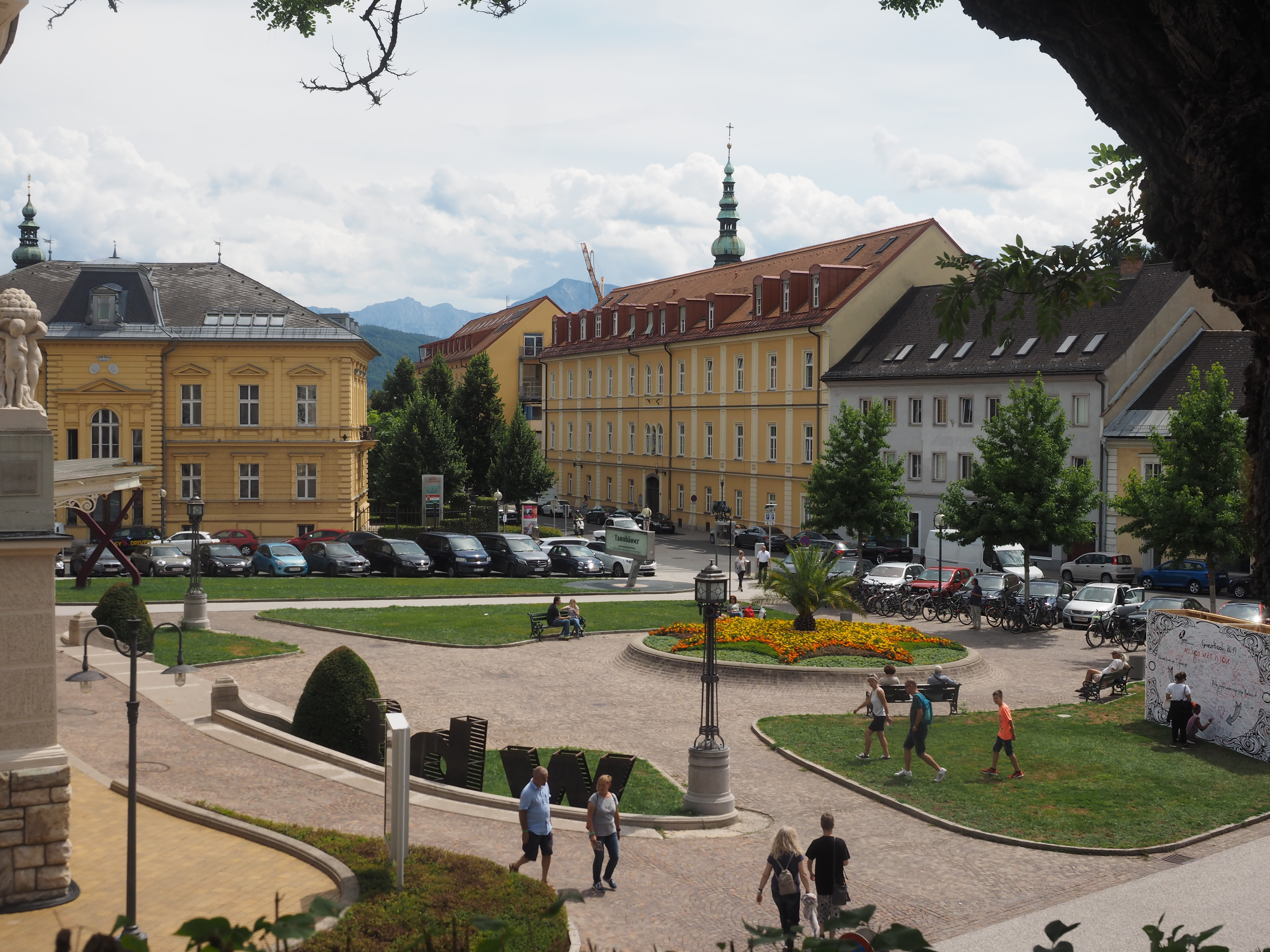
A square in front of the Stadttheater Klagenfurt in central Klagenfurt

There is a civic theatre-cum-opera house with professional companies, a professional symphony orchestra, a university of music and a concert hall. There are musical societies such as Musikverein (founded in 1826) or Mozartgemeinde, a private experimental theatre company, the State Museum for Carinthia, a modern art museum and the Diocesan museum of religious art; the Artists' House, two municipal and several private galleries, a planetarium in Europa Park, literary institutions such as the Robert Musil House, and a reputable German-literature competition awarding the prestigious Ingeborg Bachmann Prize.

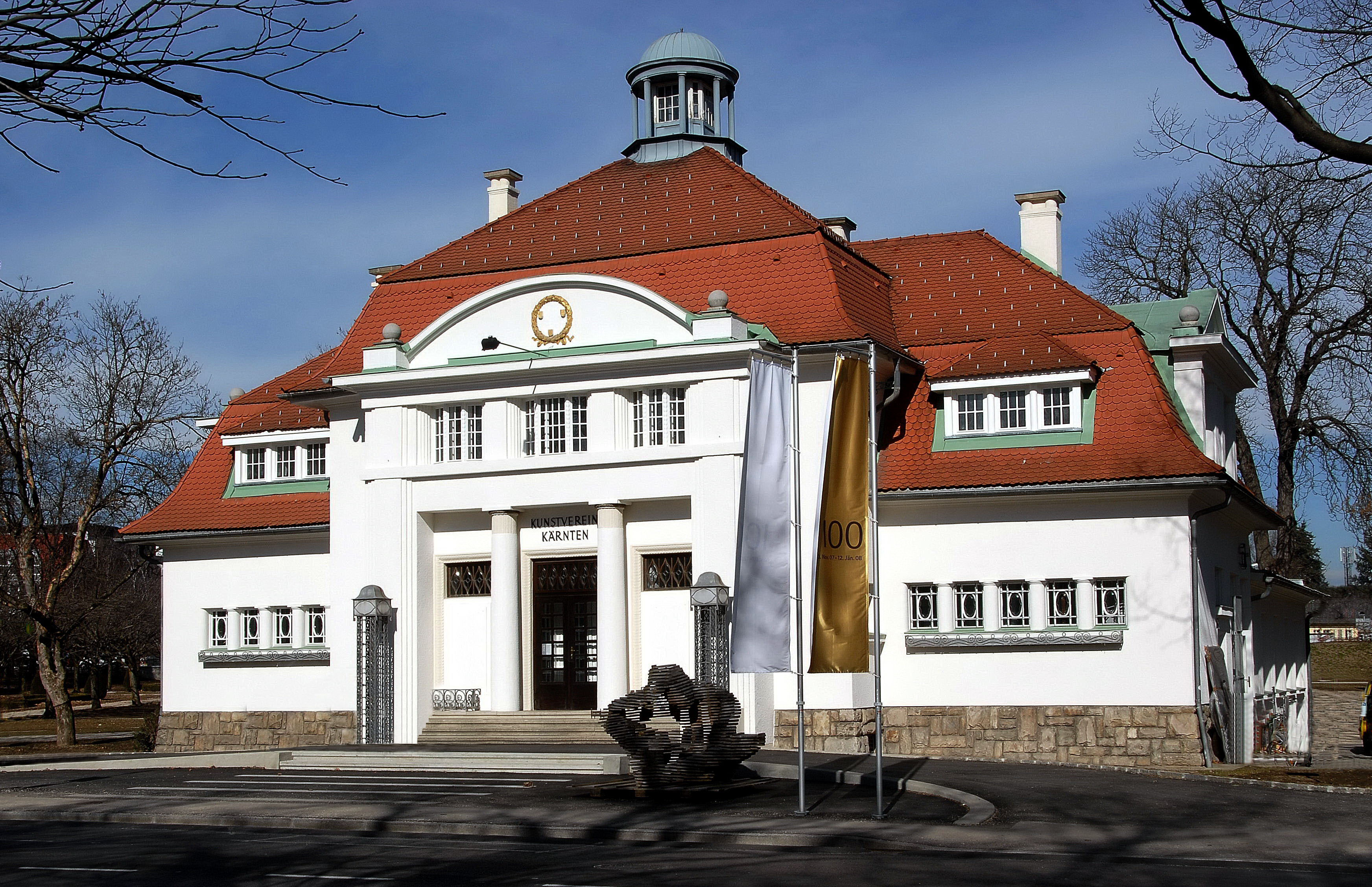
The Artists' House, 1913/14, Architect: Franz Baumgartner

Klagenfurt is the home of a number of small but fine publishing houses, and several papers or regional editions are also published here including dailies such as Kleine Zeitung and Kärntner Krone.

Klagenfurt is a popular vacation spot, with mountains both to the south and north, numerous parks and a series of 23 stately homes and castles on its outskirts. In summer, the city is home to the Altstadtzauber (The Magic of the Old City) festival.

Several Carinthian Slovene cultural and political associations are also based in the city, including the Hermagoras Society, the oldest Slovene publishing house founded in Klagenfurt in 1851.

=== Annual events ===
Klagenfurt hosts several events annually.

- Annual lectures and discussions of the international Ingeborg Bachmann awards ceremony for literature.
- Annual international summer music concert and Gustav Mahler awards ceremony at the former monastery in Viktring.
- "Wörtheresee Classics" festival at the concert house.
- World Bodypainting Festival, the most famous body painting festival in the world, held at the Norbert Artner park in July.
- The so-called "Kontaktna-leča – Kontaklinse-Festival" youth culture organised by Slovenian students, held in Klagenfurt since 1981.
- "Altstadtzauber" ("Old Town Magic") music and arts festival on the second weekend of August.
- The so-called Klagenfurt Festival held since 2020.
- A Christmas market held annually at Christmas time.

== Education ==
The city is home to the University of Klagenfurt and hosts a campus of the Fachhochschule Kärnten (Carinthia University of Applied Sciences), a college of education for primary and secondary teacher training and further education of teachers as well as a college of general further education (VHS) and two institutions of further professional and vocational education (WIFI and BFI). Among other Austrian educational institutions, there is a Slovene language Gymnasium (established in 1957) and a Slovene language commercial high school.

=== Tertiary ===
- University of Klagenfurt
- Klagenfurt Campus of Fachhochschule (FH) Kärnten, Carinthia University of Applied Sciences (CUAS)
- Pädagogische Hochschule Viktor Frankl, a college of education
- Health Science Centre with Academy for Midwifery and hospital-based Nursing school at the Klagenfurt State Hospital
- Gustav Mahler University of Music

=== Secondary ===
A number of general high schools such as

- Europa-Gymnasium, Austria's second-oldest
- BG/BRG Mössingerstraße
- BRG Klagenfurt-Viktring with emphasis on arts (music and drawing)
- ORG St. Ursula, a private Catholic institutionf
- Federal Gymnasium for Slovenes

and senior high schools offering general-cum-professional education:

- Two schools of Engineering: HTL Lastenstrasse and HTL Mössingerstraße
- Two commercial high schools: Handelsakademie No. 1 and No. 2
- a Slovene-language Commercial High School ("Handelsakademie")
- a high school of catering, fashion and design
- a school of pre-school education
- a school of Alpine agriculture and nutrition science
- a school of social management of the Caritas charity

=== Further education ===
- College of Further Education Volkshochschule
- Technical Training Institute of the Trade unions, Berufsförderungsinstitut (BFI)
- Technical Training Institute of the Chamber of commerce, Wirtschaftsförderungsinstitut (WIFI)
- evening schools (Gymnasium and Schools of Mechanical and Electrical Engineering)

=== Others ===
- Waldorf School
- a school for social workers operated by the Austrian Caritas Charity
- Carinthian State school of Fire Control

== Sports ==
The ice hockey team EC KAC (Eishockey Club Klagenfurter Athletiksport Club) has won the top level Austrian Championship 30 times since its founding in 1909.

The Bundesliga football club SK Austria Kärnten was based in Klagenfurt, with their second-tier phoenix club Austria Klagenfurt also playing there.

Klagenfurt hosts the Start/Finish of the Austrian Ironman Contest, 3.8 km (2 3/8 mi) swim, 180 km (112 mi) cycling, and a 42 km (26 mi) run, part of the WTC Ironman series, which culminates in the Hawaii World Championships.

The World Rowing Championships were held on the Wörthersee in 1969.

The 2016 Beach Volleyball Major Series took place in Klagenfurt on 26–31 July.

Klagenfurt hosted three games during the UEFA Euro 2008 in the recently rebuilt Wörthersee Stadion. Klagenfurt was also a contender for the 2006 Winter Olympics and is home to an American football team, the Carinthian Black Lions, competing in the First League of the Austrian Football League. The Black Lions attract fans from all over Carinthia, playing home games in both Klagenfurt and Villach.

== Notable natives and residents ==
=== Nobility, soldiers and diplomats ===
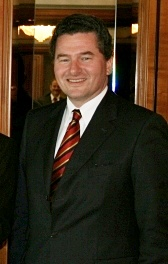
Prince Stefan of Liechtenstein, 2008

- Bernhard von Spanheim (1176 or 1181 – 1256), House of Sponheim, was Duke of Carinthia for 54 years from 1202
- Maximilian Daublebsky von Sterneck (1829–1897), Admiral Austro-Hungarian Navy
- Prince Ludwig Gaston of Saxe-Coburg and Gotha (1870 in Ebenthal – 1942 in Innsbruck), prince of the House of Saxe-Coburg and Gotha-Koháry lived in Brazil until 1889
- Countess Lucy Christalnigg von und zu Gillitzstein (1872–1914), Red Cross worker and motor racing driver
- Hanns Albin Rauter (1895–1949), SS-general in Nazi-occupied Netherlands, executed war criminal
- Odilo Globocnik (1904–1945), a leading Nazi official, born in Trieste, but later resided in Klagenfurt
- Ernst Lerch (1914–1997), ran Operation Reinhard, the mass murder of Jews in the General Government
- Wolfgang Petritsch (born 1947), diplomat, former UN High Representative for Bosnia and Herzegovina
- Valentin Inzko (born 1949), diplomat, Carinthian Slovene, High Representative for Bosnia and Herzegovina
- Ursula Plassnik (born 1956), diplomat and politician, Foreign Minister of Austria from 2004 to 2008
- Prince Stefan of Liechtenstein (born 1961), Liechtenstein's Ambassador Extraordinary and Plenipotentiary to Germany

=== Public service ===
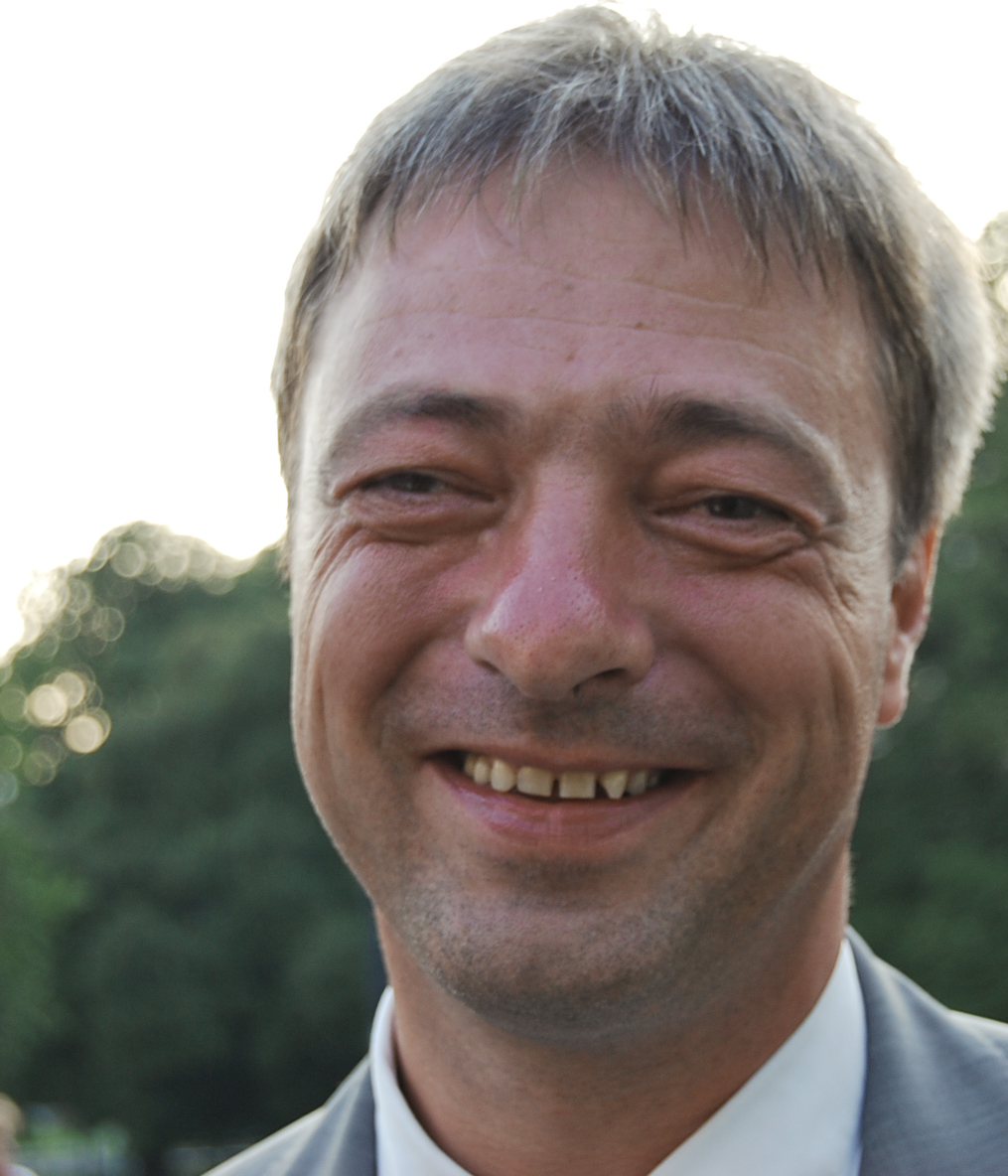
Rudi Vouk, 2008

- John of Viktring (ca. 1270–1347), late medieval chronicler and political advisor to the Duchy of Carinthia
- Jurij Japelj (1744–1807), Slovene Jesuit priest, translator, and philologist
- Matija Majar (1809–1892), Carinthian Slovene RC priest and political activist, went to school in Klagenfurt
- Andrej Einspieler (1813–1888), Slovene politician, RC priest, journalist, "father of the Carinthian Slovenes"
- Anton Janežič (1828–1869), Carinthian Slovene linguist, philologist, literary historian, went to school in Klagenfurt
- Emanuel Herrmann (1839–1902), national economist, originated the pre-paid postal card
- Felix Ermacora (1923–1995), human rights expert
- Heinz Nittel (1931–1981), politician in Vienna's city administration, murdered
- Karl Matthäus Woschitz (born 1937 in Sankt Margareten im Rosental), Austrian theologian and bible scholar
- Rudi Vouk (born 1965), lawyer, politician, human rights activist

=== Science and architecture ===
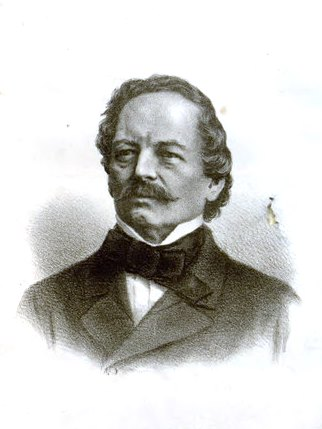
Friedrich Welwitsch. 1863

- Lorenz Chrysanth von Vest (1776–1840), physician and botanist
- Friedrich Welwitsch (1806 in Maria Saal – 1872), explorer, botanist, discovered Welwitschia mirabilis.
- Josef Stefan (1835–1893), Carinthian Slovene physicist, mathematician, poet of the Austrian Empire
- Hubert Leitgeb (1835 in Portendorf – 1888), botanist
- Gustav Gugitz (1836–1882), architect
- Markus von Jabornegg (1837–1910), government official, botanist
- Roland Rainer (1910–2004), architect
- Hubert Petschnigg (1913–1997), architect
- Karl Robatsch (1929–2000), botanist and chess player
- Günther Domenig (1934–2012), architect
- Hermann Mittelberger (1935–2004), Indo-Europeanist
- Peter Manfred Gruber (born 1941), mathematician working in geometric number theory
- Helmut Wautischer (born 1954), philosopher, senior philosophy lecturer at Sonoma State University
- Andreas Bernkop-Schnürch (born 1965), scientist, pharmacist, entrepreneur, inventor and professor
- Markus Müller (born 1967), pharmacologist
- Ingo Zechner (born 1972), philosopher and historian

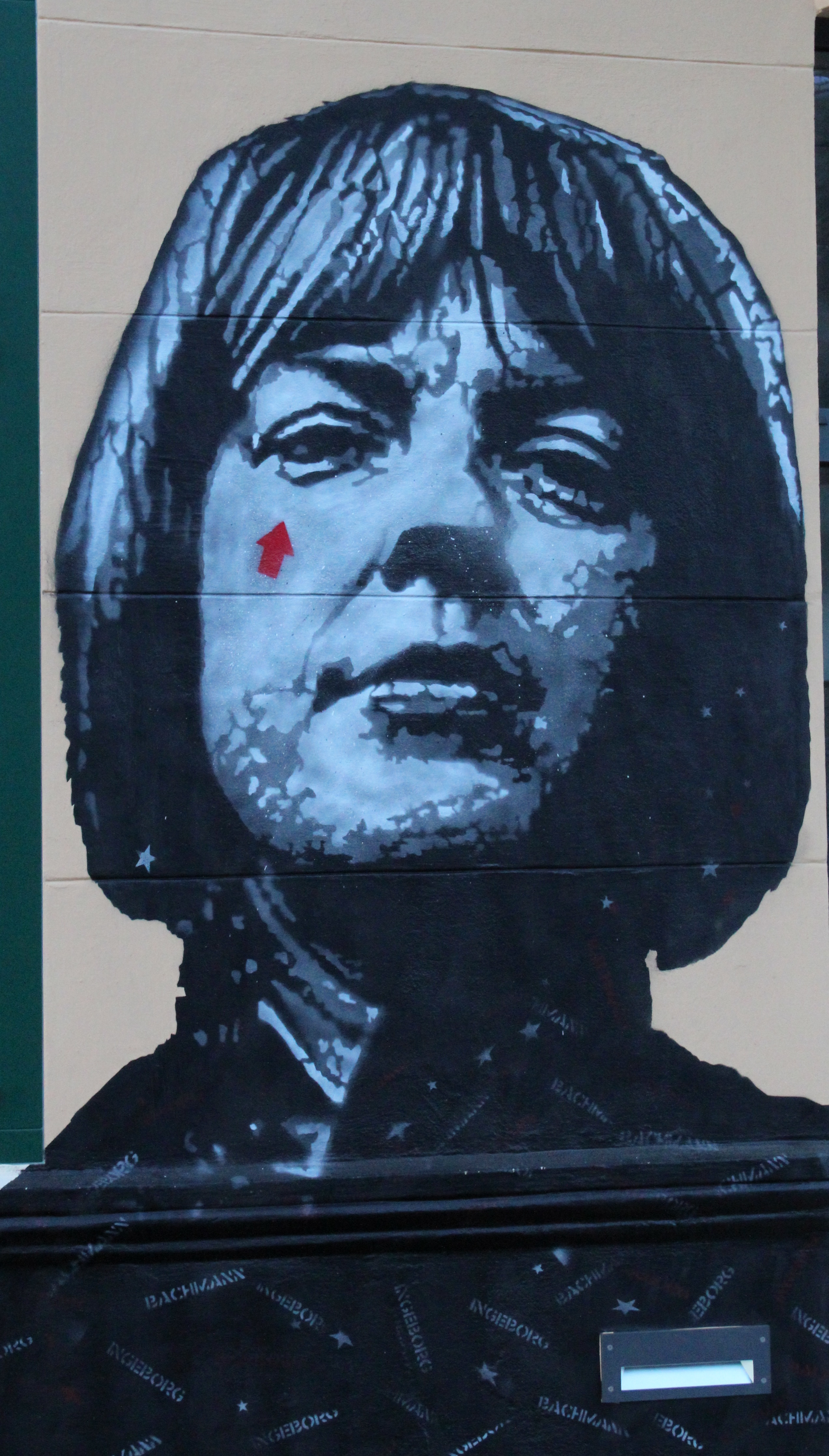
Graffiti portrait of Ingeborg Bachmann, 2011

=== Writers ===
- Robert Musil (1880–1942), philosophical writer
- Wolf In der Maur (1924–2005), journalist and editor
- Ingeborg Bachmann (1926–1973), poet and author
- Ernst Alexander Rauter (1929–2006), author, journalist and language critic
- Gert Jonke (1946–2009), poet, playwright and novelist
- Vinko Ošlak (born 1947), Slovene author, essayist, translator, columnist and esperantist, lived in Klagenfurt
- Antonia Rados (born 1953), television journalist working for RTL Television
- Monika Czernin (born 1965), writer, screenwriter and film director
- Isabella Krassnitzer (born 1967), journalist, radio and television presenter

=== Musicians ===
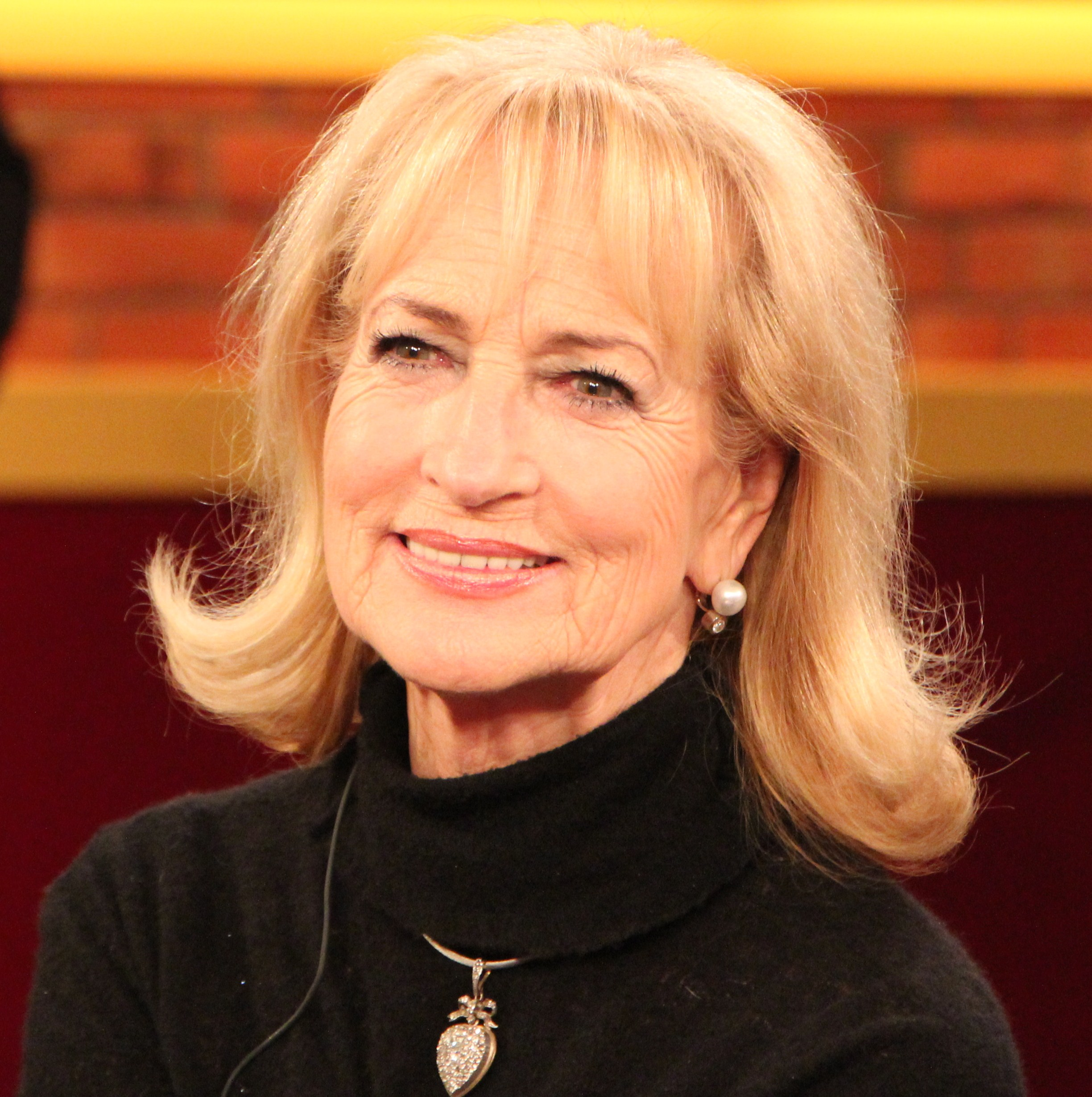
Dagmar Koller, 2011

- Konrad Ragossnig (born 1932), classical guitarist and lutenist
- Udo Jürgens (1934–2014), Austrian-Swiss singer, won the Eurovision Song Contest 1966
- Dagmar Koller (born 1939), singer and actress
- Penny McLean (born Gertrude Wirschinger 1948), singer in Silver Convention
- Wolfgang Puschnig (born 1956), jazz musician (saxophone, flute, bass clarinet) and composer
- Christopher Hinterhuber (born 1973), classical pianist
- Benjamin Ziervogel (born 1983), violinist, concertmaster of RTV Slovenia Symphony Orchestra
- Anna Kohlweis (born 1984), singer-songwriter and artist, also known as Paper Bird and Squalloscope
- Naked Lunch, a band from Klagenfurt founded in 1991, started as an alternative rock band

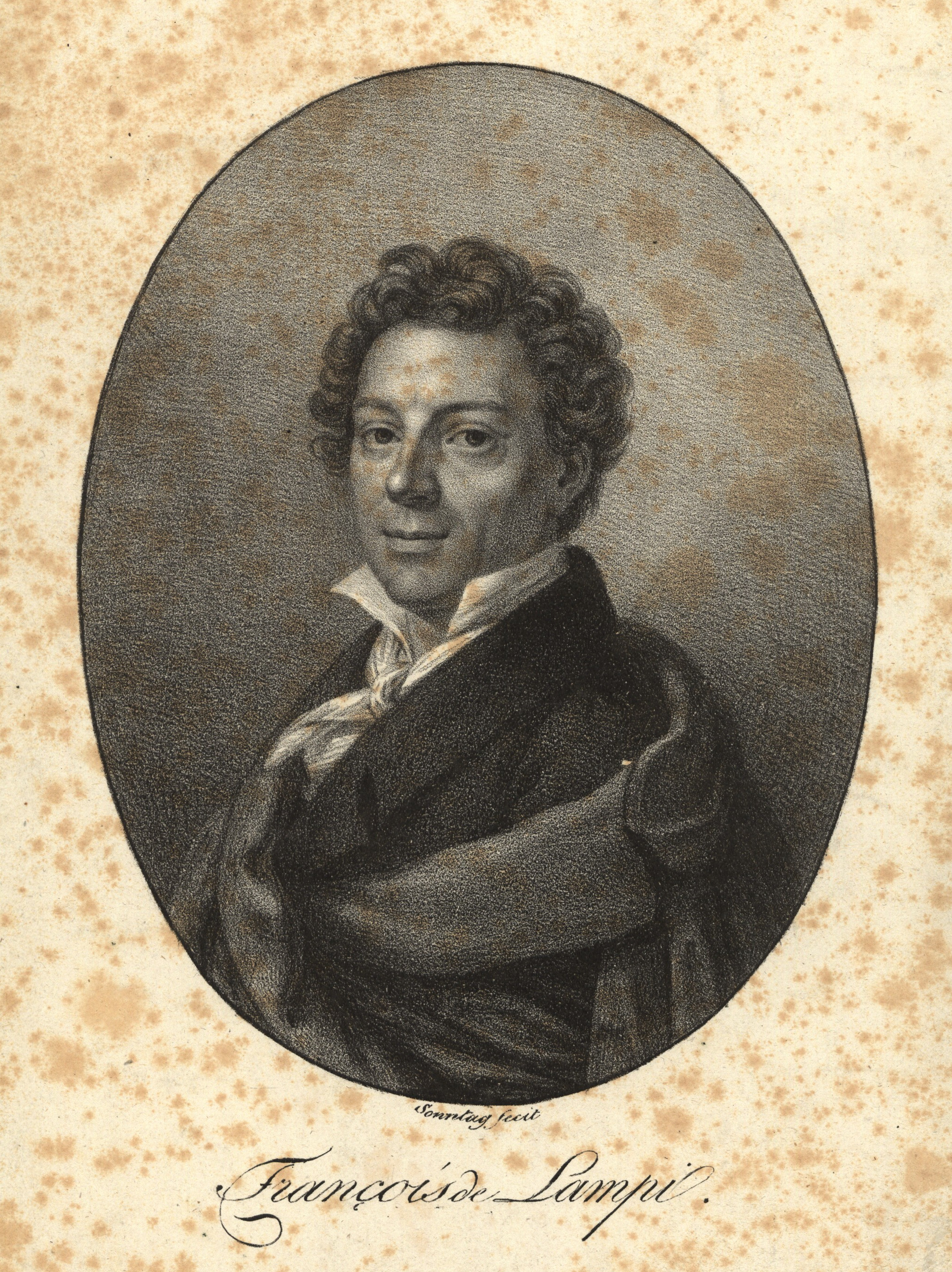
Franciszek Ksawery Lampi, 1834

=== Arts ===
- Franciszek Ksawery Lampi (1782–1852), Polish Romantic painter
- Fredy Malec Koschitz(1914–2001), Slovenian painter and woodcarver
- Mirella Bentivoglio (born 1922–2017), Italian sculptor, poet, performance artist and curator
- Wolfgang Hollegha (born 1929=2023), painter
- Hannes Heinz Goll (1934–1999), sculptor, printmaker and painter, worked mainly in Colombia
- James Aubrey (1947–2010), British actor
- Sissy Höfferer (born 1955), television actress
- Danny Nucci (born 1968), Italian-American actor
- Maria Petschnig (born 1977), artist and filmmaker
- Larissa-Antonia Marolt (born 1992), fashion model and actress

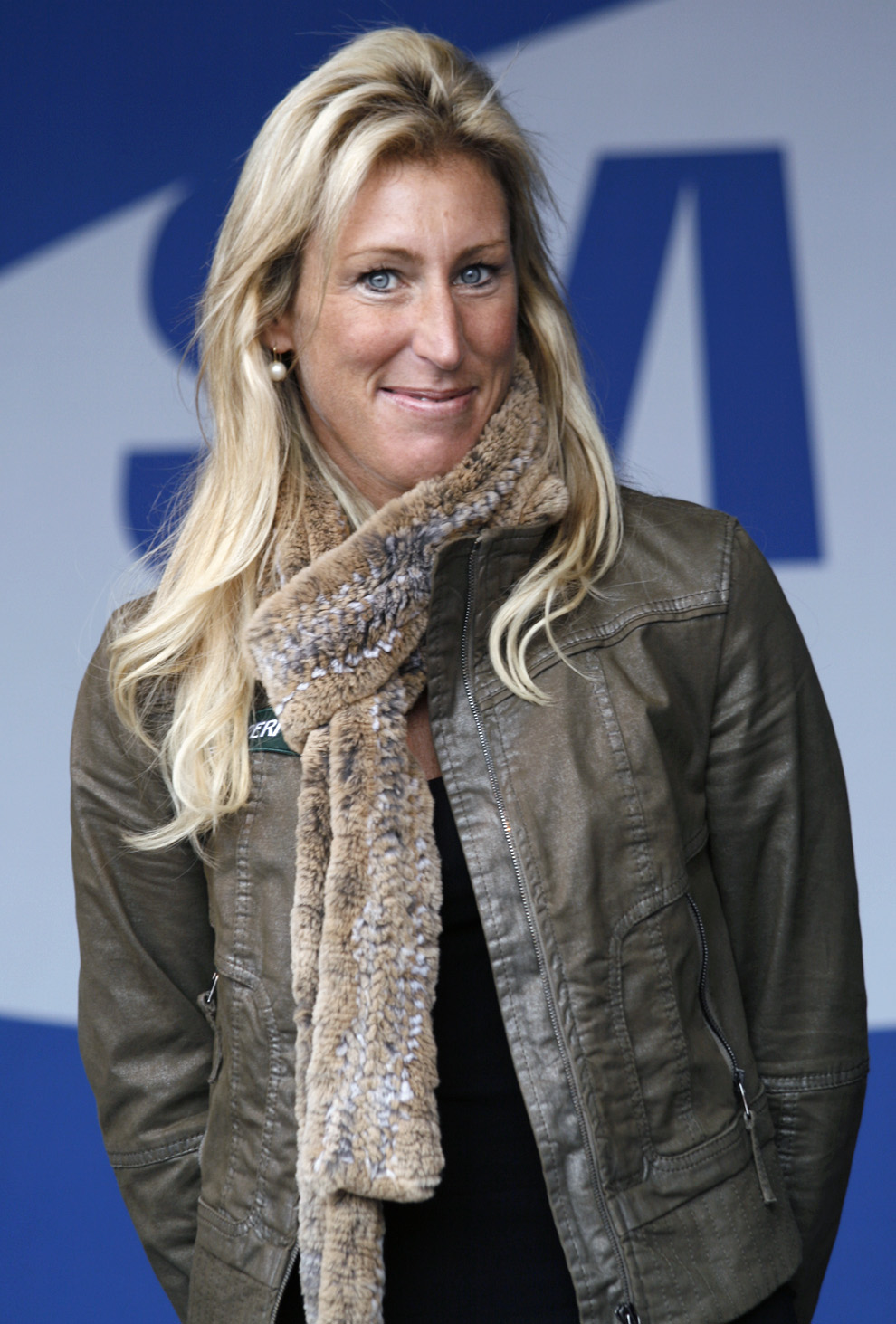
Stephanie Graf, 2008

=== Sport ===
- Andre Burakovsky (born 1995), ice hockey player
- Rosa Donner (born 2003), competitive sailor
- Stephanie Graf (born 1973), former middle-distance runner
- Dieter Kalt, Jr. (born 1974), former professional ice hockey player
- Stefan Lexa (born 1976), retired football player, played 454 games
- Stefan Koubek (born 1977), retired tennis player
- Jasmin Ouschan (born 1986), professional women's champion pool player
- Thomas Pöck (born 1981), ice hockey player
- Horst Skoff (1968–2008), professional tennis player
- Peter Scharmann (born 1950), racing driver

== Gallery ==
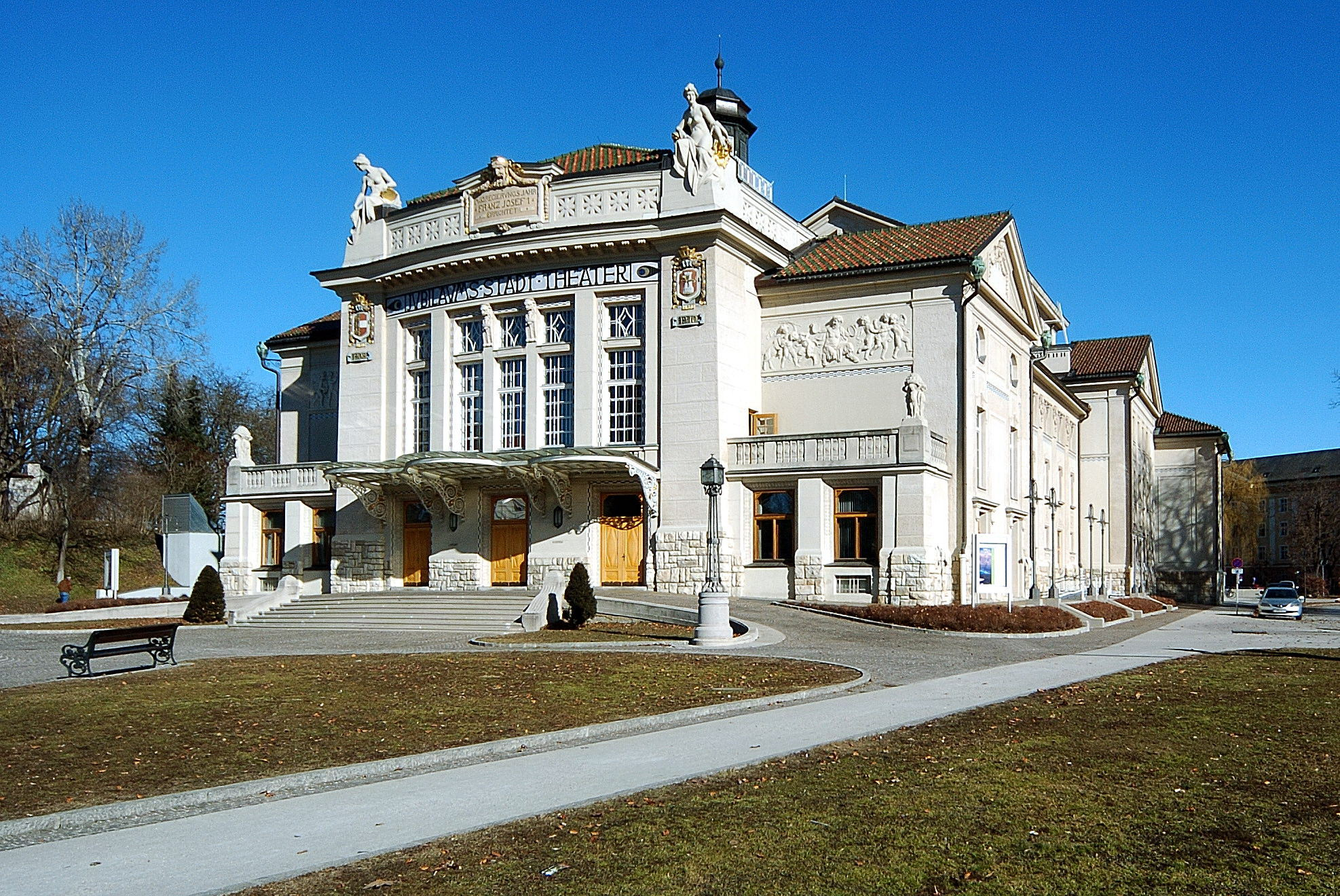
Civic Theatre and Opera

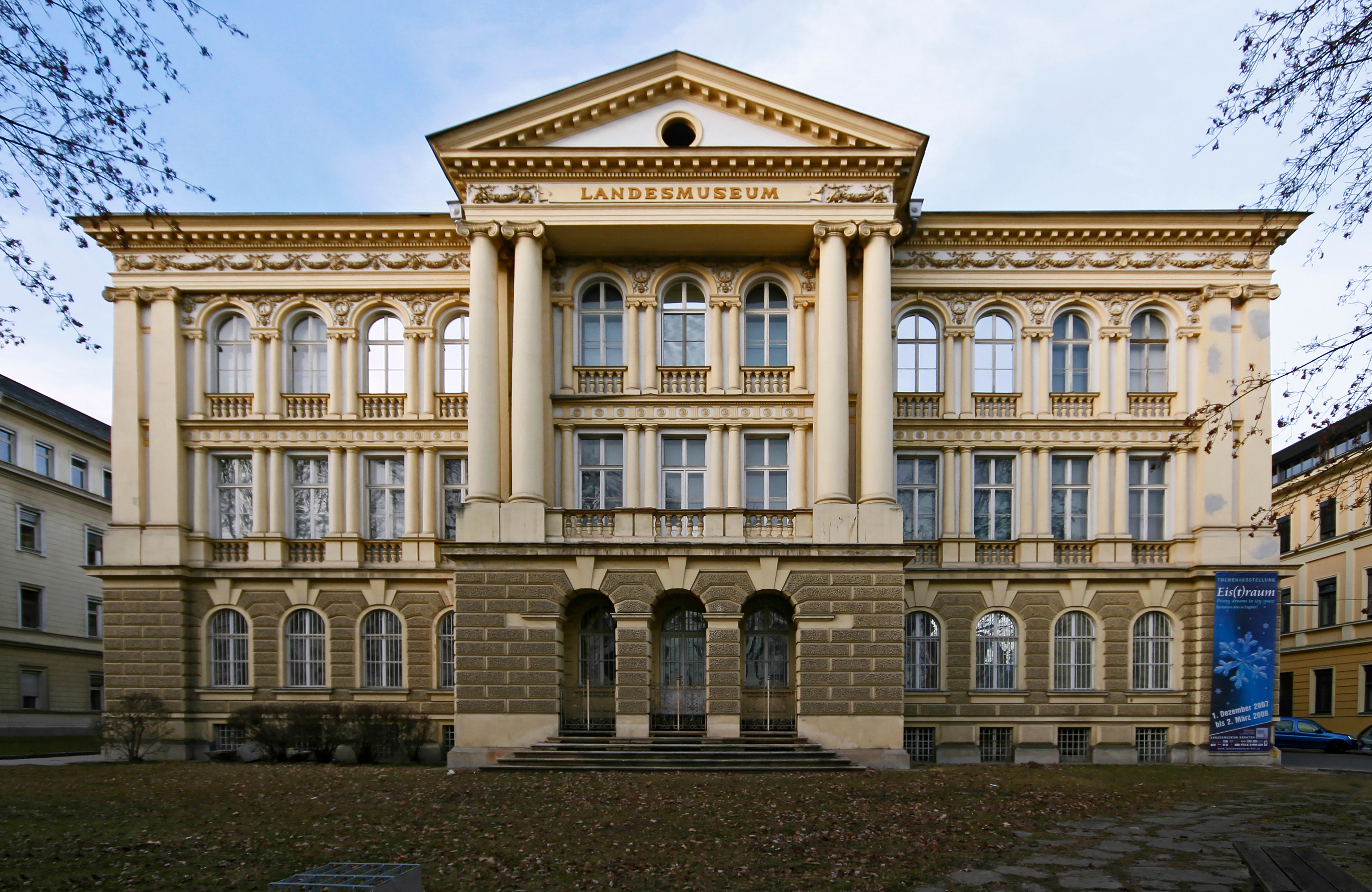
State Museum of Carinthia

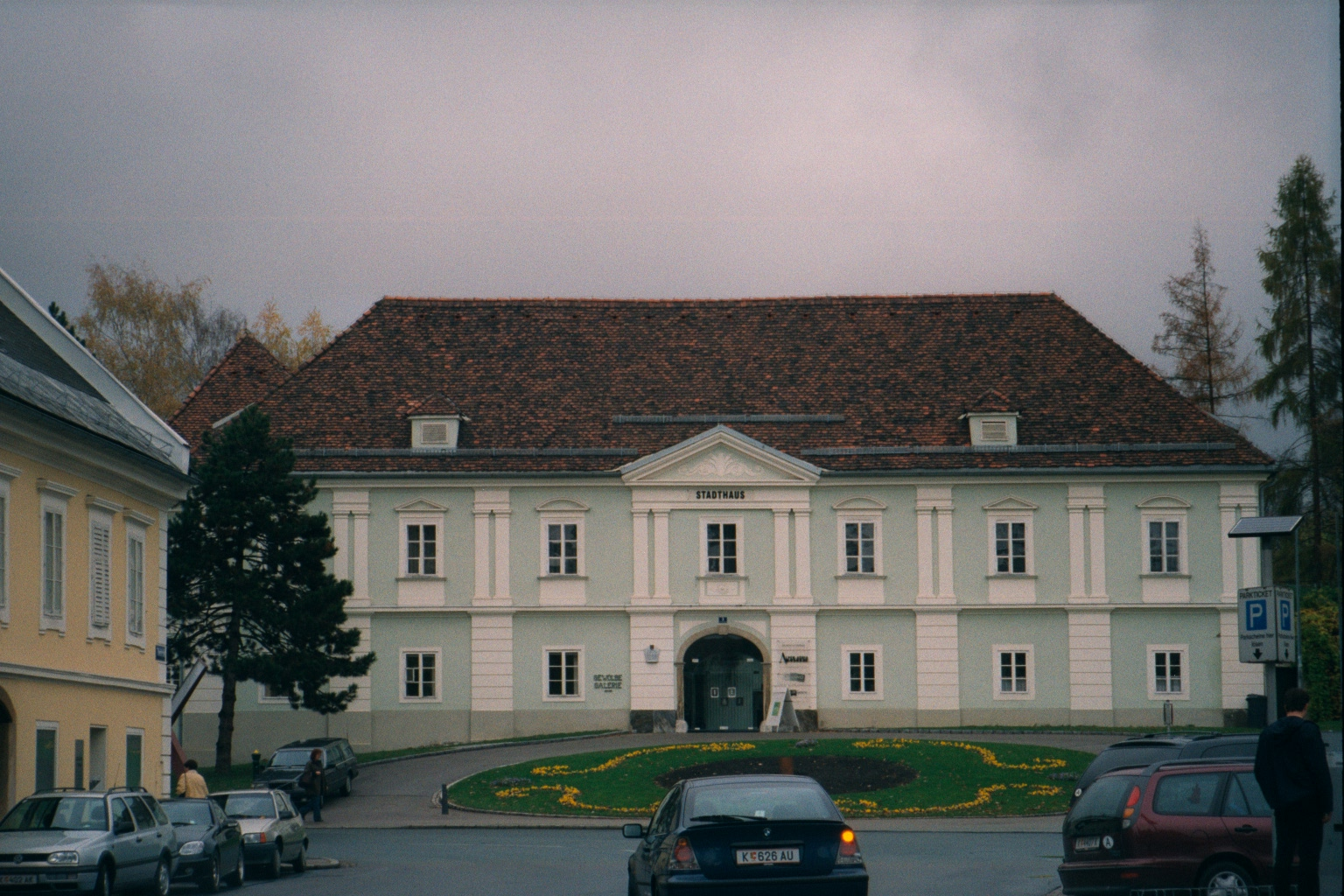
The Stadthaus

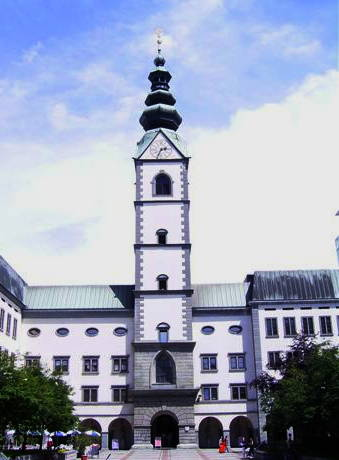
Klagenfurt Cathedral

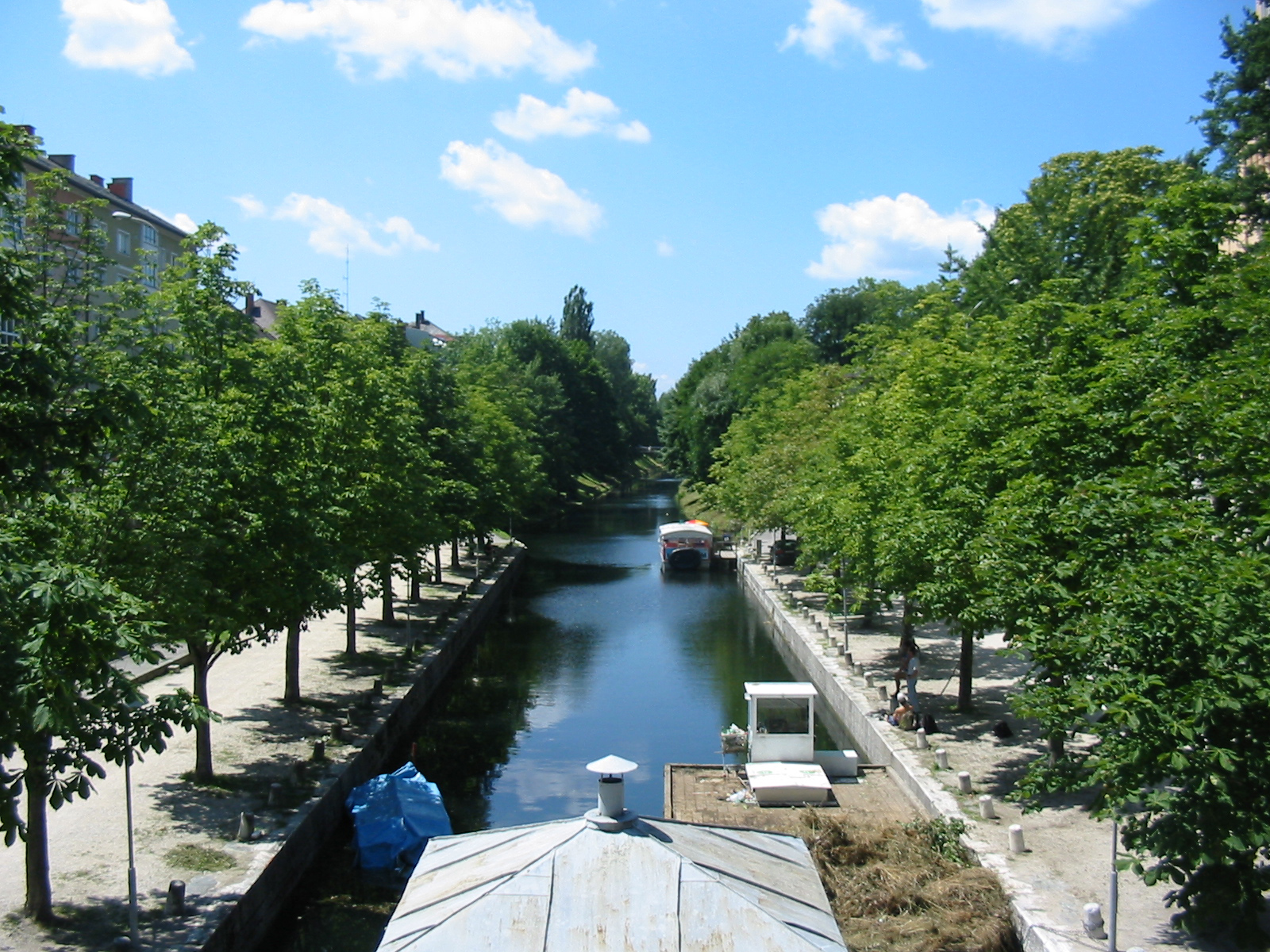
Lend canal in the centre of Klagenfurt

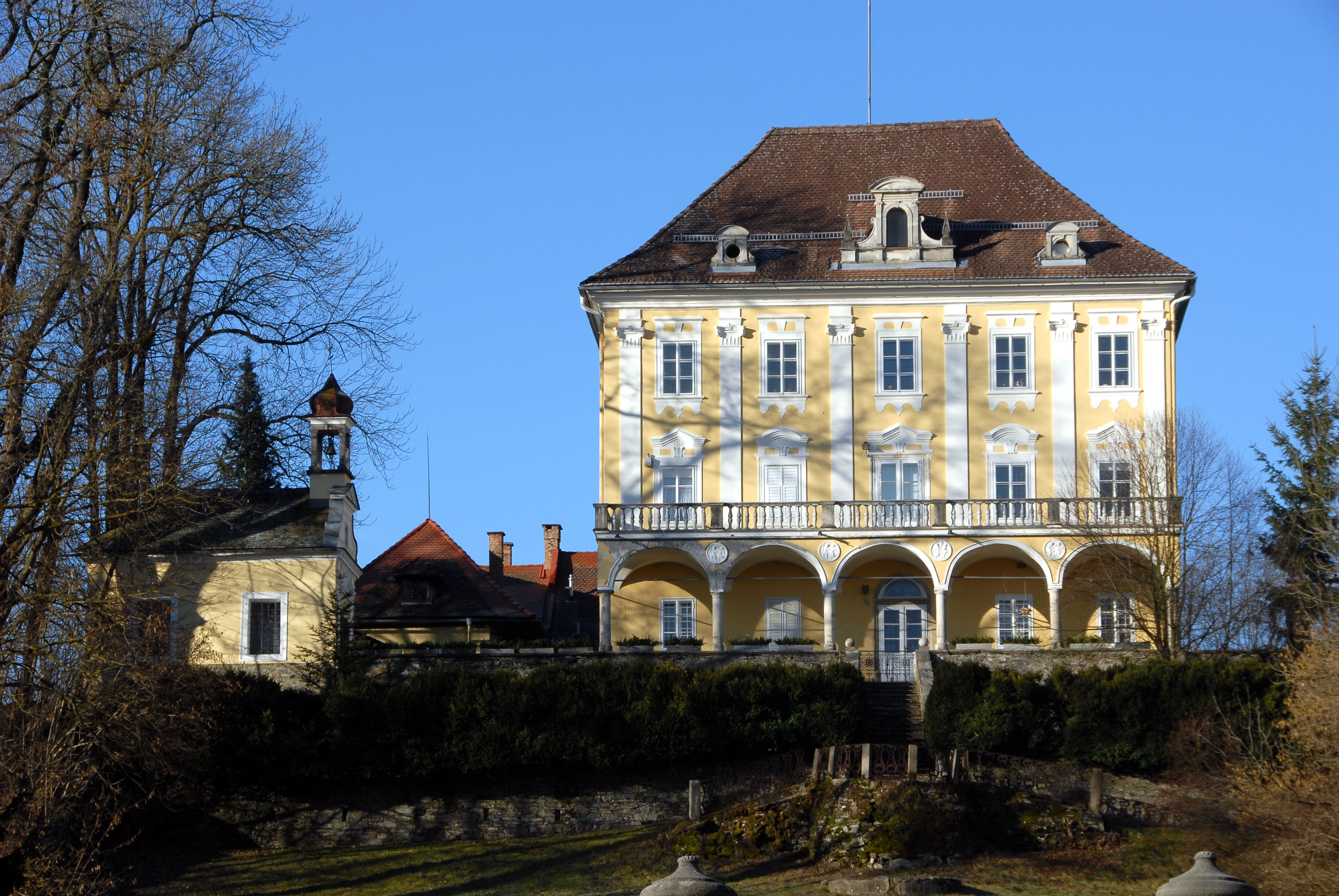
Annabichl Manor

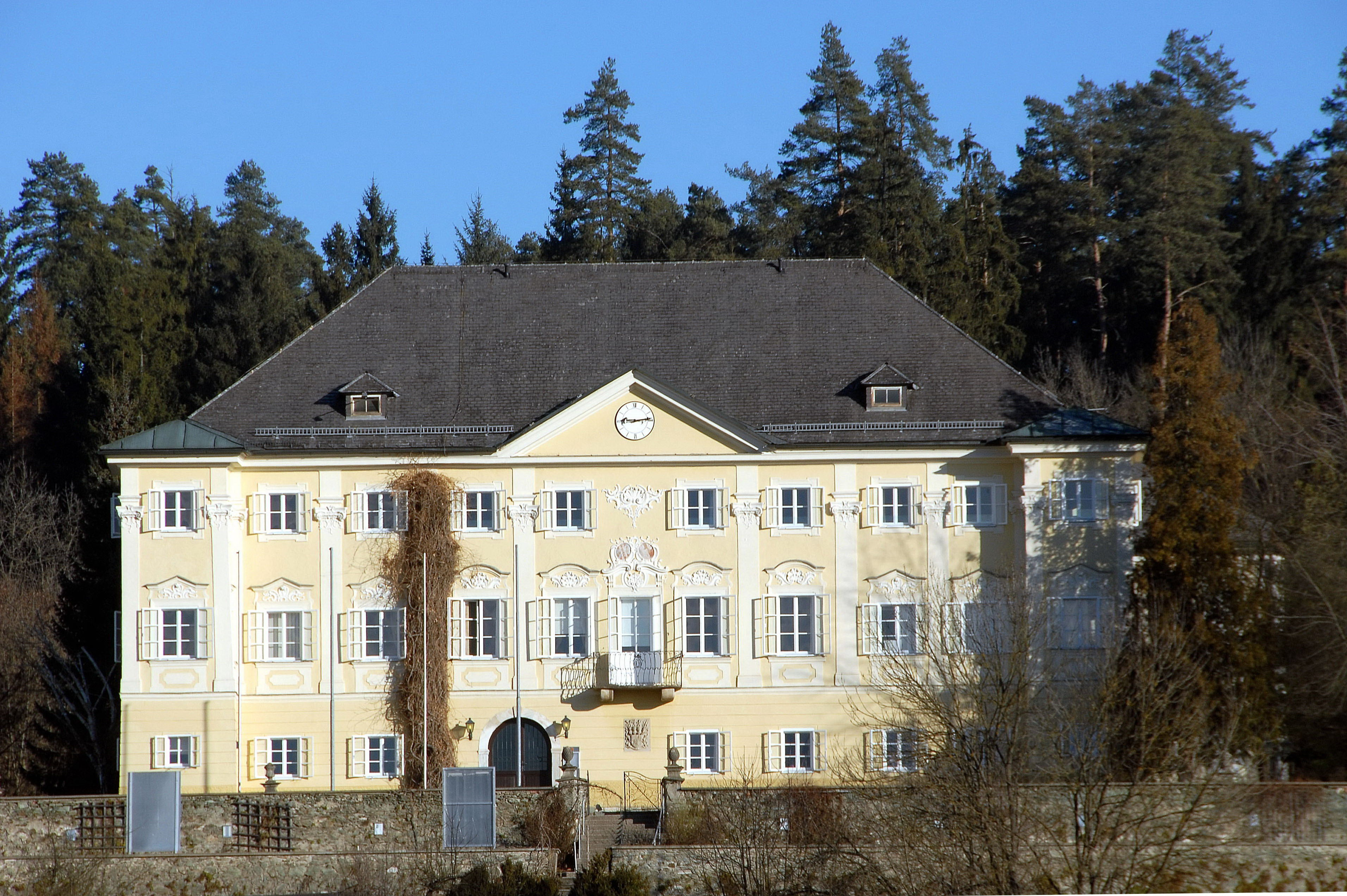
Ehrental Manor

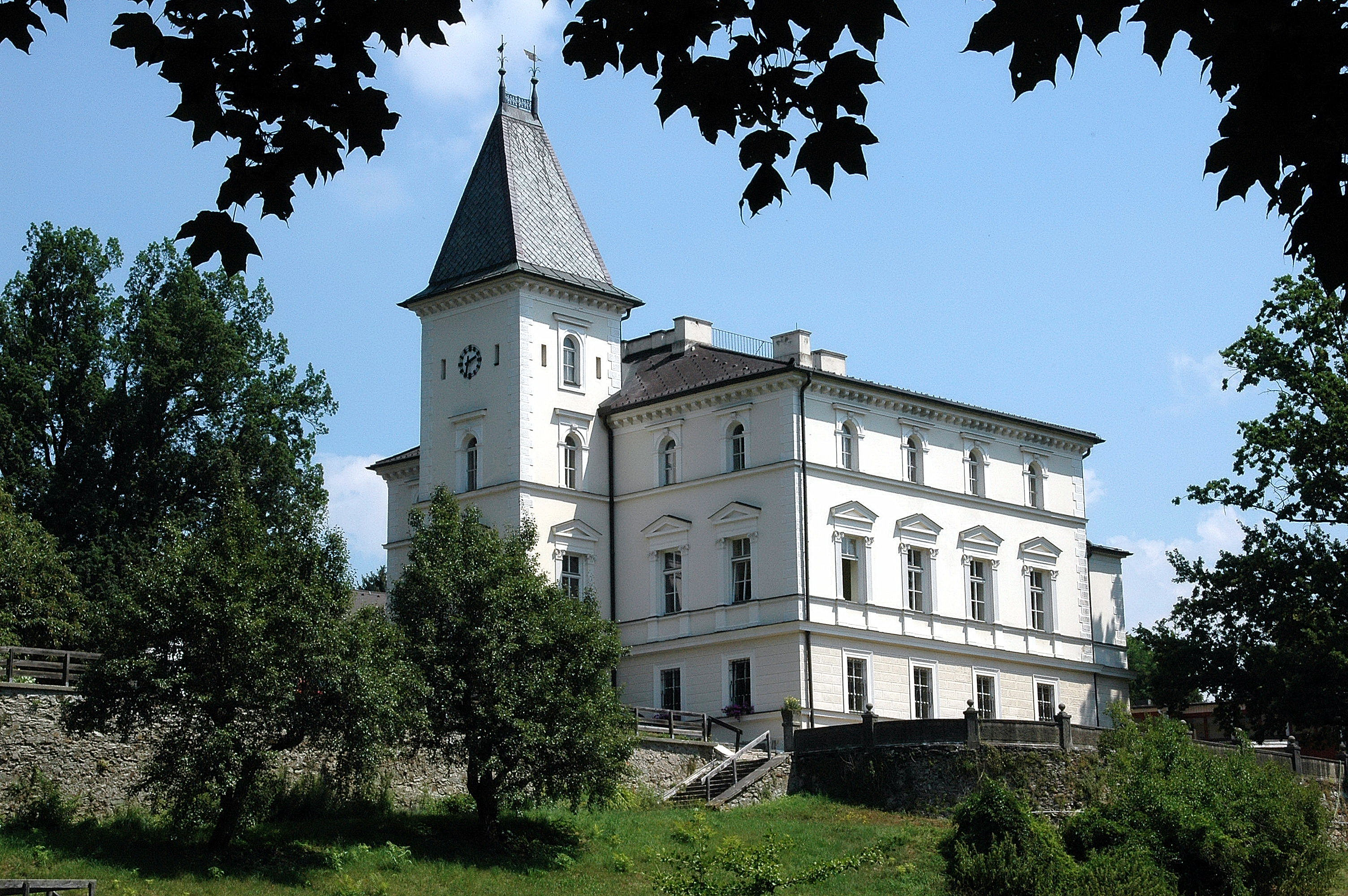
Krastowitz Manor

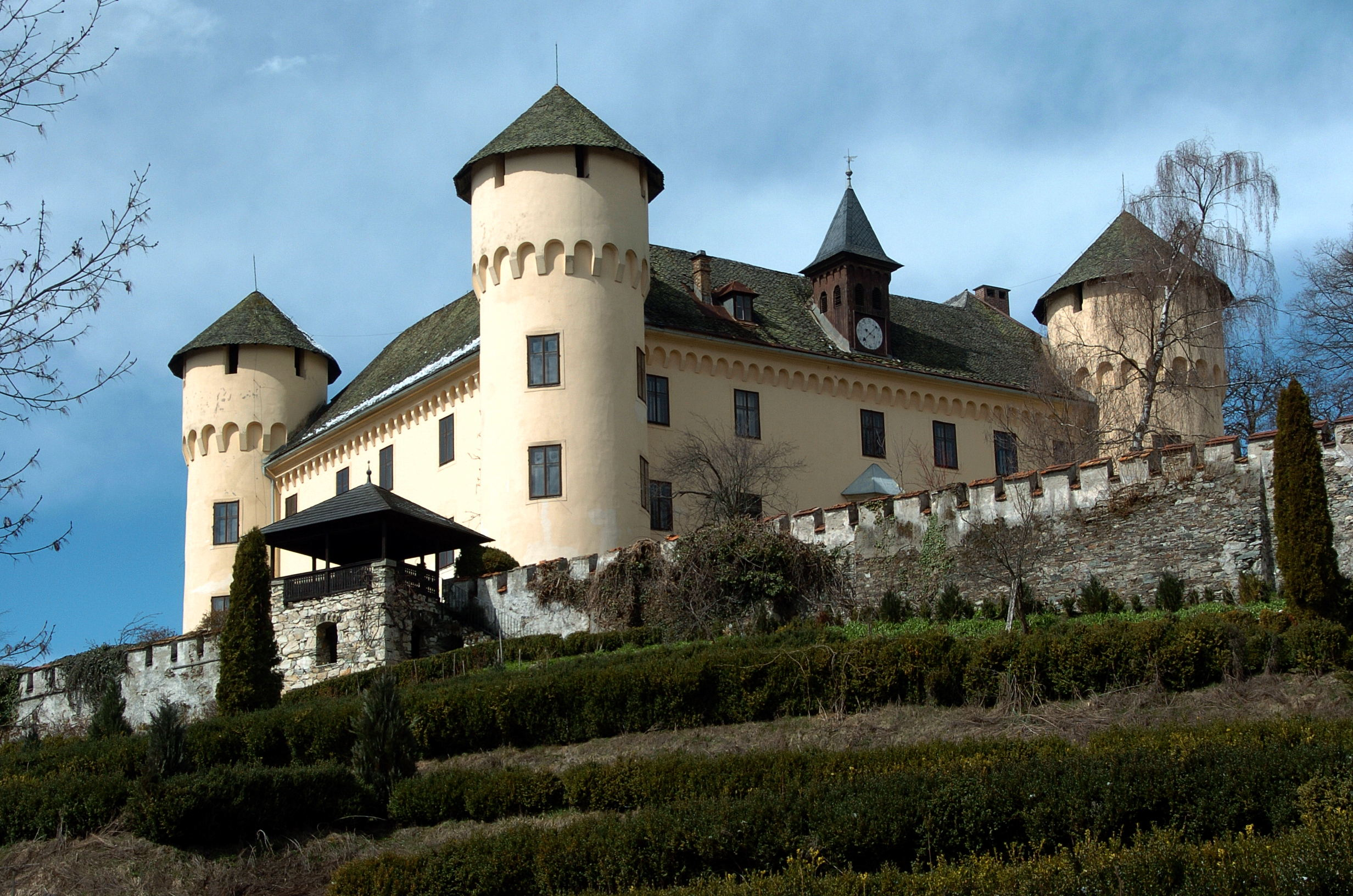
Tentschach Castle

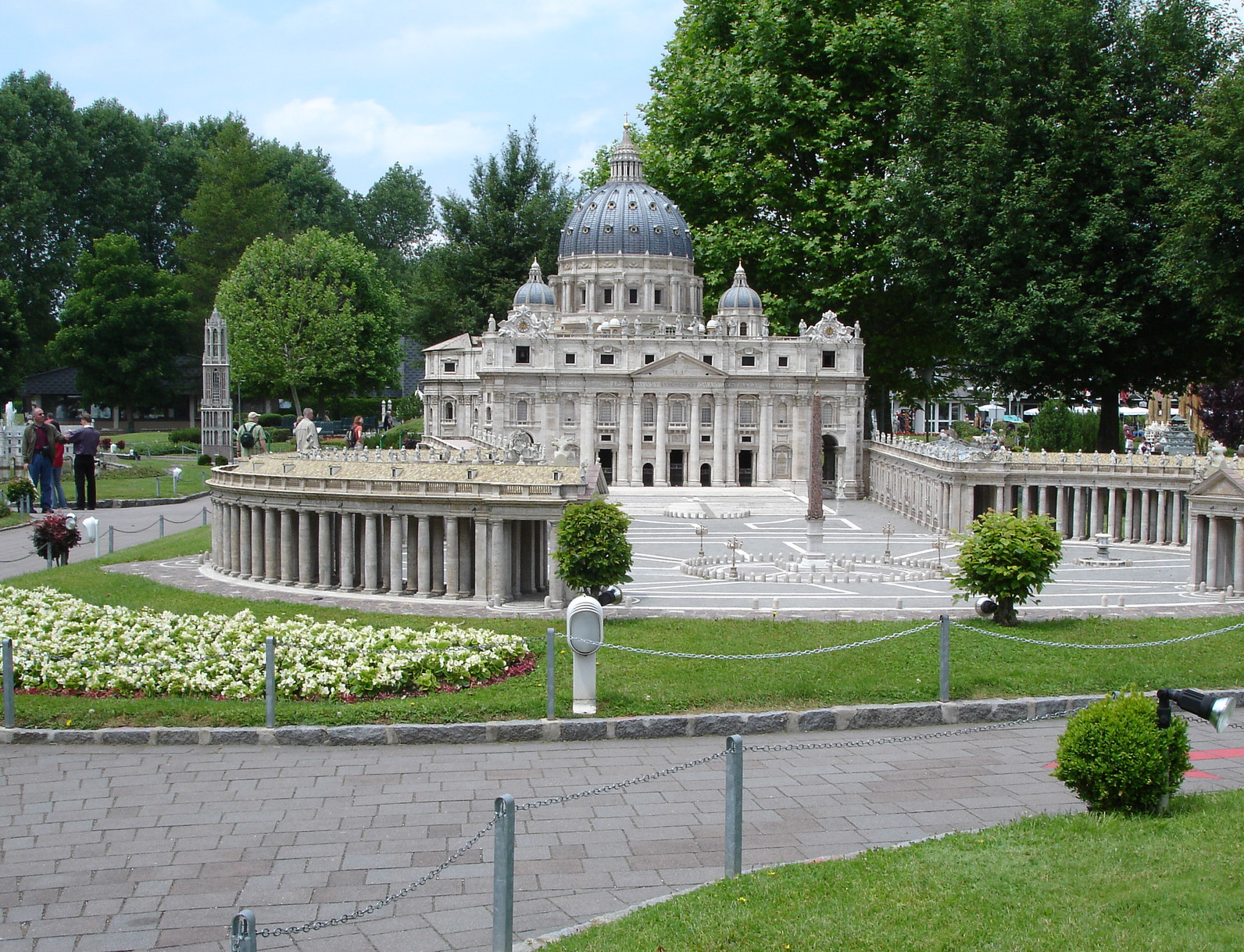
Model of St. Peter's, Rome, in Minimundus

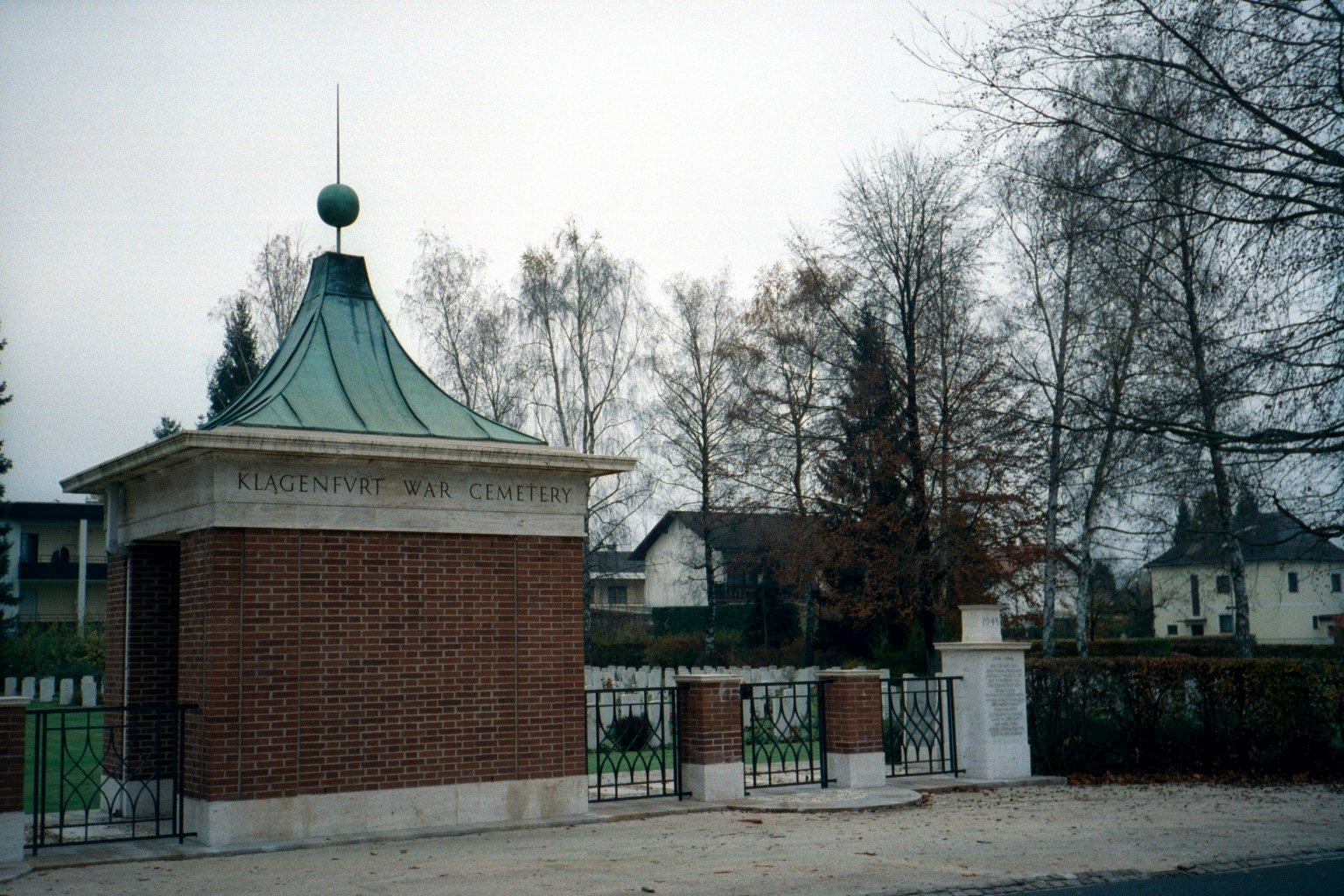
British Forces War Cemetery

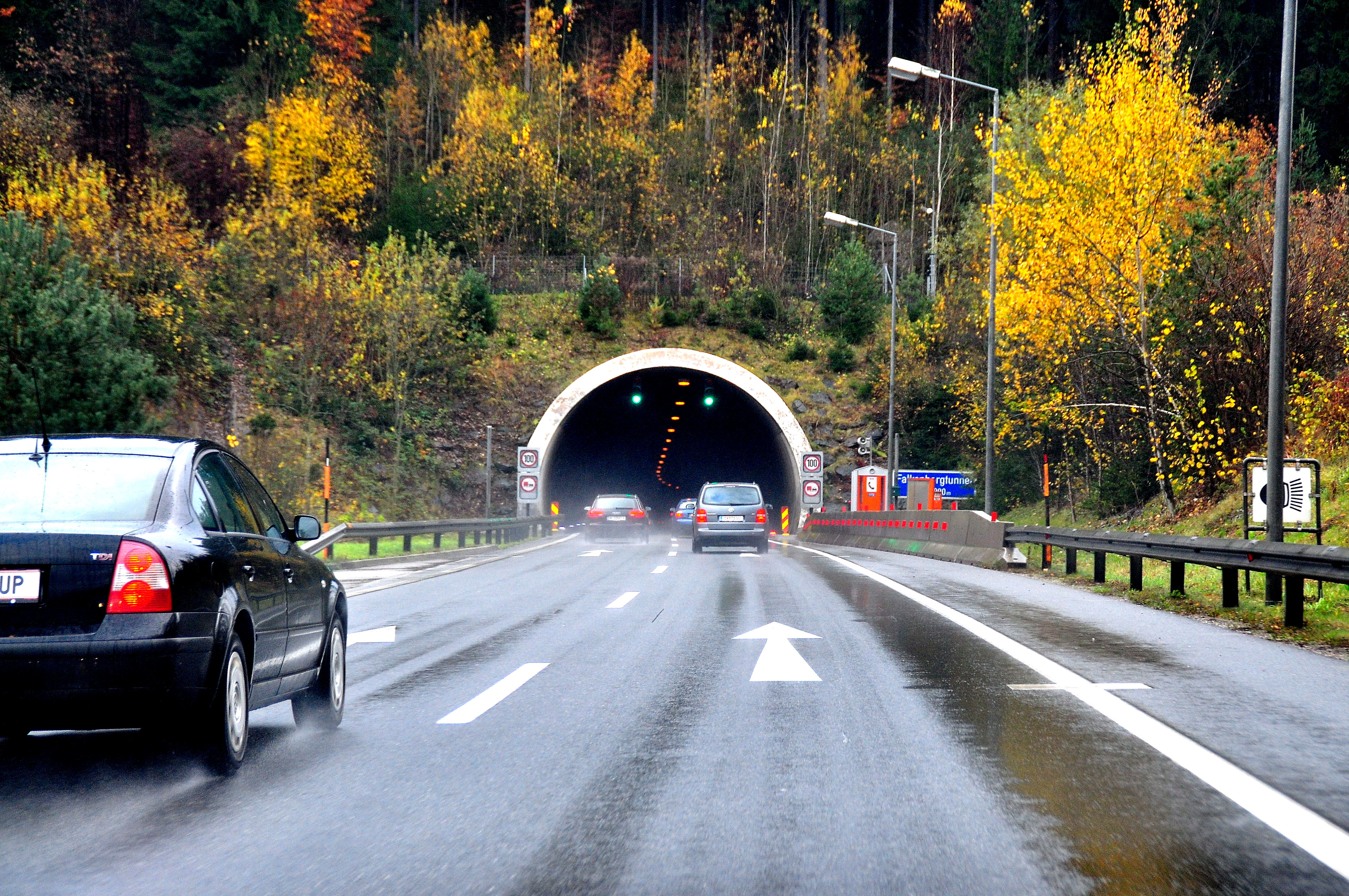
A2 autobahn by-pass at Falkenberg tunnel

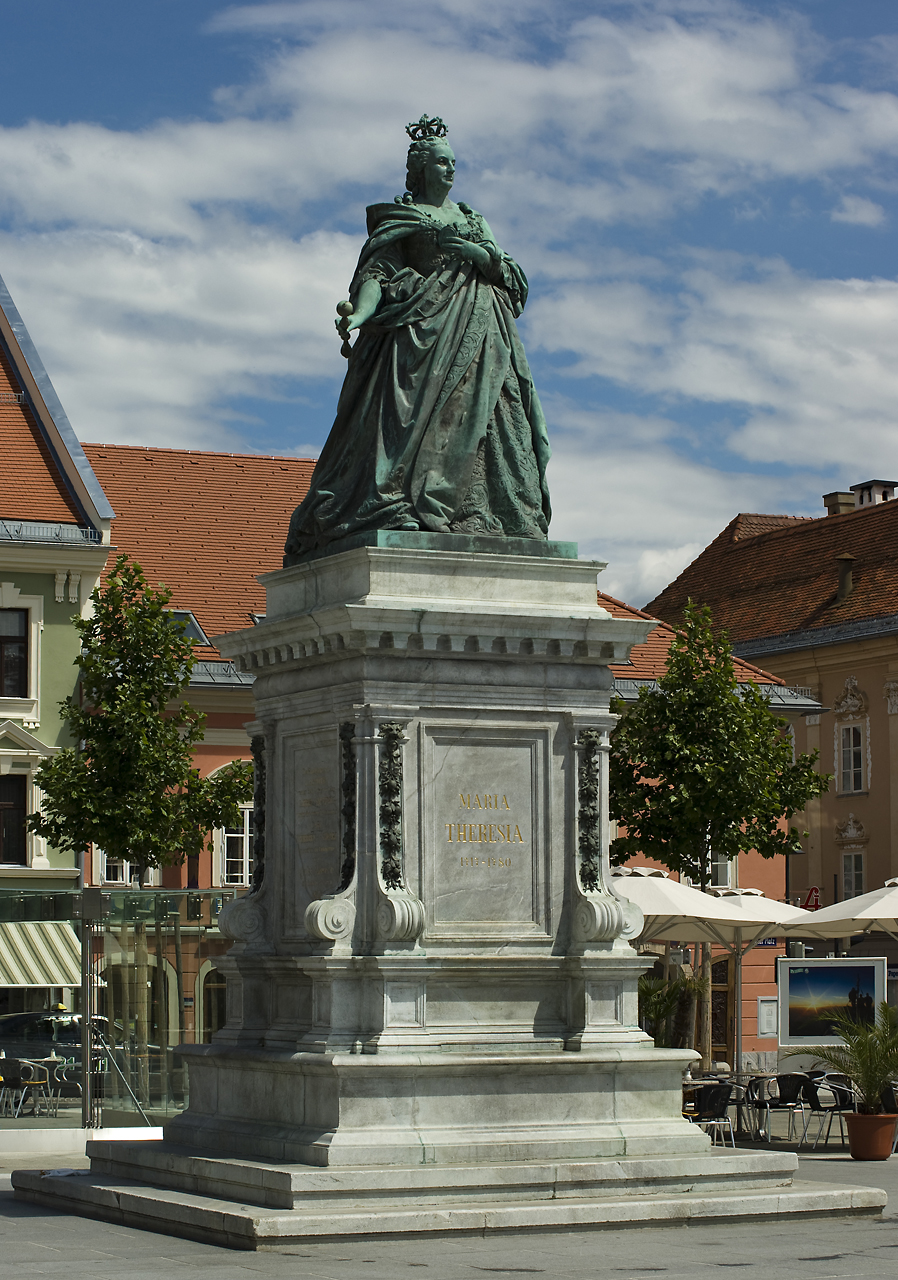
Empress Maria Theresa on Neuer Platz

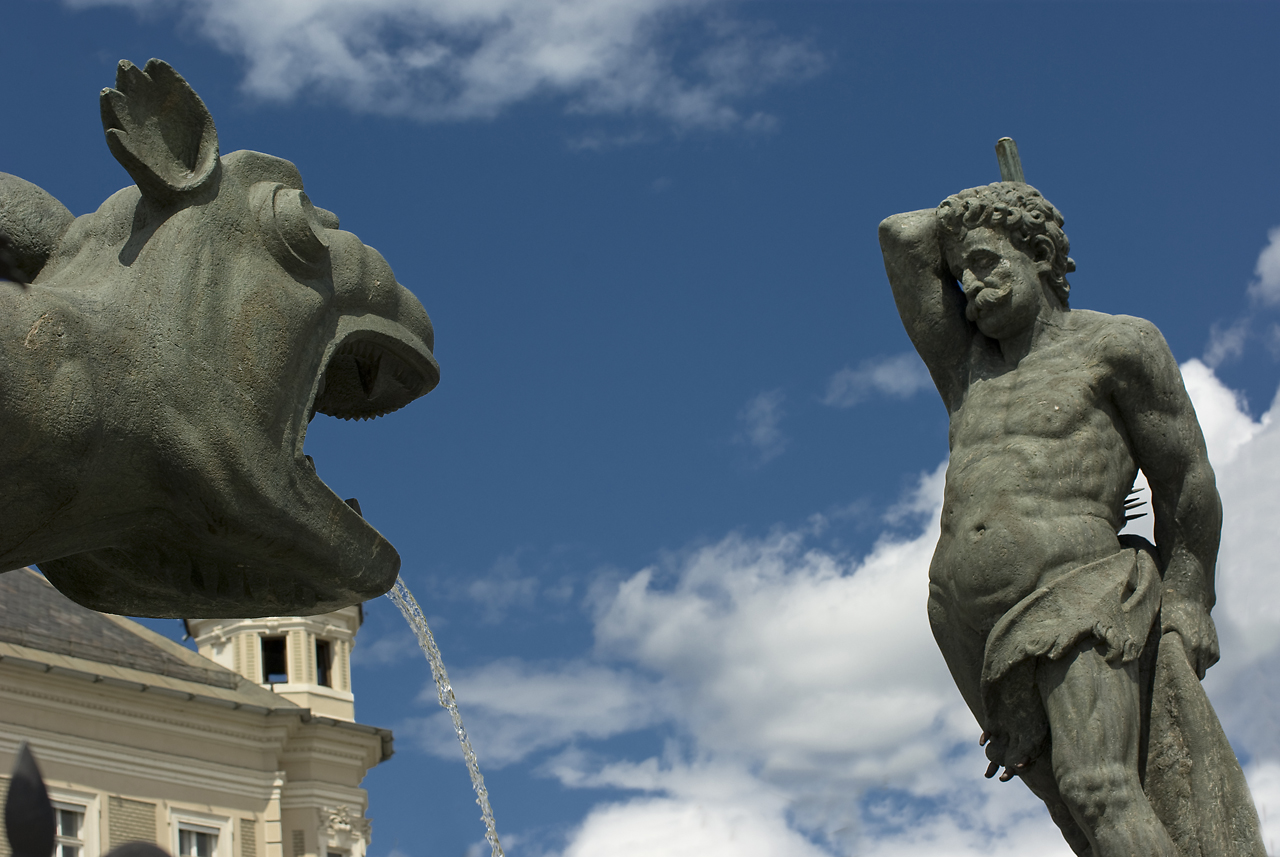
Detail of the Lindworm Fountain

== Twin towns – sister cities ==
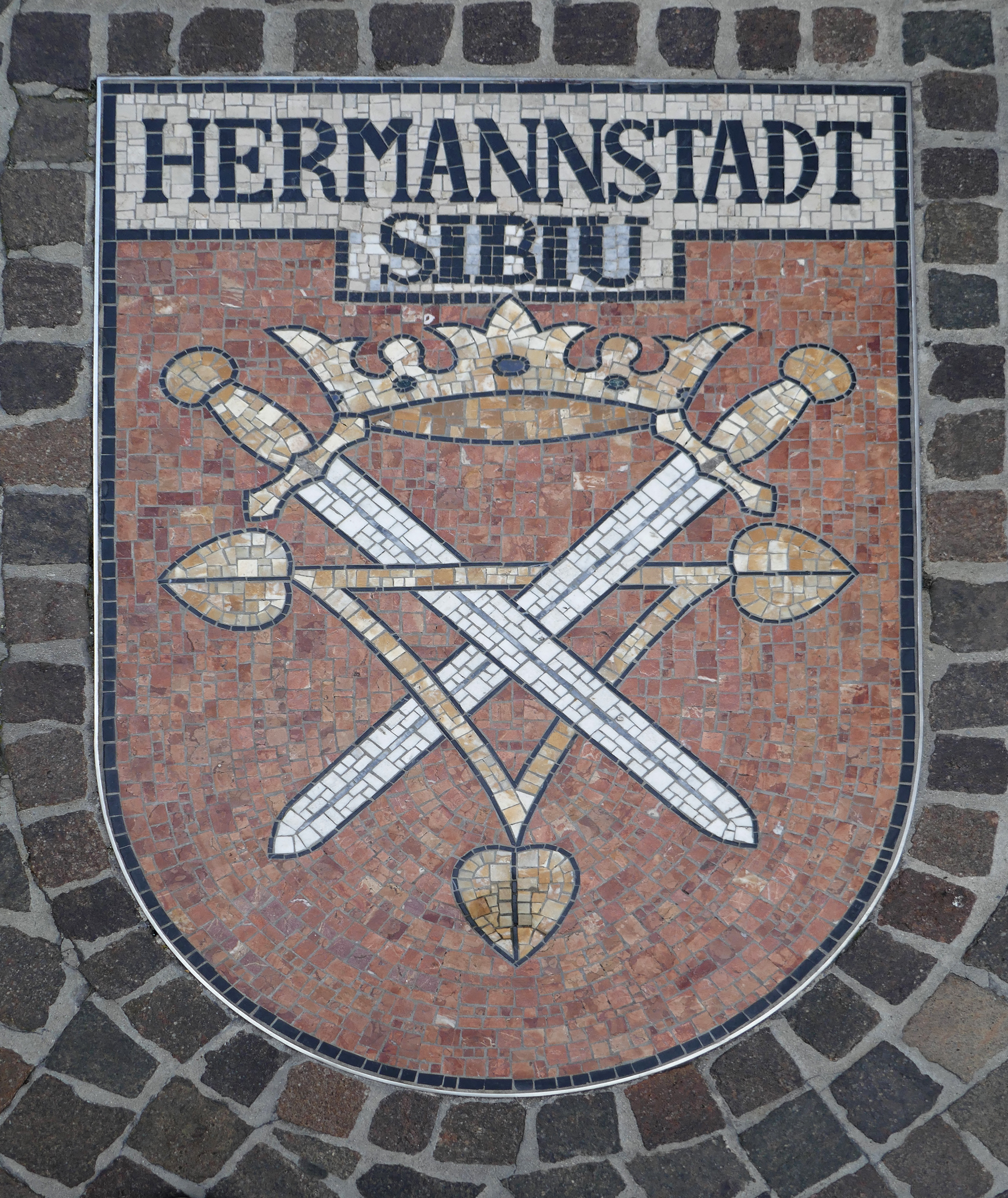
Mosaic dedicated to Sibiu

Klagenfurt is twinned with the following towns and cities.

- Wiesbaden, Hesse, Germany, since 1930
- Venlo, Limburg, Netherlands, since 1961
- Nova Gorica, Slovenia, since 1965
- Gorizia, Gorizia, Friuli-Venezia Giulia, Italy, since 1965
- Gladsaxe, Denmark, since 1969
- Dessau-Roßlau, Saxony-Anhalt, Germany, since 1970
- Dushanbe, Tajikistan, since 1973
- Dachau, Bavaria, Germany, since 1974
- Rzeszów, Podkarpackie Voivodeship, Poland, since 1975
- Sibiu, Romania, since 1990
- Zalaegerszeg, Hungary, since 1990
- Chernivtsi, Ukraine, since 1992
- Nof Hagalil, Israel, since 1993
- Tarragona, Tarragona, Catalonia, Spain, since 1994
- Nanning, China, since 2001
- Laval, Québec, Canada, since 2005
- Lignano Sabbiadoro, Udine, Friuli-Venezia Giulia, Italy, since 2021
- Koper, Slovenia, since 2022
