= Gustav Gugitz =

Austrian architect

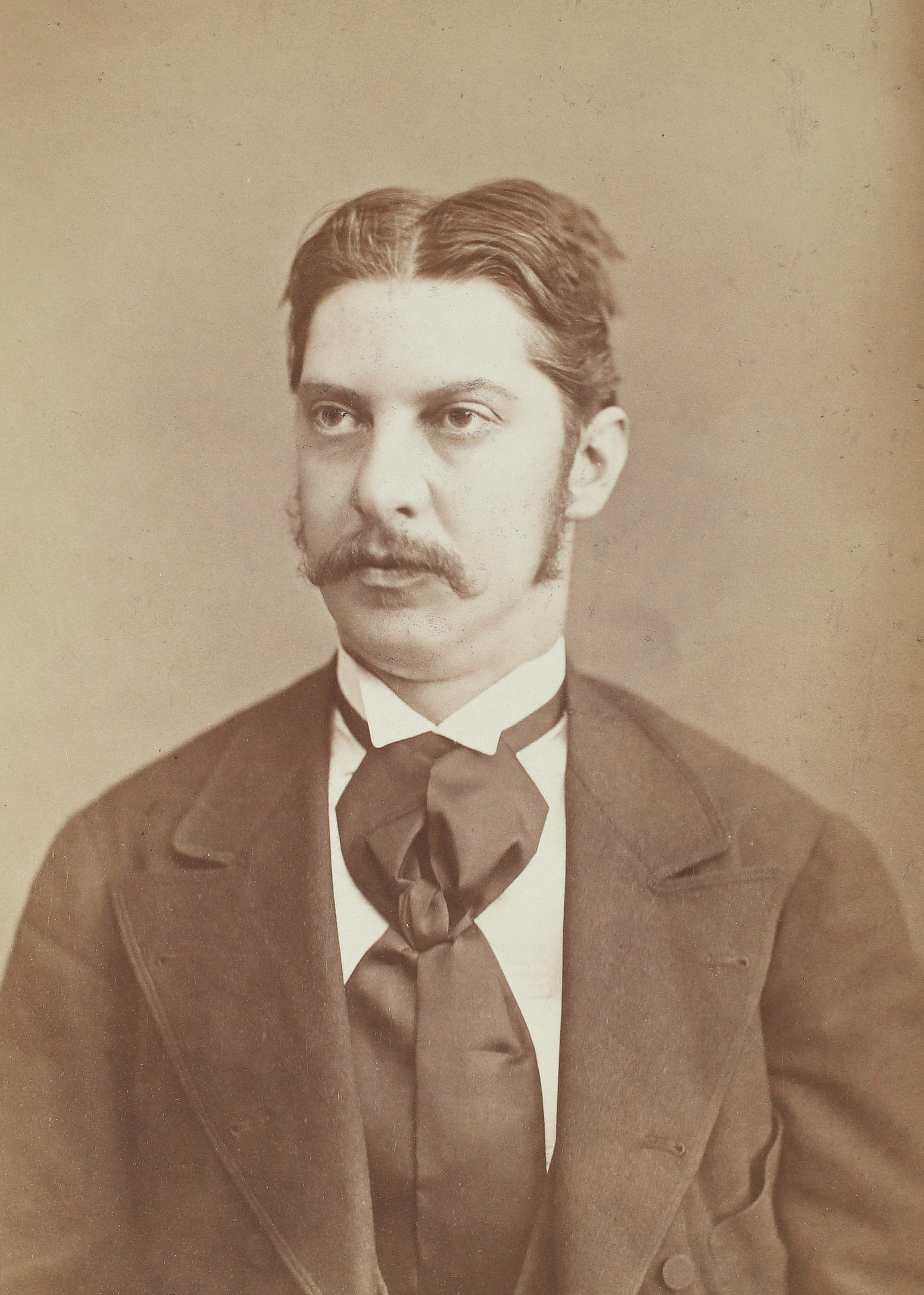
The Austrian architect Gustav Gugitz (1836–1882)

Gustav Adolf Franz Xavier Gugitz (10 May 1836 in Klagenfurt – 17 July 1882 in Vienna) was an Austrian architect.

== Life ==
Gugitz was the youngest of four siblings. He was the son of the businessman Josef Anton Gugitz (1798–12 September 1872) and Maria Elisabeth Decrignis (1803–20 June 1874). In 1852, he had completed his schooling and moved to Vienna to attend the Vienna Polytechnic Institute, studying there for five years; in 1857, he worked under Josef Andreas Kranner, working on the Votive Church.

In 1858, he attempted to become self-employed, but his business failed and in 1858 he enrolled at the Academy of Fine Arts, Vienna to study architecture. His teachers there were August Sicardsburg and Eduard van der Nüll. He stayed at the Academy until 1861. In 1859, he served as apprentice to Peter Gerl, and also provided contributions to Josef Hlávka for the Residence of Bukovinian and Dalmatian Metropolitans. He also attended the lectures of Rudolf Eitelberger at the University of Vienna and travelled to Italy, France, Switzerland and Germany. He also joined a photographic club, and particularly studied Renaissance artwork, going so far as to join an Albrecht Dürer society and take part in costume festivals.

He received the Rosenbaum Award in 1860. Noted as a gifted student by his teachers, he was given various work by their studio. Initially, he performed structural design work for the Vienna Court Opera, later working on projects including Philipp Haas's department store in Vienna and the Palais Larisch. After the death of his teachers in 1868, Gugitz was put in charge of the opera house project, with artistic advice from Josef Storck and Hlávka acting as executive architect. The project was a success, opening on 25 May 1869, and he received the Knight's Cross of the Order of Franz Joseph in 1869. He also received a special award from the Ministry of the Interior on 12 November 1871.

Gugitz then opened his own studio in 1869. Philipp Haas made many orders, including another department store in Milan. He travelled to Istanbul to do surveys for a new palace for the Sultan, but the Ottoman state was unable to finance the project. In this period, he also designed many houses and villas and other buildings, including a plant for Karl Adalbert Lanna in Gmunden. In many of these projects, he was assisted by Storck. Among the junior architects in the studio was Wilhelm Heß.

In 1872, he began preparing for the 1873 World Exhibition in Vienna, under the direction of Carl Hasenauer, which was held in 1873. The Imperial Pavilion was almost entirely Gugitz's work, and for it he received the Order of the Iron Crown (3rd Class). In 1876 he was appointed as Director of the Vienna Civil and Technical Trade School. From this position, he worked to reorganise the system, which became the Vienna Staatgewerbeschule (State Trade School) in 1880. In his birth city of Klagenfurt, he designed the school and the Landesmuseum Kärnten. He also served as a judge in architecture competitions (including in Carlsbad in 1876 and Reichenberg in 1880).

He married Susanna Martinetti-Isella (1849–1929) in March 1874, who was biologically the daughter of the architect Martin Martinetti but who had been adopted by the painter Pietro Isella and his wife Susanna. The family made their home in Döbling; they had a son who died in infancy, and four daughters.

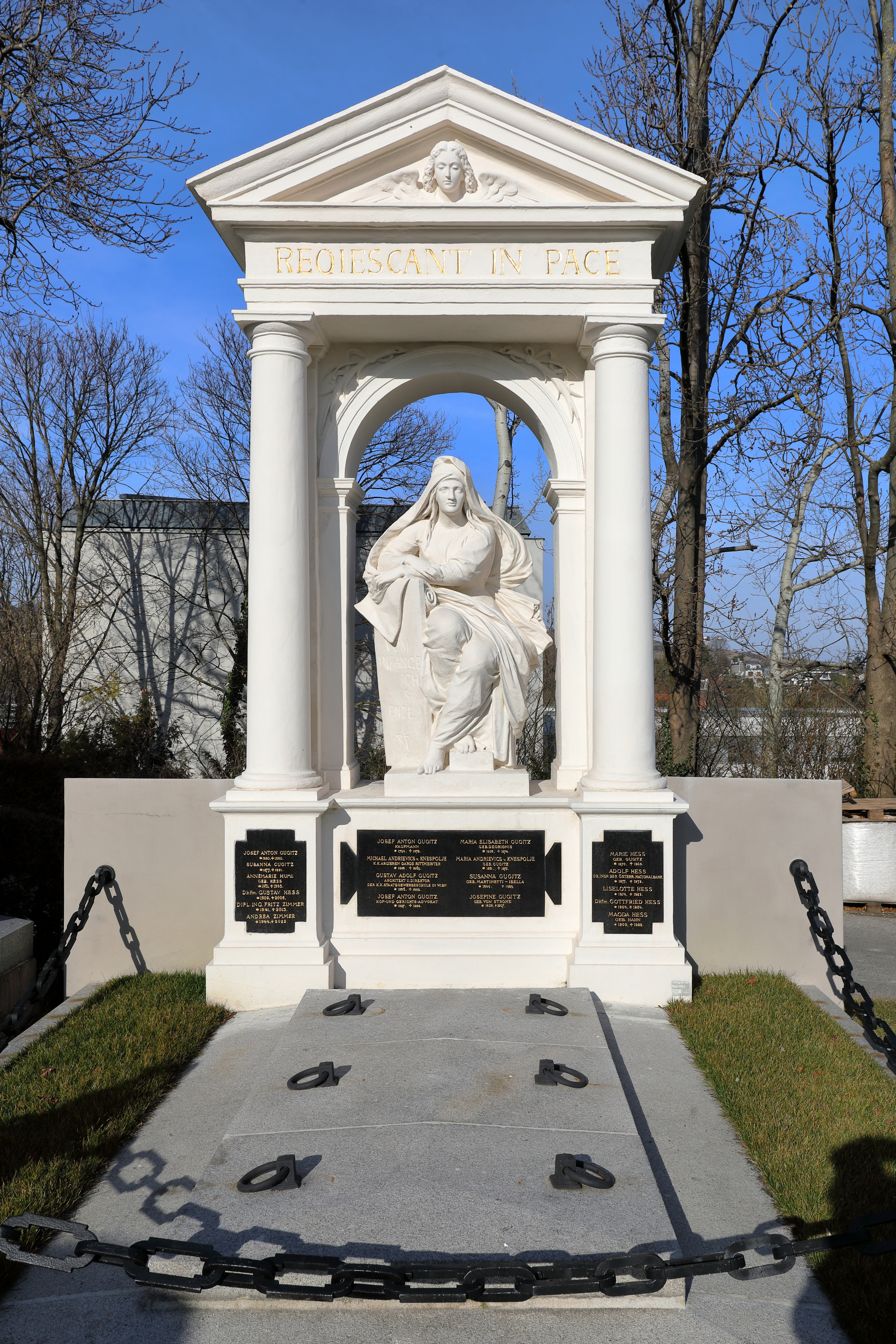
Grave of Gustav Gugitz

After a period of failing health, Gugitz died of heart disease on 17 July 1882, at the age of 46, in his home in Döbling. He was buried in the family vault in Grinzinger Cemetery, in the tomb he had designed in 1875 after his parents' deaths. He was survived by his four daughters. His final work had been the monument to Philipp Haas in the Zentralfriedhof. After his death, Heß completed the construction of the Landesmuseum Kärnten, begun in 1879, in 1884.
