= Hasenauer =

Hasenauer is a German language habitational surname for someone from Hasenau in Silesia (abandoned locality in Dolnośląskie). Notable people with the name include:

- Bartholomäus Hasenauer (1892–1980), Austrian politician
- Bertram Hasenauer (1970), Austrian painter
- Carolin Hasenauer, German journalist
- Georg Hasenauer (1811–1888), Austrian priest
- Gerald Hasenauer (1970), Austrian visual artist
- Hermann Hasenauer (1886–?), German writer
- Hubert Hasenauer (1962), German forestry scientist
- Johann Georg Hasenauer (1887–1929), Austrian priest
- Jan Hasenauer (1983), German systems biologist
- Karl von Hasenauer (1833–1894), Austrian architect
- Richard Erwin Hasenauer, American mathematician
- Stefan Hasenauer, Austrian researcher
- Ute Hasenauer (1966), German violinist
