= Hans Hollein =

Austrian architect and designer (1934–2014)

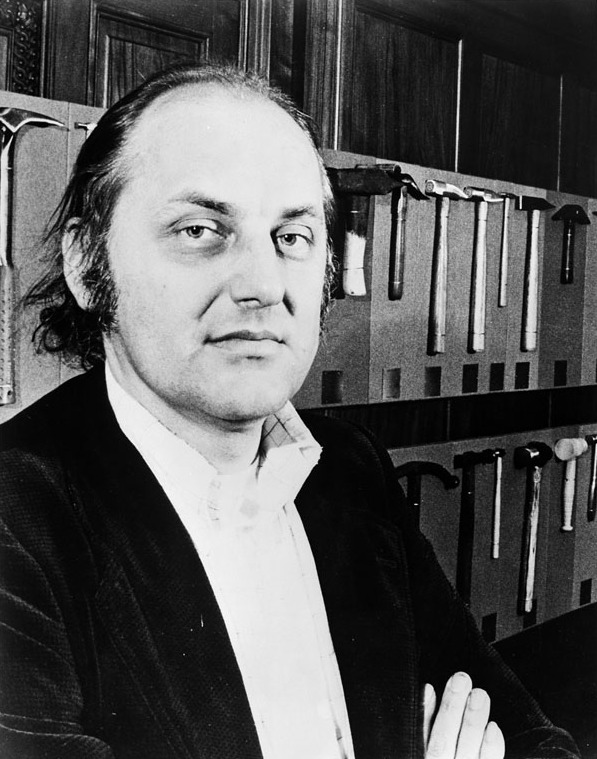
- Hollein in 1976
- Born: 30 March 1934; Vienna, Austria
- Died: 24 April 2014 (aged 80); Vienna, Austria
- Education: Academy of Fine Arts Vienna
- Occupation: Architect

Hans Hollein (30 March 1934 – 24 April 2014) was an Austrian architect and designer and key figure of postmodern architecture. Some of his most notable works are the Haas House and the Albertina extension in the inner city of Vienna.

== Biography ==
Hollein was born in Vienna, and graduated in 1956 from the Academy of Fine Arts Vienna, where he studied in the master class of Clemens Holzmeister. During 1959 he attended the Illinois Institute of Technology and then in 1960, the University of California, Berkeley, where he completed his Master of Architecture degree. During these years he met Mies van der Rohe, Frank Lloyd Wright and Richard Neutra. In 1963 he exhibited, Architecture, along with Walter Pichler at Galerie nächst St. Stephan in St Stephen Vienna, highlighting their ideas for utopian architecture. Afterwards, he worked for various architectural firms in Sweden and the United States before returning to Vienna, founding his own office in 1964.

Hollein's early works were small scale designs, such as the Retti candle shop in Vienna, which notably featured a facade constructed of anodized aluminum.

In 1972, Hollein designed a series of glasses for the American Optical Corps.

Hollein was a guest professor at Washington University in St. Louis on two separate occasions, the first being 1963–64 and the second in 1966. During this period he was also a visiting professor at the Yale School of Architecture. He was a professor at the Kunstakademie Düsseldorf between 1967 and 1976, after which he became a professor at the University of Applied Arts Vienna.

Hollein worked mainly as an architect but also established himself as a designer through his work for the Memphis Group and the Alessi Company. Additionally, he contributed to various exhibitions, including an architectural facade for the Strada Novissima in The Presence of the Past exhibition at the 1980 Venice Biennale. In 1980 he designed the stage for a production of Arthur Schnitzler's drama Komödie der Verführung (Comedy of Seduction) at Vienna's Burgtheater. In 1985 Hollein was awarded the Pritzker Prize.

Hollein achieved international fame with his winning competition designs for the Abteiberg Museum in Mönchengladbach (1972–82) and an underground Guggenheim Museum branch in Salzburg (1989). The later hasn't been built, but his ideas for an underground museum still materialised in the Vulcania European Centre of Vulcanology in Auvergne in France (1997–2002).

Starting from the late 1990s, Hollein designed large-scale projects, including bank headquarters in Lichtenstein, Spain and Peru. Starting from 2010 he worked with Ulf Kotz and Christoph Monschein at the Hans Hollein & Partner ZT GmbH.

Hollein died on 24 April 2014 in Vienna, after a long illness, at the age of 80.

His son Max Hollein is the Director of the Metropolitan Museum of Art in New York City. Previously he was Director and CEO of the Fine Arts Museums of San Francisco, the umbrella organization of the de Young Museum and Legion of Honor Museum. He is the former Director of the Städel Museum, the Liebieghaus and the Schirn Kunsthalle in Frankfurt am Main, Germany.

== Main works ==
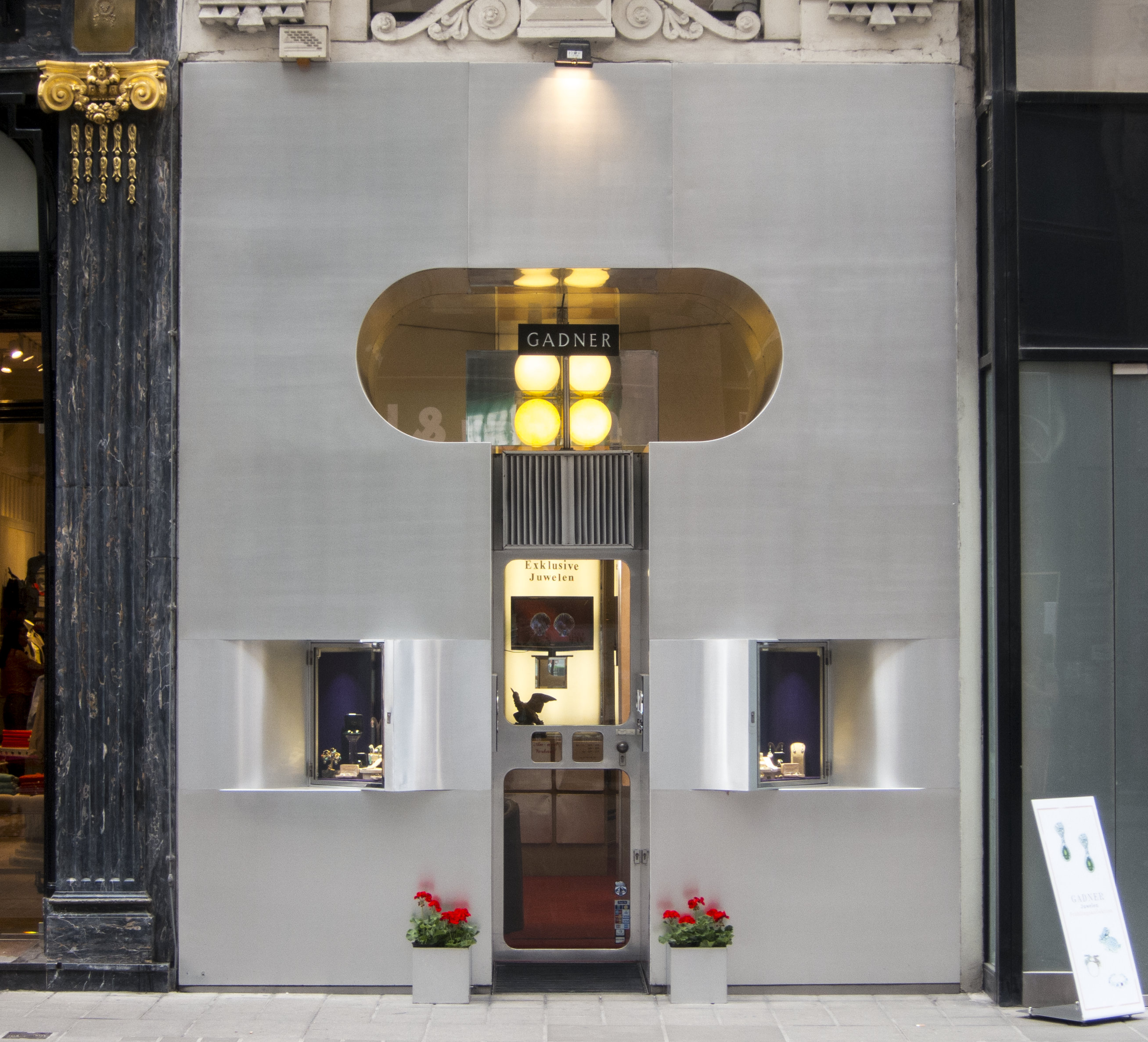
Retti candle shop, Vienna, 1964–65

- 1964–65: Retti candle shop, Vienna, Austria
- 1967–69: Feigen Gallery, New York, USA
- 1972–74: Schullin Jewellery shop, Vienna
- 1972–82: Abteiberg Museum Mönchengladbach
- 1977–78: Glass and Ceramics house, Teheran, Iran
- 1979–90: Ganztagsschule, Vienna
- 1983–85: Rauchstrasse apartments in Berlin, part of the International Building Exhibition
- 1985–90: Haas-Haus in Vienna, Austria
- 1987–91: Museum für Moderne Kunst in Frankfurt am Main, Germany
- 1989: Guggenheim ('Museum im Mönchsberg'), Salzburg, Austria (unbuilt)
- 1992–2002: Niederösterreichisches Landesmuseum, St. Pölten, Austria
- 1994–2000: Generali Media Tower Donaukanal, Vienna, Austria
- 1996–2001: Austrian Embassy in Berlin, Germany
- 1996–2000: Interbank Headquarters, Lima, Peru
- 1997–2002: Centrum Bank in Vaduz, Liechtenstein, in collaboration with Bargetze+Partner
- 1997–2002: Vulcania – European Centre of Vulcanology in Auvergne, France
- 2001–03: Albertina Museum extension, Vienna, Austria
- 2004–08: Hilton hotel, Vienna, Austria
- 2004–07: Sea Mio, Apartment-Towers, Taipei, Taiwan
- 2006–11: Pezet 515, Lima, Peru
- 2011–2013: Kaohsiung Apartments | Gate to the Muesum, Kaohsiung, Taiwan
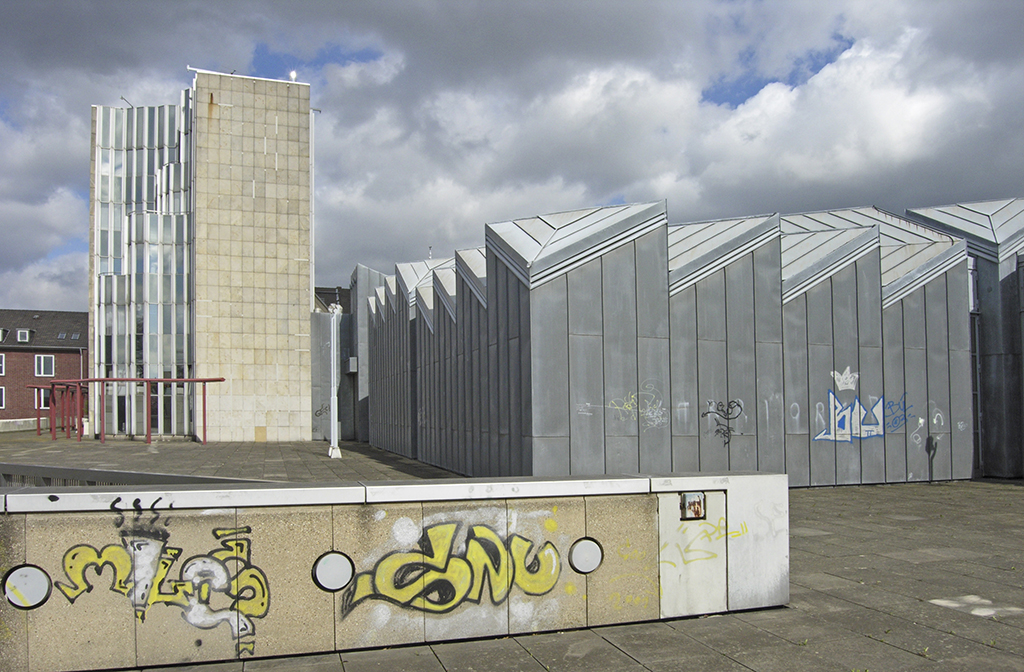
Abteiberg Museum, Mönchengladbach, Germany, 1972–82

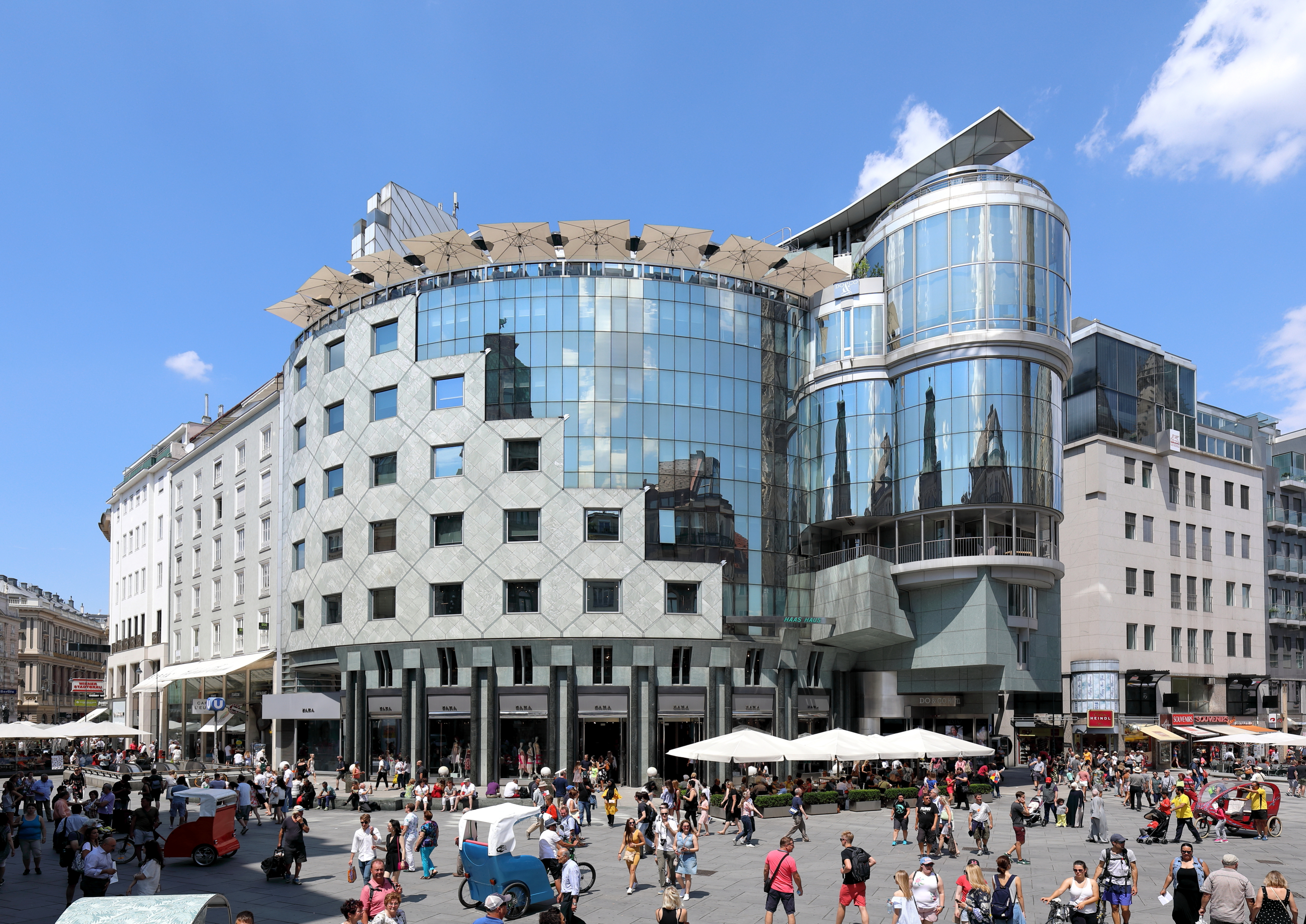
Haas-Haus in Vienna, 1985–90

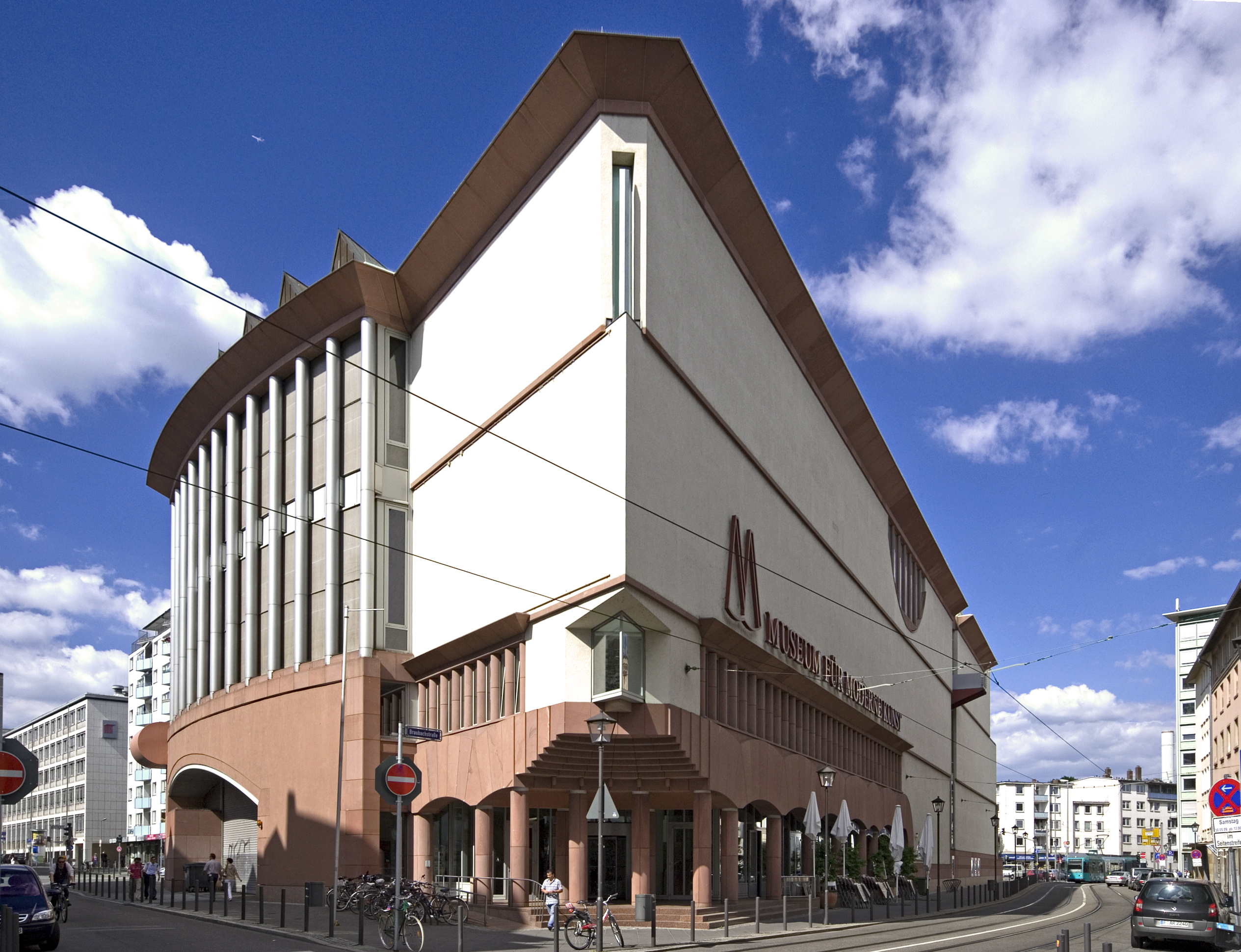
Museum für Moderne Kunst, Frankfurt am Main, 1983–91

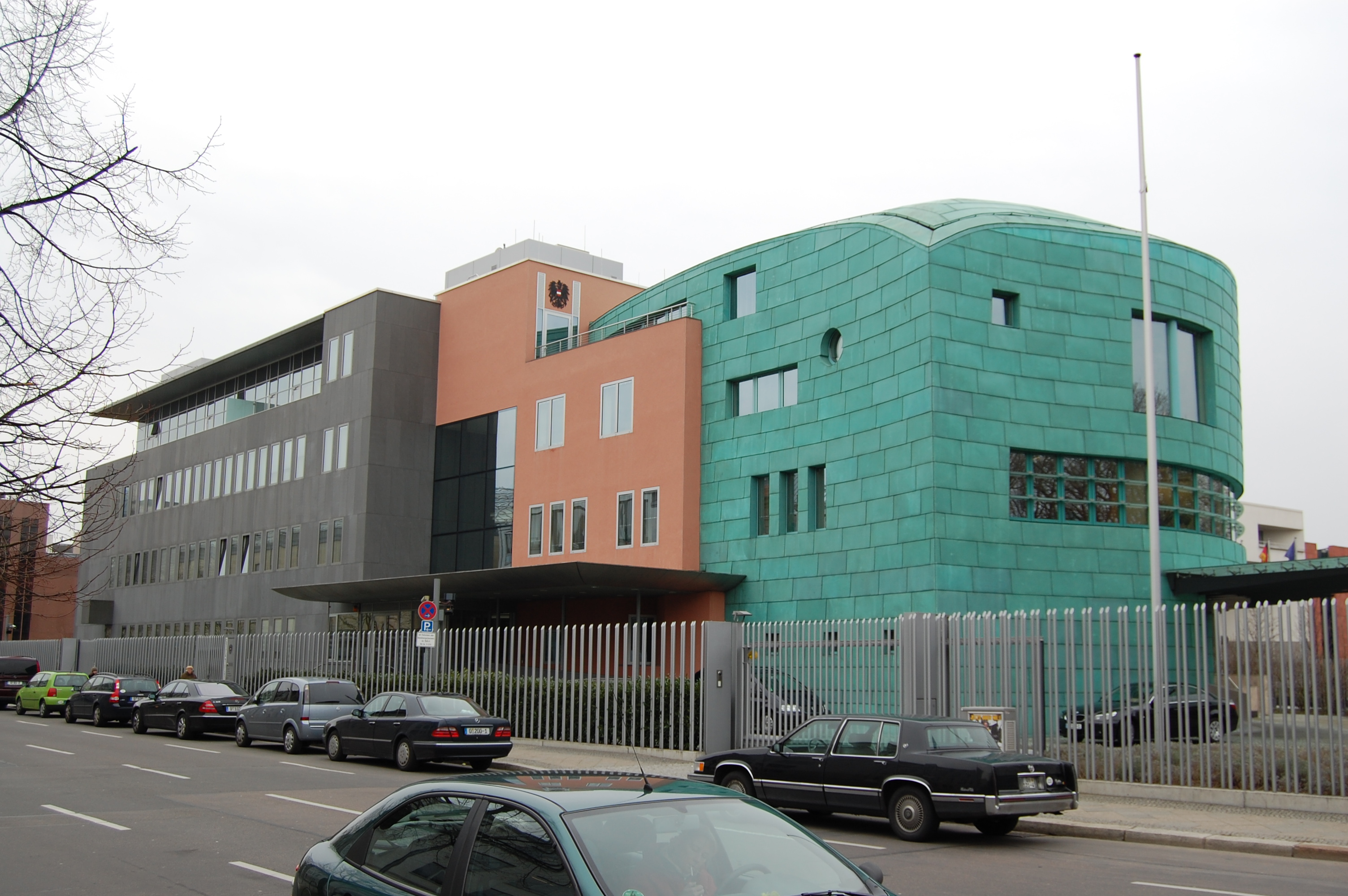
Austrian Embassy in Berlin, 1996-2001

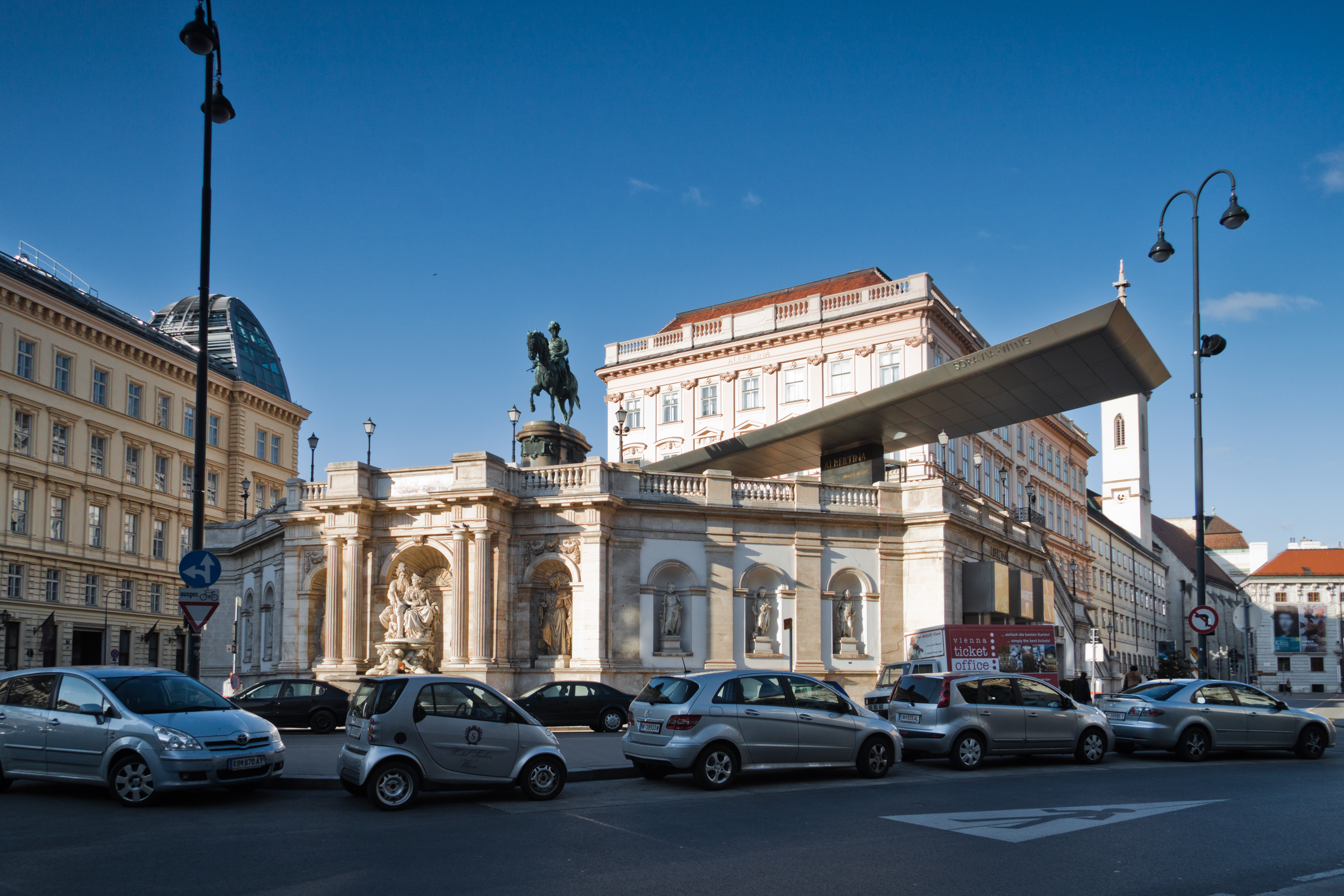
Soravia-Wing of the Albertina, Vienna, 2001–03

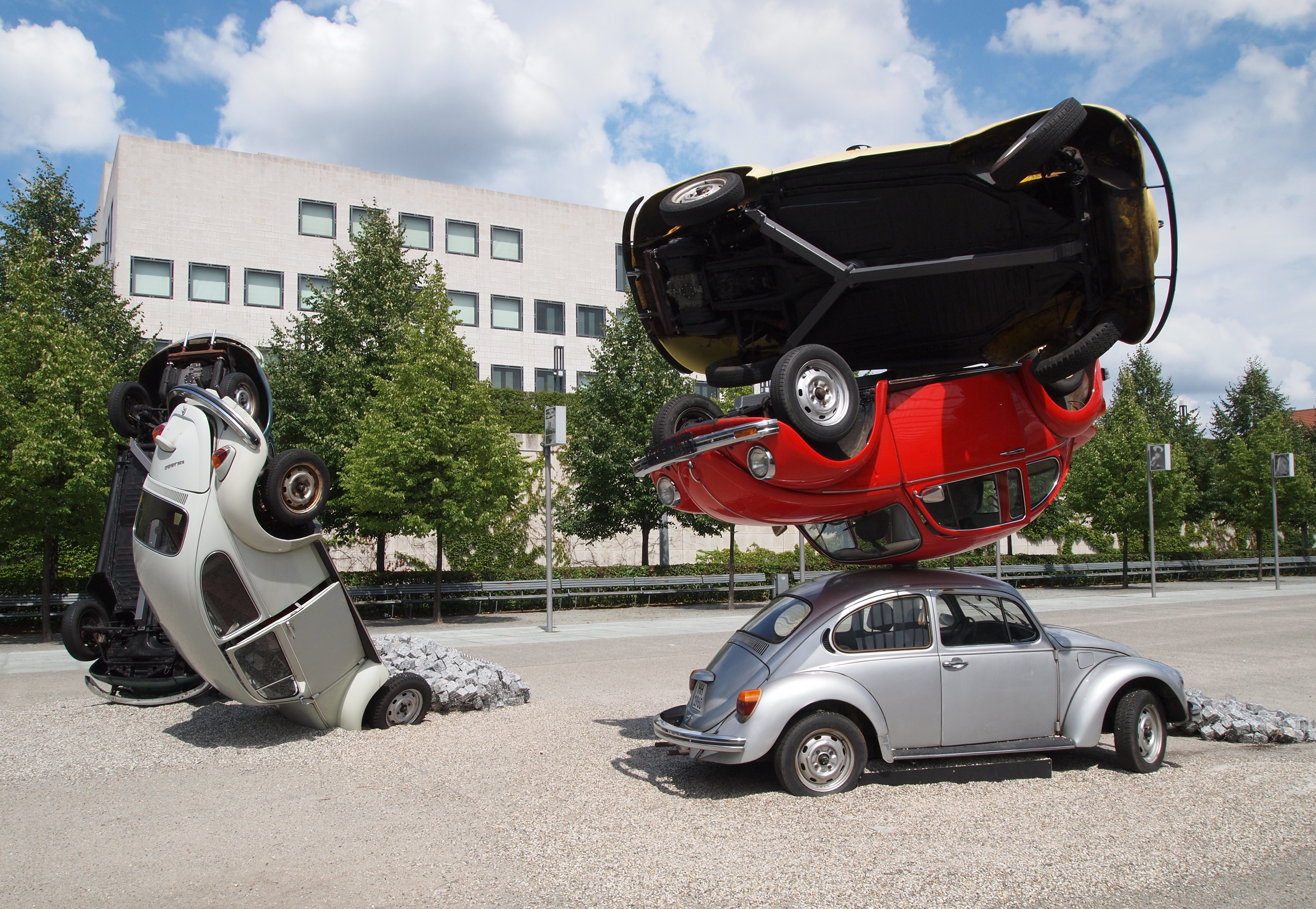
Car Building, Center for Art and Media, Karlsruhe, Germany, 2011

== Prizes ==
- R. S. Reynolds Memorial Award endowed by the American Institute of Architects (1966 and 1984)
- Prize for Architecture of the City of Vienna, (1974)
- Grand Austrian State Prize for Architecture (1983)
- Pritzker Architecture Prize (1985)
- Austrian Decoration for Science and Art (1990)
- Gold Decoration for Services to Vienna (1994)
- Grand Merit Cross of the Order of Merit of the Federal Republic of Germany (1997)
- Officer of the Legion of Honour (France, 2003)
- Honorary Medal of the Austrian capital Vienna in Gold (2004)
- Grand Decoration of Honour in Gold for Services to the Republic of Austria (2009)
- Golden Rathausmann (2009)
