= Architectural design competition =

An architectural competition is a type of design competition, in which an entity that intends to build new work, or is just seeking ideas, invites architects to submit design proposals. The winning proposal is usually chosen by an independent panel of design professionals, stakeholders (such as government and local representatives, the leadership of a cultural institution, etc.) or public opinion. The effect of architectural competitions varies with competition format.

== Public engagement ==
Architectural design competitions are often used to generate new ideas for building and/or landscape design, stimulate public engagement, generate publicity for the project and the commissioning entity, and help emerging designers gain exposure (and potentially win commissions that might be out of reach to them otherwise). Architectural competitions are often, though not exclusively, used to award commissions for public buildings: In some countries, government procurement rules for tendering public building contracts stipulate some form of open architectural competition.

== History ==
Architectural competitions have existed for more than 2,500 years. The design of the Acropolis, in Athens, resulted from an architectural competition in 448 B.C., as did several European cathedrals in the Middle Ages. During the Renaissance, many projects initiated by the papacy or other top religious bodies were decided through design competition. Examples are the Spanish Steps in Rome and, famously, the competition for the dome of the Florence Cathedral, won by Filippo Brunelleschi in 1419. Open competitions emerged in the late 18th century in countries including the United States, Great Britain, Ireland, France, and Sweden.

In 19th century England and Ireland, more than 2,500 competitions were held within five decades, with 362 in London alone. The Royal Institute of British Architects drafted its first set of rules in 1839 and its first formal regulations in 1872. German regulations had been introduced in 1867. In the same period, in the Netherlands, an association for the advancement of architecture (Maatschappij tot Bevordering van de Bouwkunst) started organizing conceptual competitions to stimulate creativity among architects.

Competition for the design of the Peace Palace in The Hague, 1905

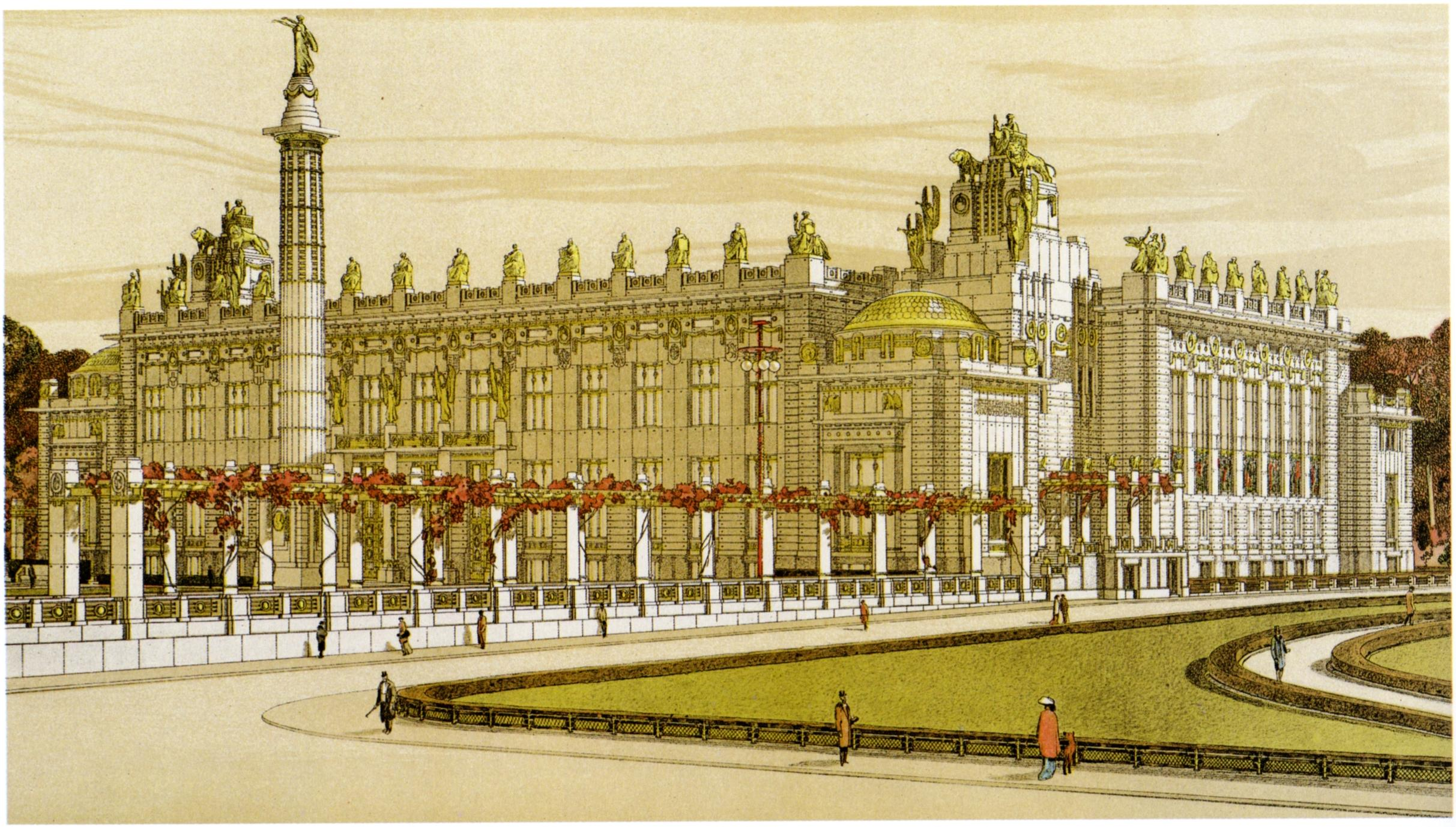
Competition entry by Otto Wagner

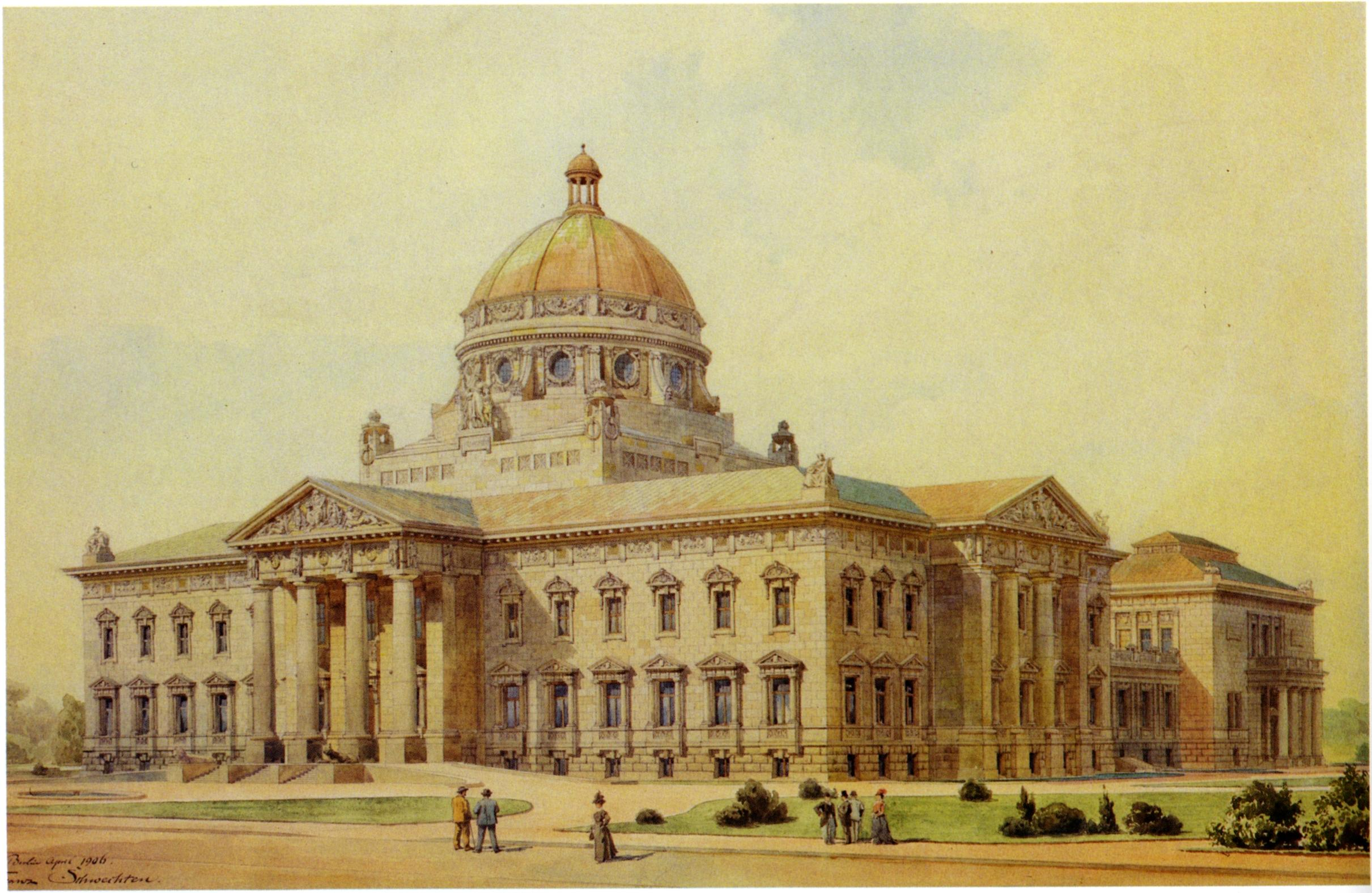
Entry by Franz Heinrich Schwechten

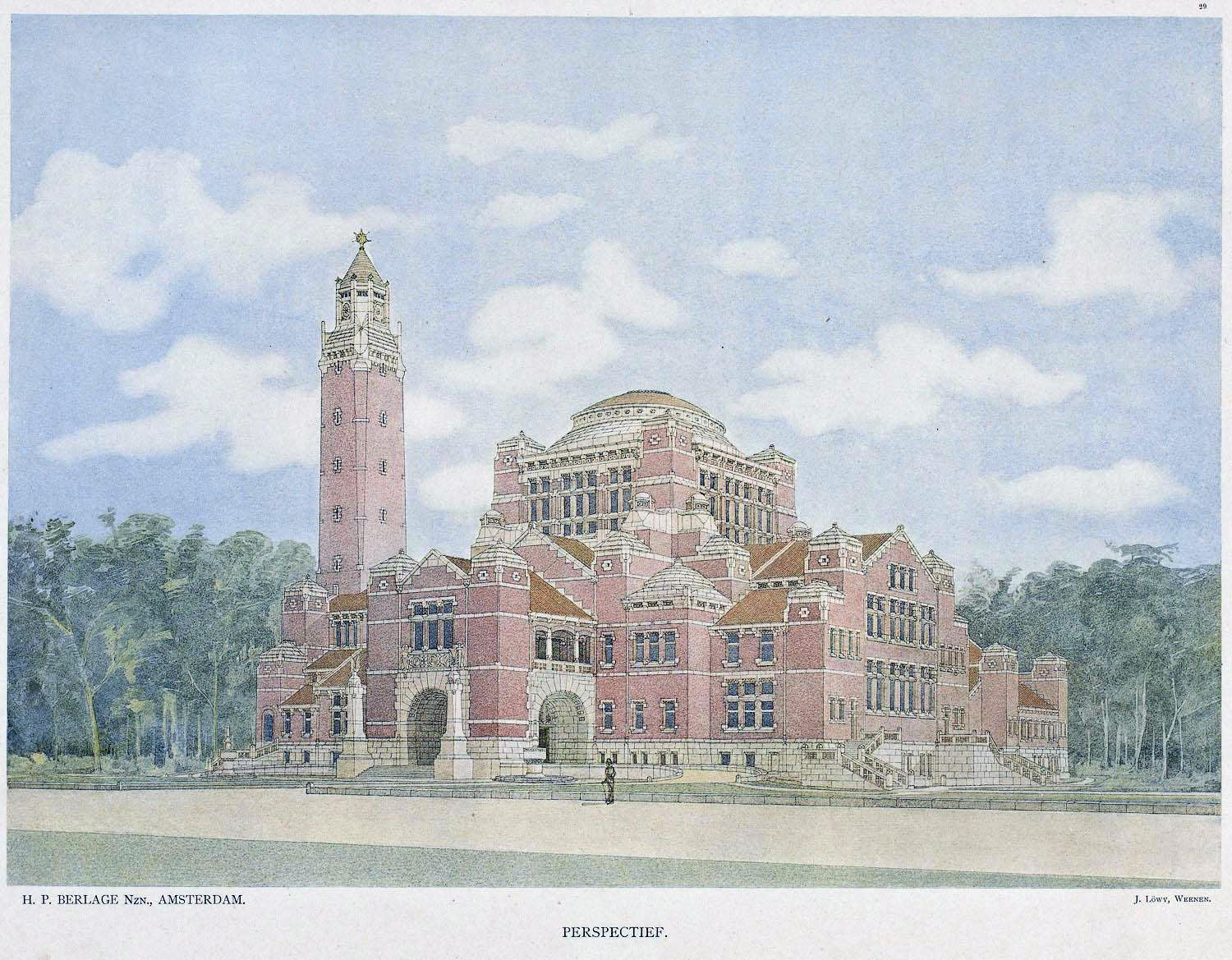
Entry by Hendrik Petrus Berlage

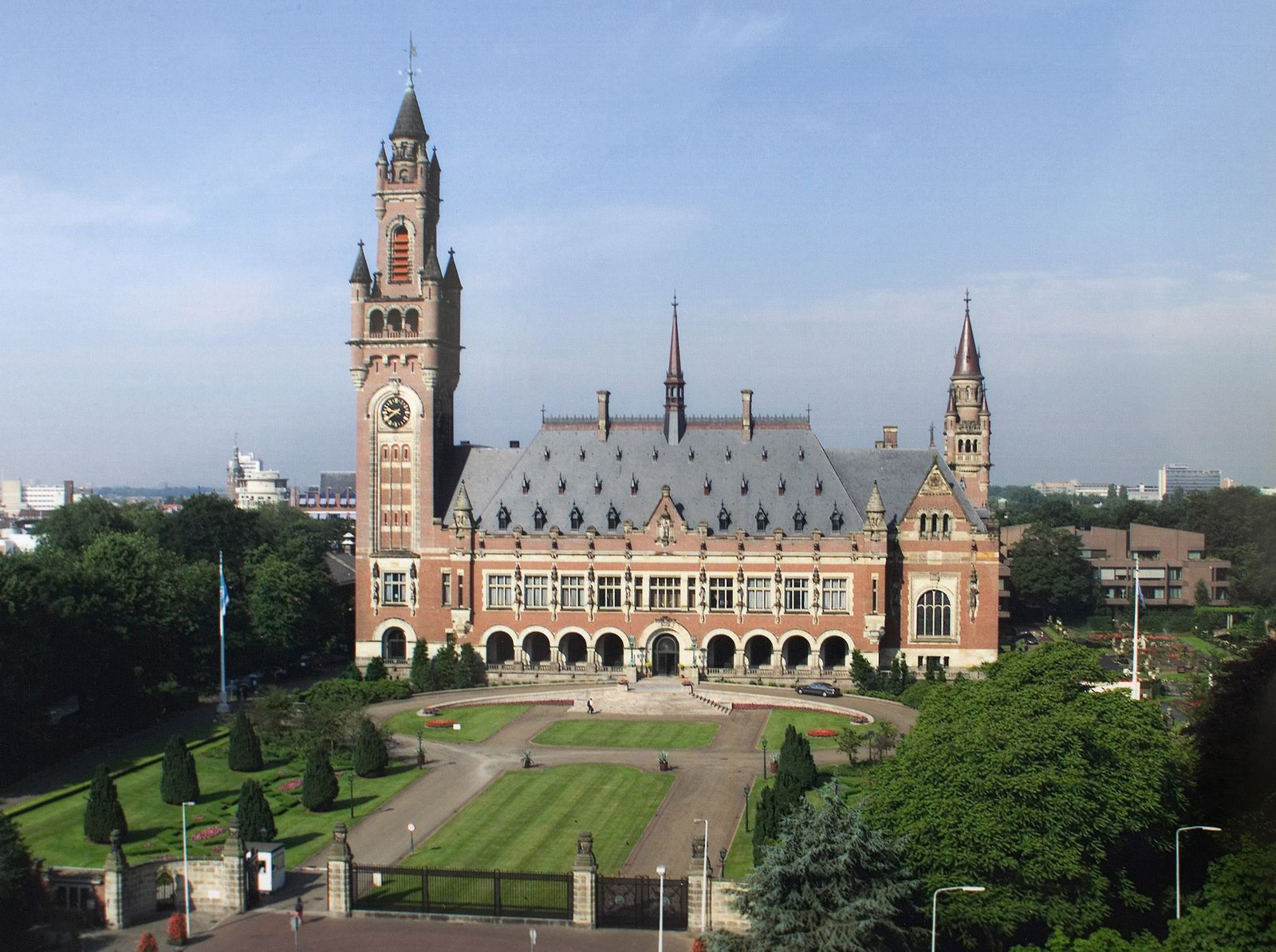
Building by competition winner Louis M. Cordonnier

== Competition types ==
Various competition paradigms exist, most prominently the following types or combinations of them:

Open vs, Invited (or Otherwise Limited) Competitions:

- Open Competitions: international, national, regional, or otherwise defined in scope, they typically have little or no restrictions on who may enter.
- Invited, Limited, Pre-Qualified, or otherwise Non-Open Competitions restrict who may participate (and, in many cases, also provide stipends or honorariums to participants) Project vs. Ideas Competitions:
- Project Competitions: seek schemes for specific building and/ or landscape projects that the commissioning entities intend to realize
- Ideas Competitions: held for the purpose of generating new ideas (in some cases, particularly novel, provocative, or visionary ones) Single- vs. Multi-stage Competitions
- Single-Stage Competitions:
- Multi-Stage Competitions (two stages or more), many of which invite only short-listed participants, a limited group of chosen semi-finalists, to continue to the next stage(s), for which they might receive a stipend or honorarium to help cover costs Anonymous vs. Non-Anonymous Competitions:
- Anonymous Competitions: judged or juried, for greater objectivity, with no knowledge of the names or identities of participating individuals and firms
- Non-Anonymous (or Cooperative) Competitions: Competing architects and firms are openly identified from the start (competitors might even be invited to present their projects in person to the jury to explain design strategies and provide for project-specific dialogue) Recurrent vs. One-Time Competitions:
- Seasonal or Annual Competitions: These recurrent competitions, including Europan, put out periodical calls for entries. They may, or may not, result in an actual constructed project, depending on the set-up.
- One-Time Competitions, held for a specific project
- Student Design Competitions

== Rules and guidelines ==
The rules of each competition are defined by the organizer; they often, however, follow the guidelines provided by the International Union of Architects or the relevant national or regional architectural organization. Competition guidelines define roles, responsibilities, processes, and procedures within a competition and provide guidance on possible competition types, eligibility criteria, jury composition, participation conditions, payments, prizes, publication of results, and other aspects.

In France and Germany, design competitions are compulsory for all public buildings exceeding a certain cost.

Winning first prize in a competition does not guarantee that the project will be realized. The commissioning body often has the right to veto the winning design, and both requirements and finances may change, thwarting the original intention. (Many competitions have been held and won before the financing was even in place.) The 2002 World Trade Center site design competition is an example of a highly publicized competition, in which only the basic elements of the winning design by Daniel Libeskind appeared in the finished project.

== Major international architectural design competitions ==
Most significant among architectural competitions are the ones which are internationally open, attract a large number of design submissions, and the winning design is built.

Competition Name	Location	Year	Winner(s)	Design entries
Grand Egyptian Museum	(Egypt) Giza	2002	Heneghan Peng Architects	1,557
White House	(United States) Washington D.C.	1792	James Hoban	9
Walhalla memorial	(Germany) Donaustauf	1816	Leo von Klenze	
Houses of Parliament	(United Kingdom) London	1835	Charles Barry	98
Vienna Ring Road	(Austria) Vienna	1858	Ludwig Förster - Friedrich August von Stache - Eduard van der Nüll and August Sicard von Sicardsburg	85
Hofoper	(Austria) Vienna	1860	Eduard van der Nüll and August Sicard von Sicardsburg	
Paris Opera	(France) Paris	1860	Charles Garnier	171
Rijksmuseum	(Netherlands) Amsterdam	1863	P.J.H. Cuypers	
Law Courts	(England) London	1866	George Edmund Street	11
Reichstag	(Germany) Berlin	1872	Paul Wallot	
Beurs	(Netherlands) Amsterdam	1884	Hendrik Petrus Berlage	
World Exhibition tower	(France) Paris	1889	Gustave Eiffel	
Austrian Postal Savings Bank	(Austria) Vienna	1903	Otto Wagner	
Stockholm City Hall	(Sweden) Stockholm	1903	Ragnar Östberg	
Helsinki Central railway station	(Finland) Helsinki	1903	Eliel Saarinen	21
Peace Palace	(Netherlands) The Hague	1905	Louis Marie Cordonnier and J.A.G. van der Steur	
Tribune Tower	(United States) Chicago	1922	John Mead Howells and Raymond Hood	260
League of Nations Building	(Switzerland) Geneva	1926	Henri Paul Nénot & Julien Flegenheimer; Carlo Broggi; Camille Lefèvre; Giuseppe Vago	377
Lenin Library	(Russia) Moscow	1928	Vladimir Shchuko	
ANZAC War Memorial	(Australia) Sydney	1929	Charles Bruce Dellit	117
Termini Station	(Italy) Rome	1947	Leo Calini, Eugenio Montuori, Massimo Castellazzi, Vasco Fadigati, Achille Pintonello and Annibale Vitellozzi	
Town Hall and Church	(Finland) Seinäjoki	1950	Alvar Aalto	
Sydney Opera House	(Australia) Sydney	1955	Jørn Utzon	233
Toronto City Hall	(Canada) Toronto	1956	Viljo Revell	500
Amsterdam City Hall	(Netherlands) Amsterdam	1967	Wilhelm Holzbauer, Cees Dam, B. Bijvoet and G.H.M. Holt	804
Supreme Court	(Japan) Tokyo	1968	Shin-ichi Okada	217
Centre Georges Pompidou	(France) Paris	1971	Renzo Piano and Richard Rogers	681
San Cataldo Cemetery	(Italy) Modena	1971	Aldo Rossi and Gianni Braghieri	
Hong Kong and Shanghai Bank	Hong Kong	1979	Foster Associates	
Parliament House of Australia	(Australia) Canberra	1979	Romaldo Giurgola	329
Cité des Sciences et de l'Industrie	(France) Paris	1980	Adrien Fainsilber and Sylvain Mercier	
La Grande Arche de la Défense	(France) Paris	1982	Johan Otto von Spreckelsen	420
Parc de la Villette	(France) Paris	1982	Bernard Tschumi	471
Opéra Bastille	(France) Paris	1983	Carlos Ott	750
Carré d'Art	(France) Nîmes	1984	Norman Foster	12
Shonandai Cultural Centre	(Japan) Fujisawa	1985	Itsuko Hasegawa	215
New National Theatre	(Japan) Tokyo	1984	Takahiko Yanagisawa and Tak Associates	228
Tokyo International Forum	(Japan) Tokyo	1987	Rafael Viñoly	395
Kansai Airport	(Japan) Osaka	1988	Renzo Piano Building Workshop	48
Jewish Museum	(Germany) Berlin	1989	Daniel Libeskind	165
Bibliotheca Alexandrina	(Egypt) Alexandria	1989	Snøhetta	523
Bibliothèque Nationale de France	(France) Paris	1989	Dominique Perrault	244
Centre for Japanese Culture	(France) Paris	1989–1990	Masayuki Yamanaka, Kenneth Armstrong & Jennifer Smith	453
Guggenheim Museum Bilbao	(Spain) Bilbao	1991	Frank Gehry	
Kiasma Contemporary Art Museum	(Finland) Helsinki	1992	Steven Holl	516
Austrian Cultural Forum	(United States) New York	1992	Raimund Abraham	226
Royal Danish Library	(Denmark) Copenhagen	1993	Schmidt Hammer Lassen	179
Osanbashi Yokohama International Passenger Terminal	(Japan) Yokohama	1995	Foreign Office Architects	660
Felix Nussbaum Museum	(Germany) Osnabrück	1995	Daniel Libeskind	296
Millennium Bridge	(United Kingdom) London	1996	Norman Foster, Sir Anthony Caro, and Ove Arup	200
Federation Square	(Australia) Melbourne	1997	Lab Architecture Studio	177
GeoCenter Møns Klint	(Denmark) Møn Island	2002	PLH Architects	292
Philharmonie de Paris	(France) Paris	2011	Jean Nouvel	98

== See also ==
- Architectural design values
