= State Museum for Carinthia =

Coordinates: 46°37′16″N 14°18′45″E

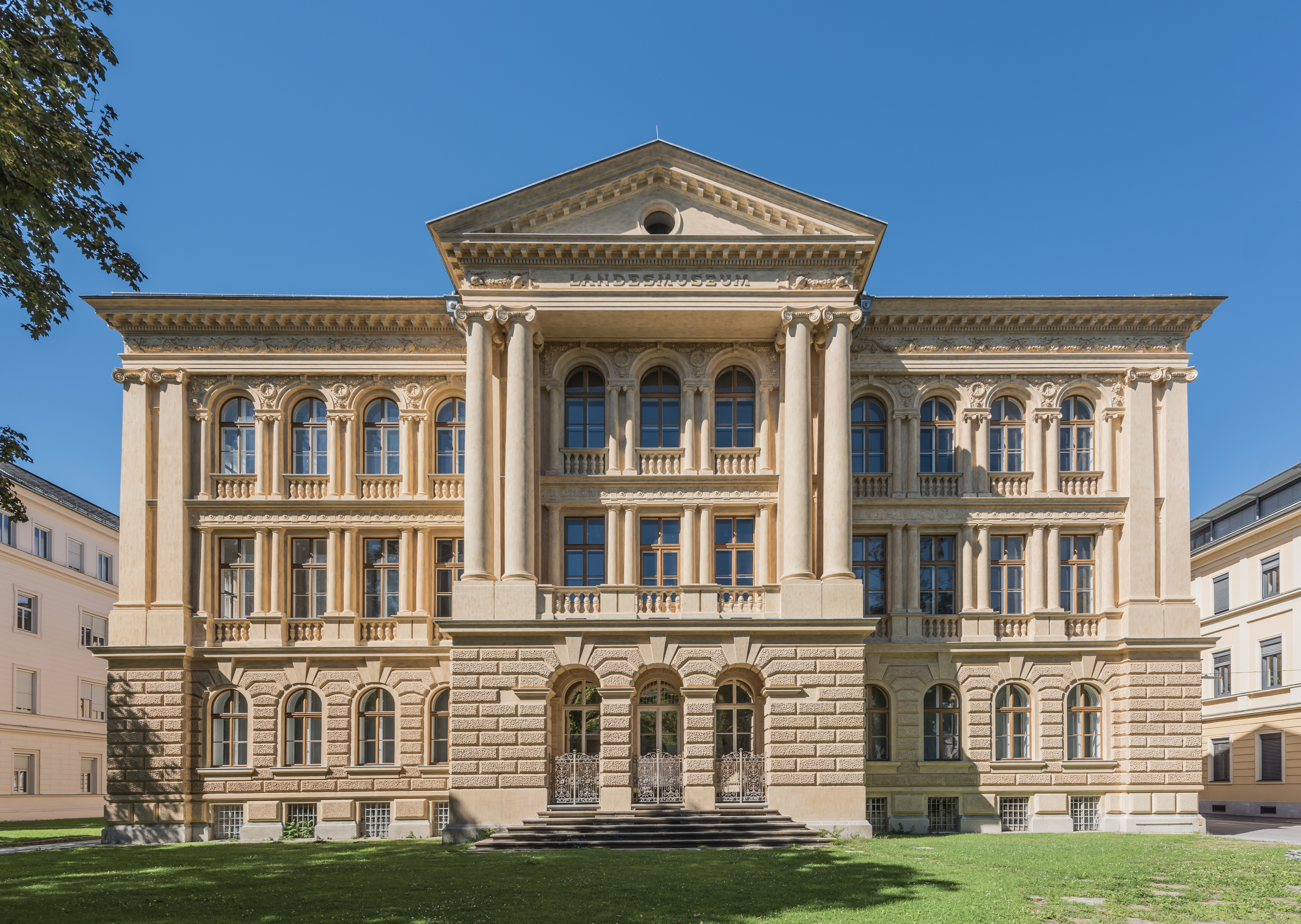
State Museum for Carinthia

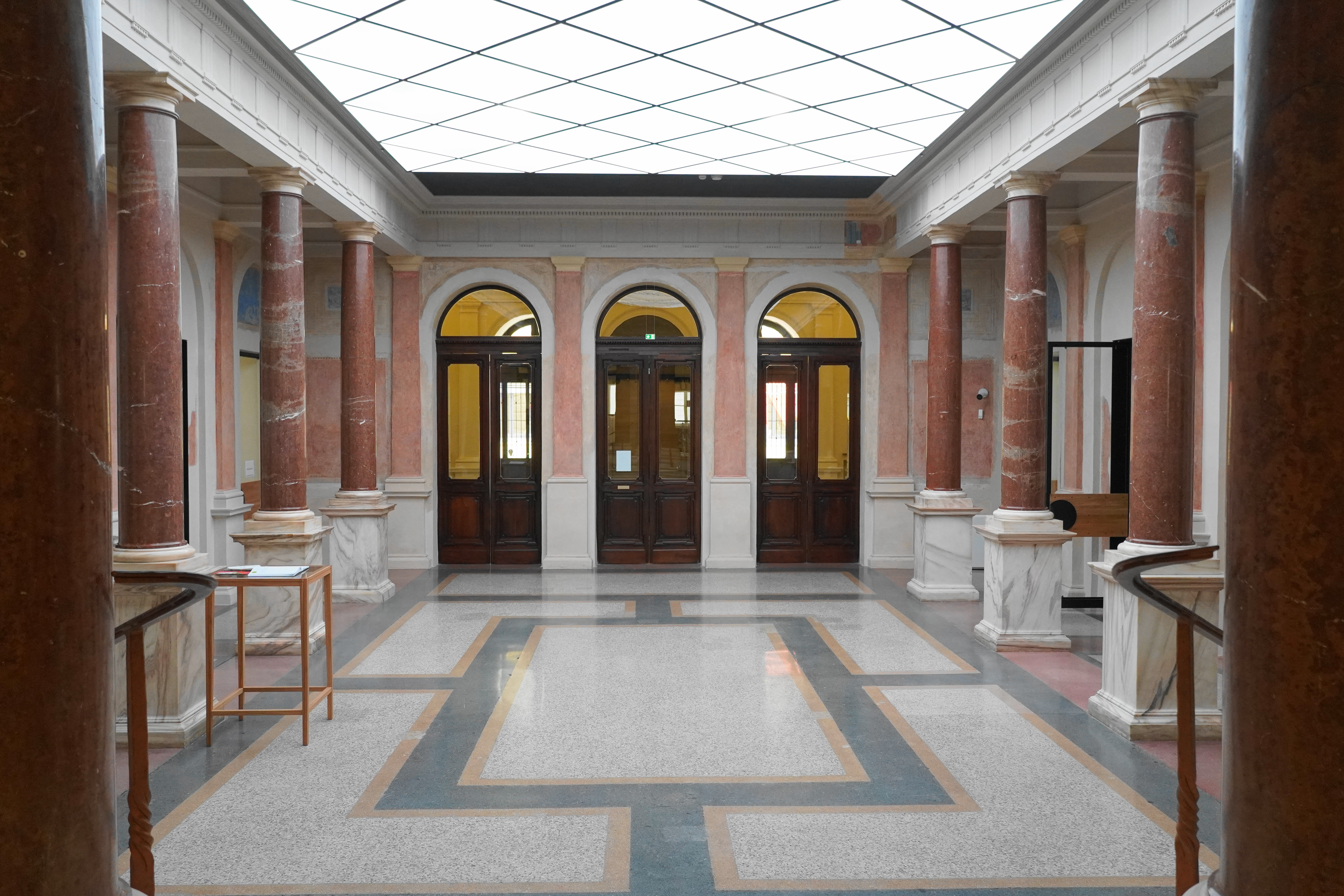
Interior

The kärnten.museum (formerly the Carinthian State Museum or Kärntner Landesmuseum) is a cultural and natural science museum in Klagenfurt am Wörthersee, Carinthia, Austria.

== History ==
The foundation of the History Association for Carinthia in 1844 is also considered the founding year of the State Museum. The association carried out scientific research and the establishment of a library as well as a presentation of cultural-historical exhibits in the Klagenfurt Landhaus. Four years later, the Natural Science Association was founded, which set up a Natural History Museum at Kardinalplatz. Its exhibits were also housed in the Landhaus from 1861 onwards.

The constantly growing collections of the two institutions soon led to space problems, so a commission began planning for a new building in 1877. On April 24, 1879, the foundation stone for the new building was laid, which was built according to the plans of Klagenfurt architect Gustav Gugitz and financed by an interest-free loan from the Carinthian Savings Bank. The museum building, built in the style of the Neo-Renaissance and resembling a palace, was opened on July 10, 1884. The capstone in the stairway was laid by Crown Prince Rudolf, which is why the museum is also referred to as "Rudolfinum."

The folkloric collections of the History Association were supplemented after 1922 by those of the Carinthian National Association. The museum was continued under the name "Carinthian Homeland Museum" after a re-foundation in 1925. During the Second World War, the building was heavily damaged by bombs. In the post-war period, it was rebuilt with state funds and the cultural and natural science show collections were newly set up. Both the building and the scientific staff were taken over by the state of Carinthia, and the collections were transferred to the state of Carinthia through contractual agreements that regulated the continuation and activities of the associations.

== Locations ==
- Main House (closed from 2014 to 2022. Reopened on November 21, 2022)
- State Library: In October 2019, the new collection and research center, the new headquarters of the State Museum, was opened with 12,000 m^{2} of space in the south of Klagenfurt.

In addition to these 2 houses in Museumgasse Klagenfurt, the State Museum operates five external locations:

- Coat of arms hall of the Klagenfurt country house
- Carinthian Botanical Center with the Klagenfurt Botanical Garden
- Carinthian folklore institute with attached furniture museum in Maria Saal
- Magdalensberg Archaeological Park
- Roman Museum in Teurnia

=== General renovation of the main house from 2020 ===
The main house was closed in 2014 after water damage, previously the operation had already been reduced due to construction defects. As part of an architectural competition, the proposal of the architectural office Winkler+Ruck was chosen for the general renovation of the building. The planning is done in cooperation with architect Ferdinand Certov. In January 2020, the plans were presented: The courtyard is to be covered with a transparent glass roof, the Museumgasse is to be made traffic-calmed. The future exhibition is to focus on the earth's history, the nature of Carinthia and historical milestones in the history of the country.
