= Heldenplatz =

Central square in Vienna, Austria

Coordinates: 48.206629°N 16.362913°E

Heldenplatz in front of the Hofburg Palace

Heldenplatz (German: Heroes' Square) is a public space in front of the Hofburg Palace in Vienna, Austria. Located in the Innere Stadt borough, the President of Austria resides in the adjoining Hofburg wing, while the Federal Chancellery is on adjacent Ballhausplatz.

Many important actions and events took place here, most notably Adolf Hitler's ceremonial announcement of the Austrian Anschluss to Nazi Germany on 15 March 1938.

== History ==
After the Napoleonic War of the Fifth Coalition, the Austrian defeat in the 1809 Battle of Wagram and the Treaty of Schönbrunn, the remaining bastions of Hofburg Palace were slighted and replaced by a curtain wall with the—still preserved—Outer Castle Gate (Äußeres Burgtor). Inside the Hofburg walls, several squares and gardens were laid out, including the Volksgarten public park.

=== Kaiserforum ===
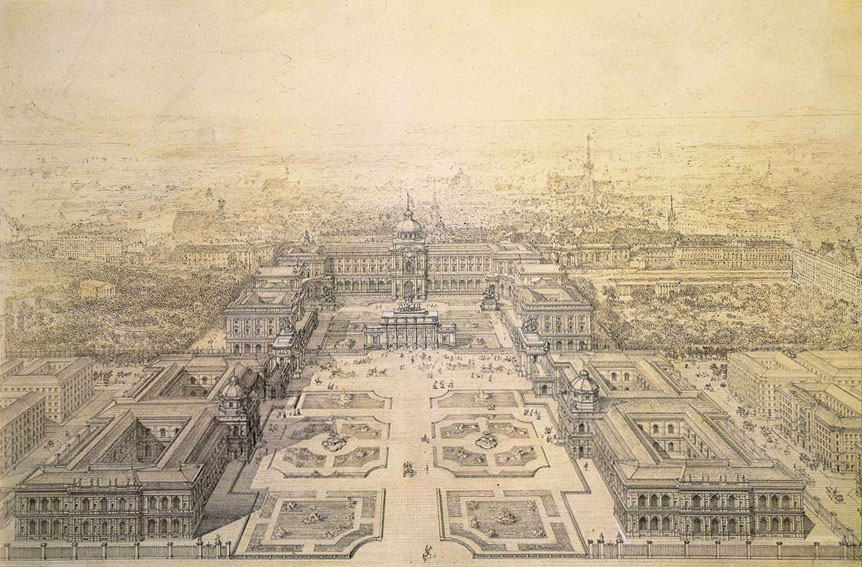
Blueprint of the planned Kaiserforum by Gottfried Semper

The present-day Heldenplatz on the former outer plaza of the Hofburg was built in the course of the lavish Ringstraße boulevard project under the reign of Emperor Francis Joseph. The planned Kaiserforum (imperial forum), however, was never completed. From 1864 onwards, renowned architects like Carl von Hasenauer, Theophil Hansen and Heinrich Ferstel competed presenting their drafts, superseded by Gottfried Semper in 1869.

Semper designed a wide-scale 'general plan', extending from the Leopold Wing of Hofburg Palace in the northeast beyond the Ringstraße to Maria-Theresien-Platz between the mirror-imaged buildings of the Kunsthistorisches Museum and the Naturhistorisches Museum up to the nowadays Museumsquartier in the southwest. Construction started in 1871 and from 1881 the Neue Burg Wing was erected. When the masons' work ceased in 1913, the northwestern part in the Volksgarten park remained unfinished. It offers a panoramic view of the Ringstraße with the Austrian Parliament Building, the Rathaus (town hall), and the Burgtheater.

=== Heroes ===
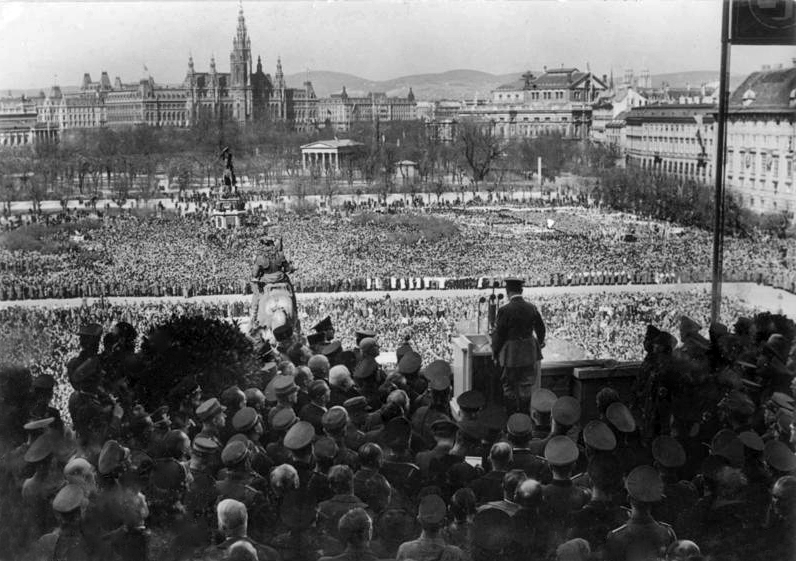
Hitler announcing the Anschluss on the Heldenplatz, March 1938

On the plaza, there are two equestrian statues designed by Anton Dominik Fernkorn with socles by Eduard van der Nüll. The statue of Archduke Charles of Austria, modelled on a popular painting by Johann Peter Krafft, was inaugurated in 1860. It was meant to glorify the Habsburg dynasty as great Austrian military leaders and underline the leadership of Austria within the German Confederation, though they just had suffered a crushing defeat at the bloody Battle of Solferino. The second statue of Prince Eugene of Savoy was inaugurated in 1865, one year before the Austrian defeat in the Battle of Königgrätz.

The Outer Castle Gate on the south side remained standing when the fortification walls were dismantled. Erected in 1824 by Pietro Nobile according to plans designed by Luigi Cagnola, and inaugurated by Emperor Francis I of Austria in the honour of the veterans of the Napoleonic Wars, it was rebuilt as a war memorial in 1933/34 and houses a Tomb of the Unknown Soldier.

== Literature ==
The historical connotation of Hitler's speech remains strong in the public perception. This is also the reason why Heldenplatz has been the subject of several works of literature, most prominently of Thomas Bernhard's drama Heldenplatz and a poem by Ernst Jandl titled wien: heldenplatz.
