= Vienna Arsenal =

Military complex in Vienna, Austria

Coordinates: 48°10′55″N 16°23′27″E

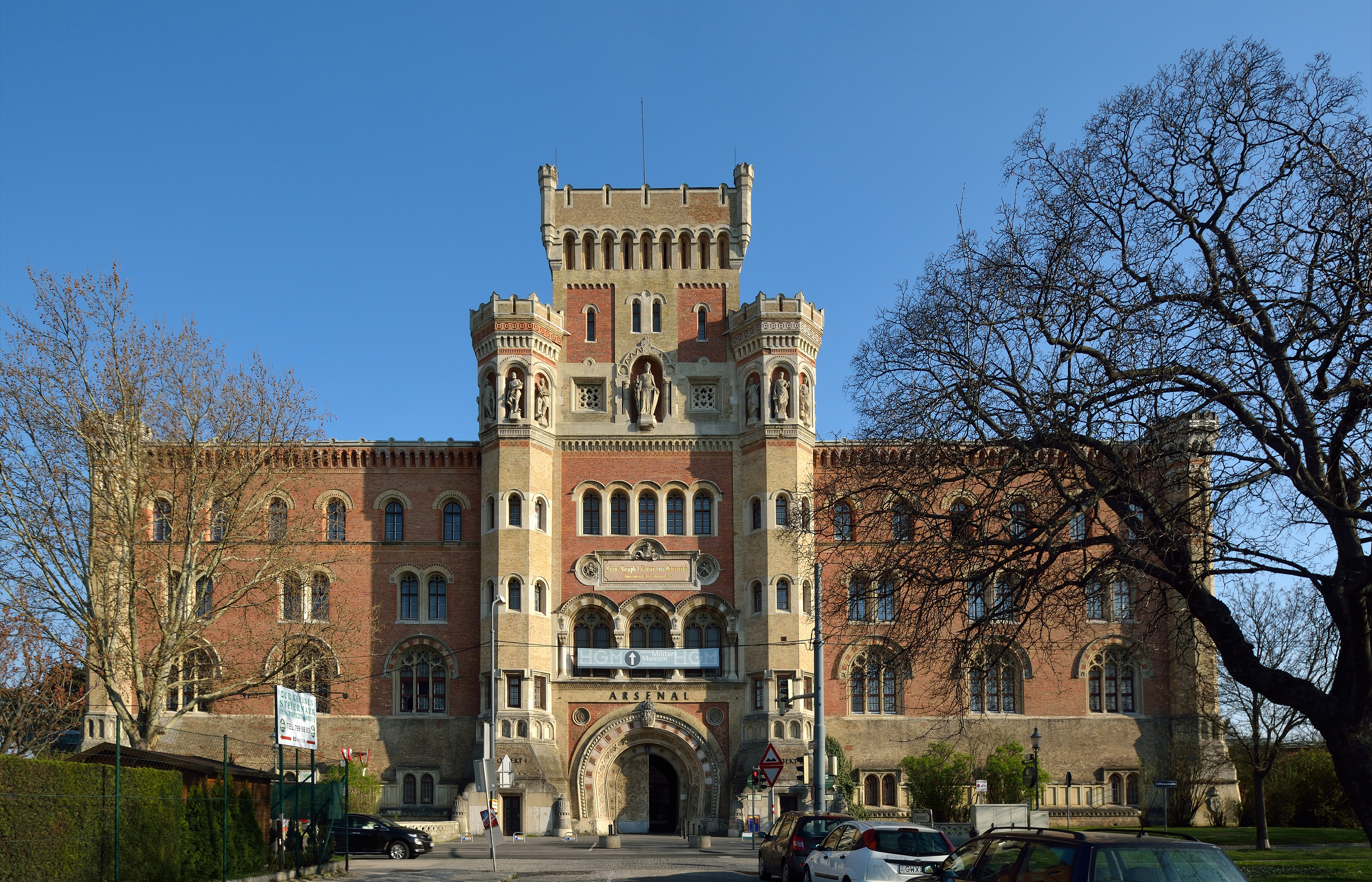
Former main command building of the Arsenal, today part of the Museum of Military History, Vienna

The Arsenal is a former military complex of buildings in the south-east of Vienna in the third district.

Several brick buildings in a rectangle layout make up the complex which is located on a bank south of the Landstraßer Gürtel. It is the most distinguished building group of Romantic historicism in Vienna and was constructed in Italian-medieval and Byzantine-Islamic style. Essentially the complex is still preserved in its original form; only a few workshop buildings within the courtyard have been replaced.

== History ==
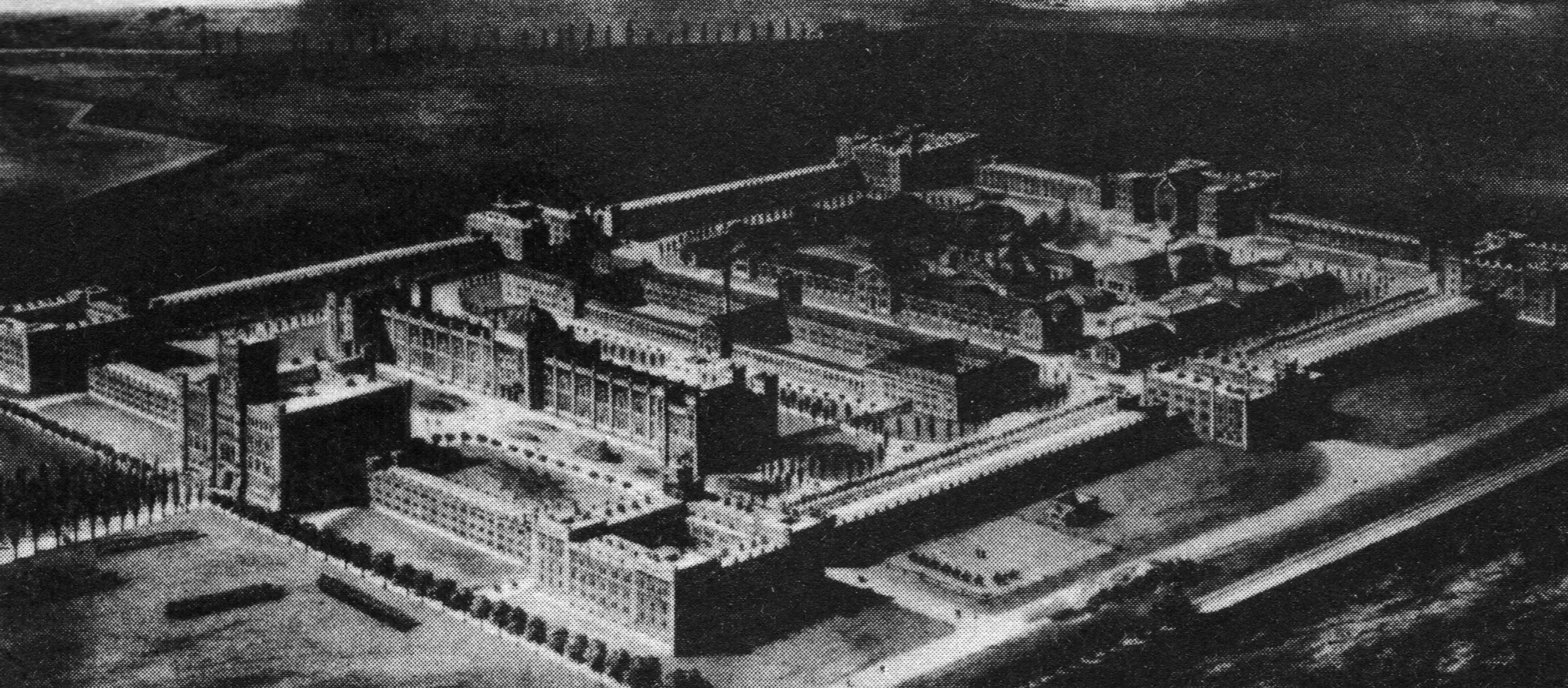
Vienna Arsenal shortly after completion 1855

The complex was built in the aftermath of the March Revolution 1848, between 1848 and 1856, and was the first of three buildings which replaced the old city fortifications. The area was split into sectors where construction was supervised by the architects Carl Roesner, Anton Pius Riegel, August Sicard von Sicardsburg, Eduard van der Nüll, Theophil von Hansen and Ludwig Förster. The master builder was Leopold Mayr. The Heeresgeschichtliches Museum took until 1891 to finish. In the aftermath there were multiple expansions. During the First World War the complex served as a barracks and armoury.

The Arsenal was not always part of the Third District; from its construction until 1938 it belonged to Favoriten. After the Anschluss in 1938, Vienna was reorganized to form a new Reichsgau in Nazi Germany. Inner city borders were reassigned and the Arsenal as well as the area south of it became part of Landstraße.

In 1945 the Arsenal was heavily damaged by bombing, however after the war most it was rebuilt into its original form. In the following years, several new constructions, primarily in the south, were undertaken, such as the workshops for the State Theatres (1959 until 1963) and the rehearsal stage for the Burgtheater in the 1990s. From 1961 until 1963 the Fernmeldezentralamt and 1973 buildings for the Post- und Telegraphendirektion für Wien, Niederösterreich und das Burgenland (Mail and Telegraph Authority for Vienna, Lower Austria and Burgenland), today the Technologiezentrum Arsenal (Technology Centre Arsenal) of the Telekom Austria) with the 150-metre high Funkturm Arsenal.

The Österreichisches Forschungs- und Prüfzentrum Arsenal (Austrian Research and Testing Centre Arsenal), today Arsenal Research, was located in the complex. A small part of the complex is still being used by the Austrian army as a barracks. Furthermore, the Zentraldesinfektionsanstalt (central disinfection facility) of Vienna is located there.

Part of the Arsenal now contains housing.

== Testing facility ==
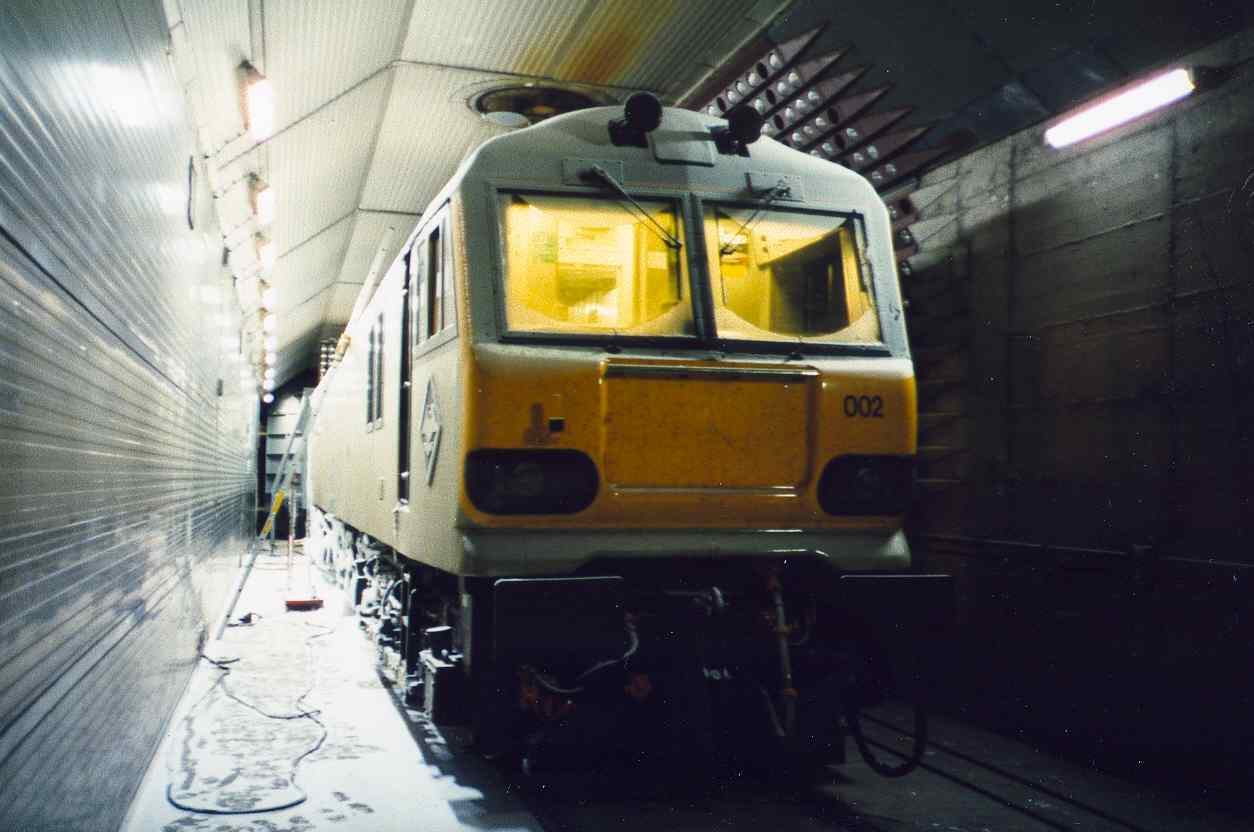
Class 92/CC 92000 Channel Tunnel locomotive during −25°C cold-weather testing in 1994.

An area of the former site was used by the not-for-profit Rail Tec Arsenal (RTA) research centre to provide climatic validation for rail and public transport vehicles.

This facility contained a two climatic wind tunnels capable of simulating all combinations of weather by varying temperature, air pressure, humidity and wind-speed. The long wind tunnel allowed testing up to three railway vehicles at once and had an operation length of 100 metres. The short wind tunnel allowed testing of single vehicles or buses. In 2003 RTA moved to new facilities in Vienna's district of Floridsdorf.

== See also ==
- Doriot Climatic Chambers a similar testing facility in the United States

== Gallery ==
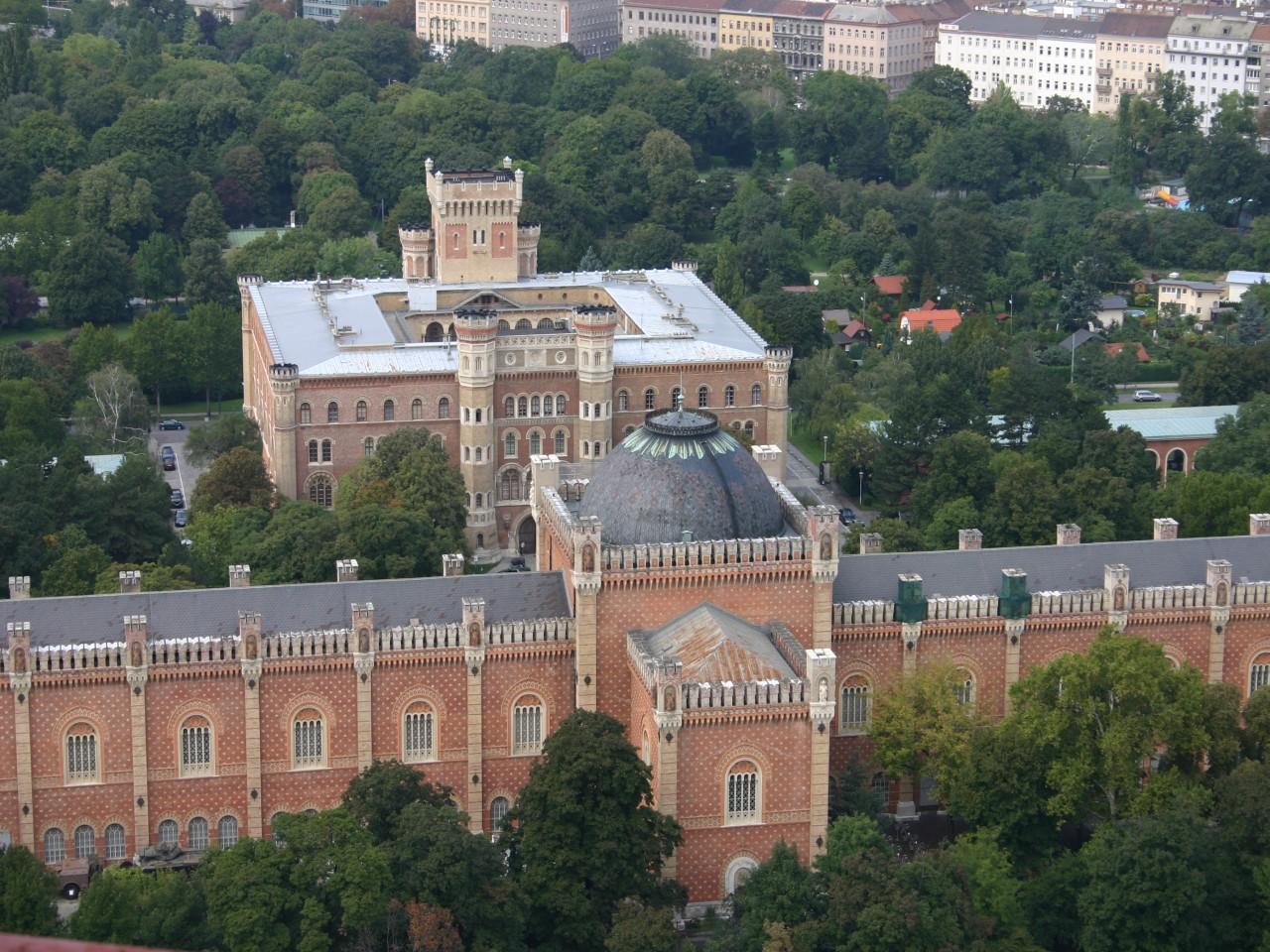
Museum of Military History

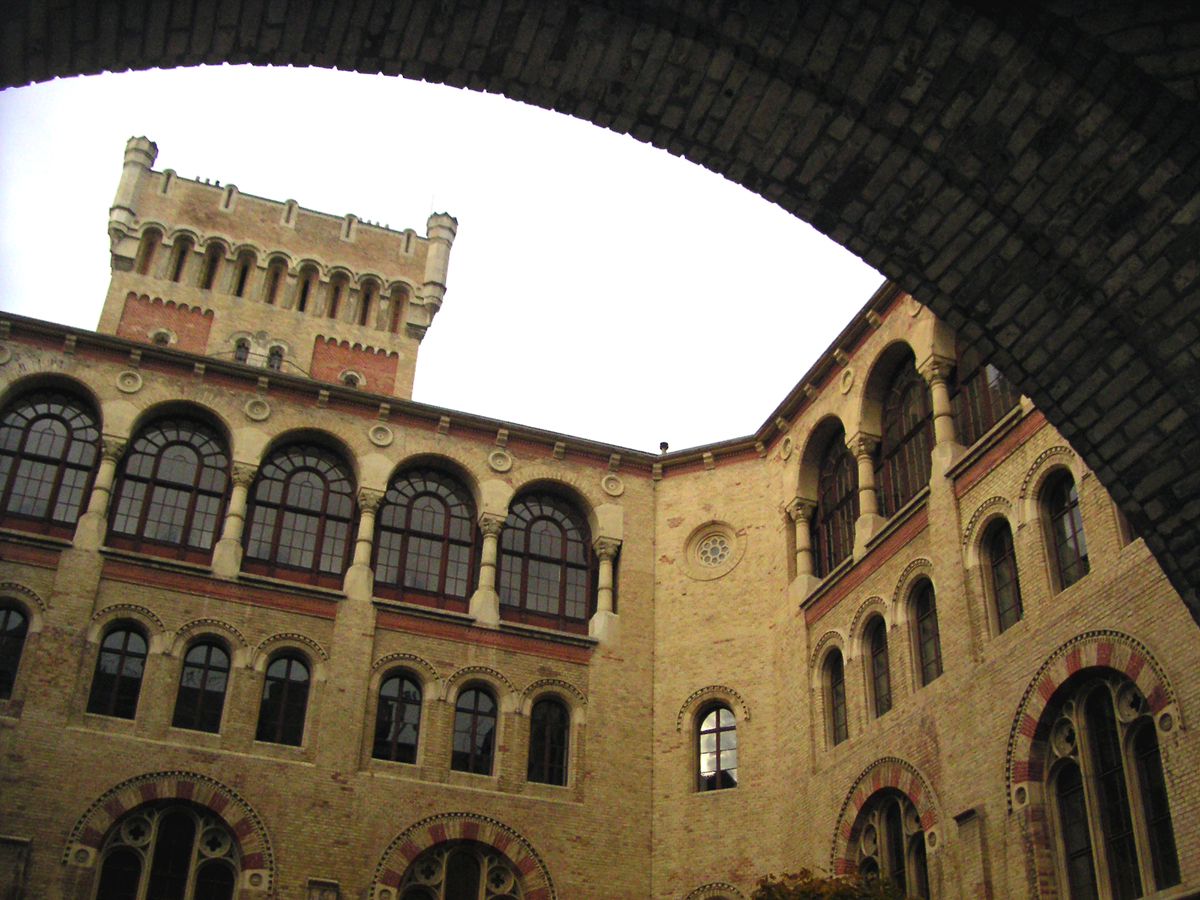
Courtyard of "Objekt 1", the earlier commandant's office

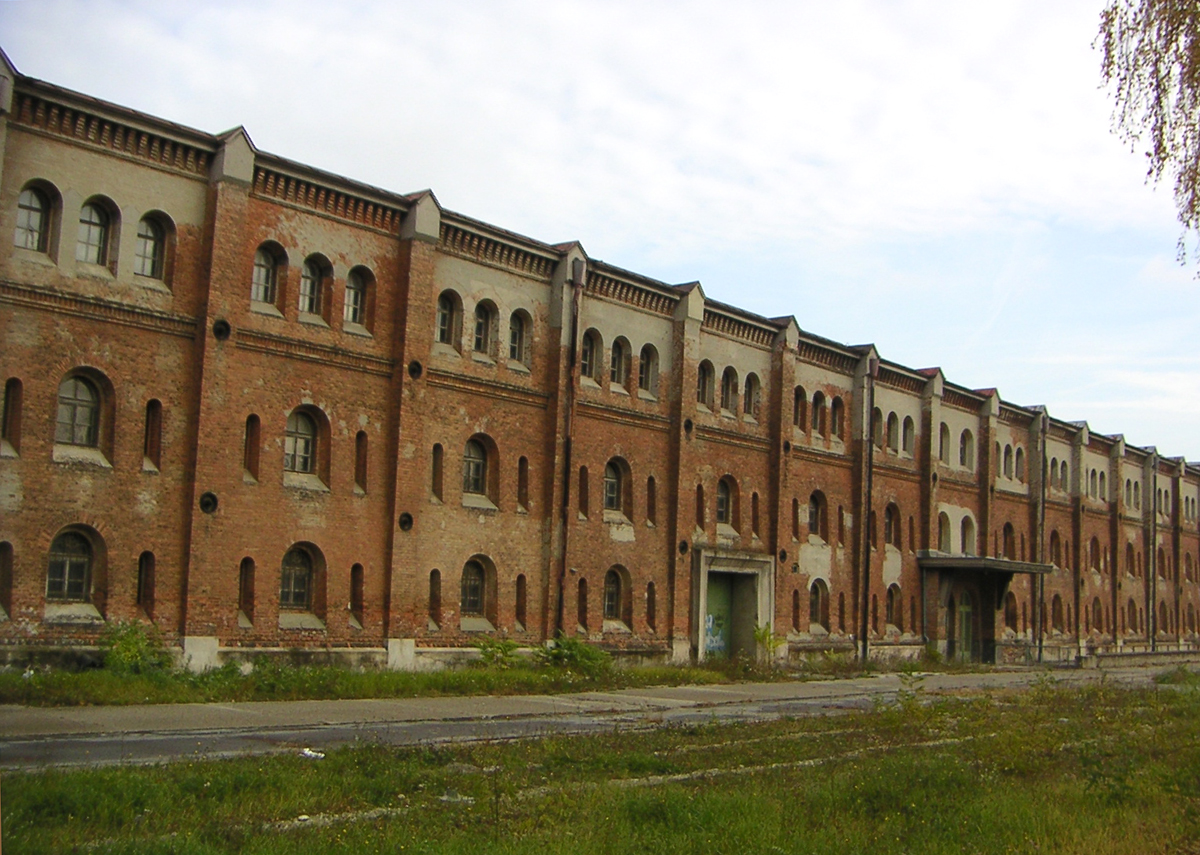
Depots at the Arsenalstraße

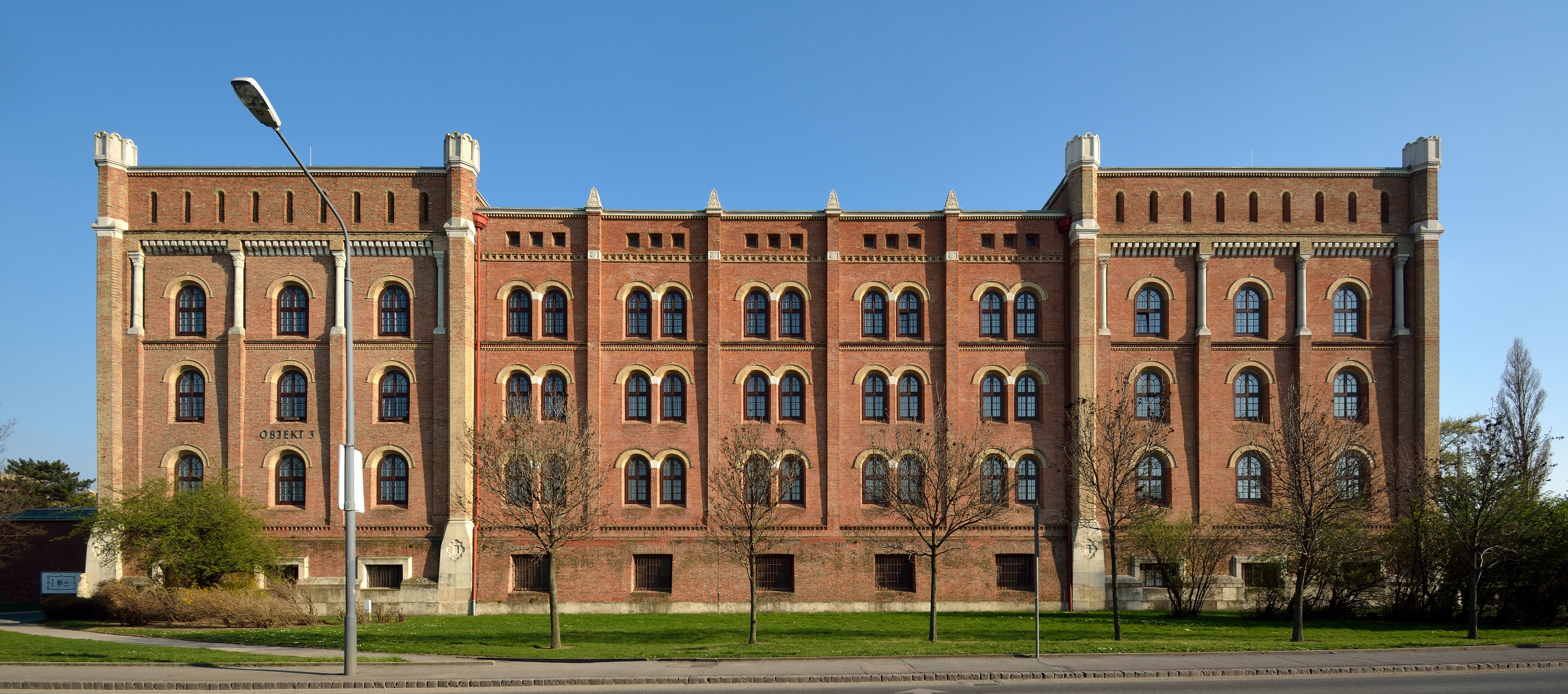
Residential building Objekt 3
