= August Sicard von Sicardsburg =

Austrian architect (1813–1868)

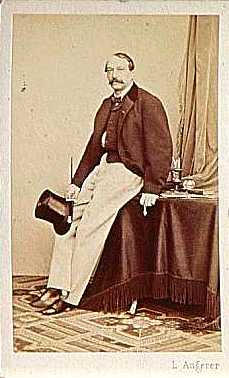
- Born: 6 December 1813; Buda
- Died: 11 June 1868 (aged 54); Weidling, Austria
- Occupation: Architect
- Known for: Vienna State Opera

August Sicard von Sicardsburg (6 December 1813 – 11 June 1868) was an Austrian architect. He is best remembered as the co-architect of the Vienna State Opera, together with Eduard van der Nüll.

Sicardsburg was born in Buda. He studied architecture at the Vienna University of Technology under Peter von Nobile, and together with van der Nüll. In 1843, he became professor at the Vienna Academy.

Karl Freiherr von Hasenauer was one of his students.

Sicardsburg died in 1868 in Weidling, Austria, of tuberculosis, six weeks after his partner Eduard van der Nüll committed suicide; neither saw the opening of the Vienna State Opera in 1869.

== List of works ==
=== Along with Eduard van der Nüll ===
- Schutzengelbrunnen (fountain), 1843–1846
- Sofiensaal, 1845
- Carltheater, 1846–1847
- Arsenal 1849–1855
- Vienna State Opera, 1861–1869
- Haas-Haus, 1866–1868 (now site of the unrelated Haas-Haus)
- Palais Larisch-Mönich, 1867–1868
- Industriepalast on the occasion of the World Exposition of 1873.
