= Baron Karl von Hasenauer =

Austrian architect

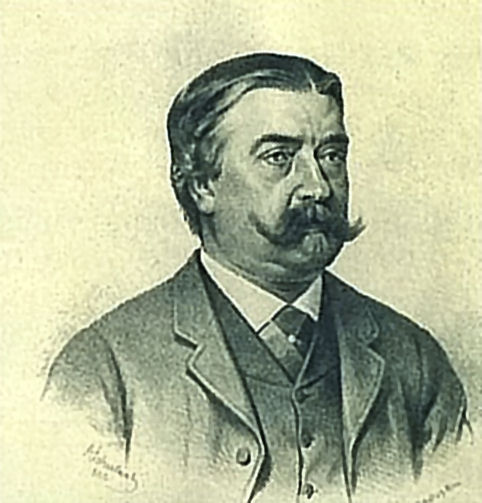
- Baron Karl von Hasenauer (1880)
- Born: 20 July 1833; Vienna, Austria
- Died: 4 January 1894 (aged 60); Vienna, Austria
- Occupation: Architect
- Buildings: Kunsthistorisches Museum; Burgtheater; Neue Hofburg
- Projects: Ringstraße

Baron Karl von Hasenauer (German: Karl Freiherr von Hasenauer [ˈhaːzənaʊɐ]) (20 July 1833 – 4 January 1894) was an important Austrian architect and key representative of the Historismus school.

He created several Neo-Baroque monuments, many around near the Ringstraße in Vienna. He was also a student of August Sicard von Sicardsburg and Eduard van der Nüll. For his outstanding work, he was ennobled by Emperor Franz Joseph I in 1873, and made Freiherr, the equivalent of baron.

Hasenauer was the chief architect for the Vienna World's Fair in 1873. Together with Gottfried Semper he designed the complex with the Maria-Theresia Memorial (1874-1888), Kunsthistorisches Museum (the Museum of Art History) and the Naturhistorisches Museum (Natural History Museum) (1871–1891), the Burgtheater (1874–1888), the Hermesvilla and the Neue Hofburg (1881–1894, completed in 1913).

After a conflict with his former business partner Semper he managed the building of the Hofburg alone. The conflict over attribution of their joint projects continues to this day between the supporters of Semper and Hasenauer. However, because the older master Semper is credited with the Semperoper in Dresden, Hasenauer receives more credit for the architecture in the Ringstraße.

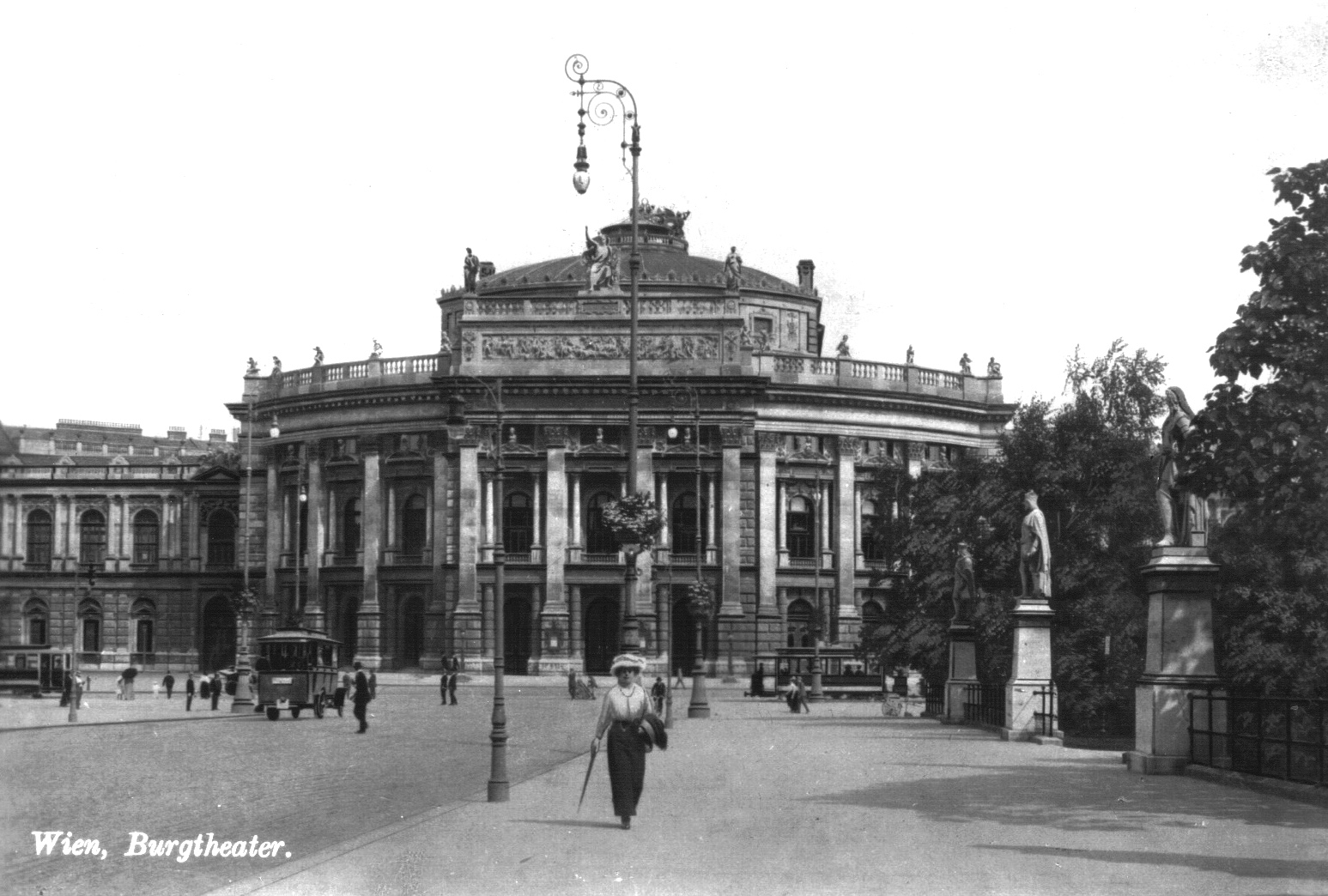
The Burgtheater in Vienna, shortly after its completion, built by Karl von Hasenauer
