= Eduard van der Nüll =

Austrian architect

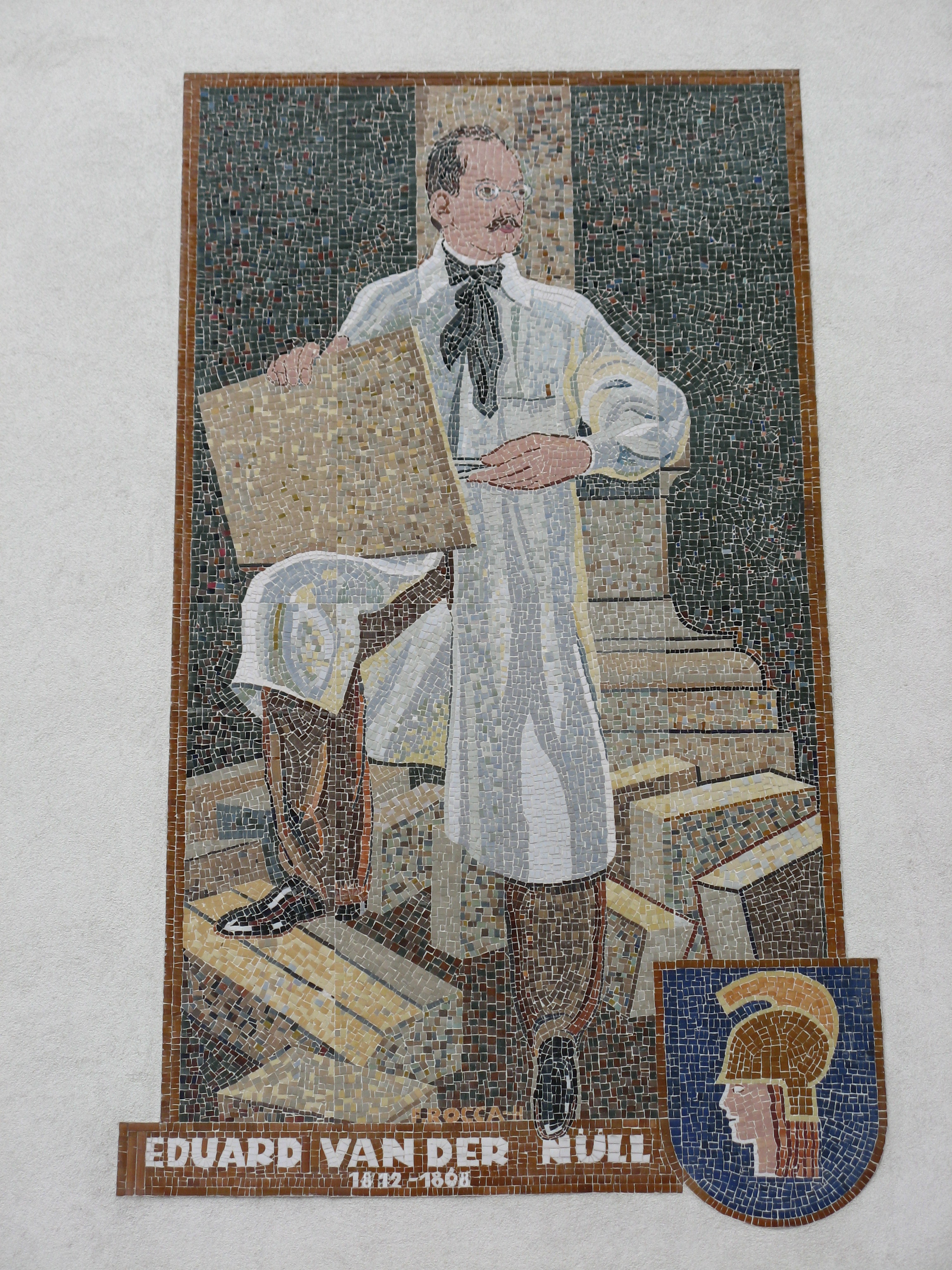
Mosaic corner of Van-der-Nüll-Gasse/Davidgasse streets in Vienna-Favoriten

Eduard van der Nüll (9 January 1812 (baptized) – 3 April 1868) was an Austrian architect, who was one of the great masters in the historicist style of Vienna's Ringstrasse.

== Life and work ==
Eduard van der Nüll was born and died in Vienna. After studying at the Vienna Polytechnical Institute (alongside, among others, Peter von Nobile, Paul Wilhelm Eduard Sprenger and Carl Roesner), he and his friend August Sicard von Sicardsburg made extensive trips through Western Europe for purposes of study. In 1844, he became a professor at the Academy with a new Chair created for him in Perspektive und Ornamentik (perspective and ornamentation).

He remained associated with Sicardsburg for life, in a professional and artistic symbiosis. While Sicardsburg handled primarily practical and technical questions, van der Nüll was responsible for issues of decoration and aesthetics. Their first joint project was in 1847, creating the Carltheater in Vienna-Leopoldstadt (since destroyed). In the 1850s, they added some sections to the Vienna Arsenal, such as the command building whilst Van der Nüll was solely responsible for the interior design of the Altlerchefelder Parish Church, the most important church project of the decade.

Their most important joint project, however, was the Vienna Court Opera (Wiener Staatsoper) in the style of the Neo-Renaissance, during 1861–1869, built as the first public building along the Vienna Ringstrasse. In 1860, the project had been submitted to competition and won by the two architects.

Their design failed to match the monumentality of the Heinrichshof opposite (destroyed in World War II, and in 1955 replaced by the Opernringhof). Criticism from both the Emperor and a press campaign against the pair of architects described the disappointment of the Viennese public and suggested that the building was merely a half-success. After the street level in front of the opera house was raised by a metre, the opera was described as the "sunken chest" and - in analogy to the military disaster of 1866 - "the Königgratz of Construction".

Eduard van der Nüll was deeply troubled by the criticism and hanged himself on 4 April 1868. His partner Sicardsburg died nearly 10 weeks later, diagnosed with tuberculosis. It was said that the Emperor had been so shocked by the suicide of Eduard van der Nüll, that from then on he responded to all new art phenomena with the standard phrase, "It was very beautiful, I liked it a lot".

Eduard van der Nüll was buried in an honorary grave in Vienna's Central Cemetery (Group 32 A, No. 5). In 1875, the Van-der-Nüll street in the Favoriten District of Vienna was named after him.

== List of works ==
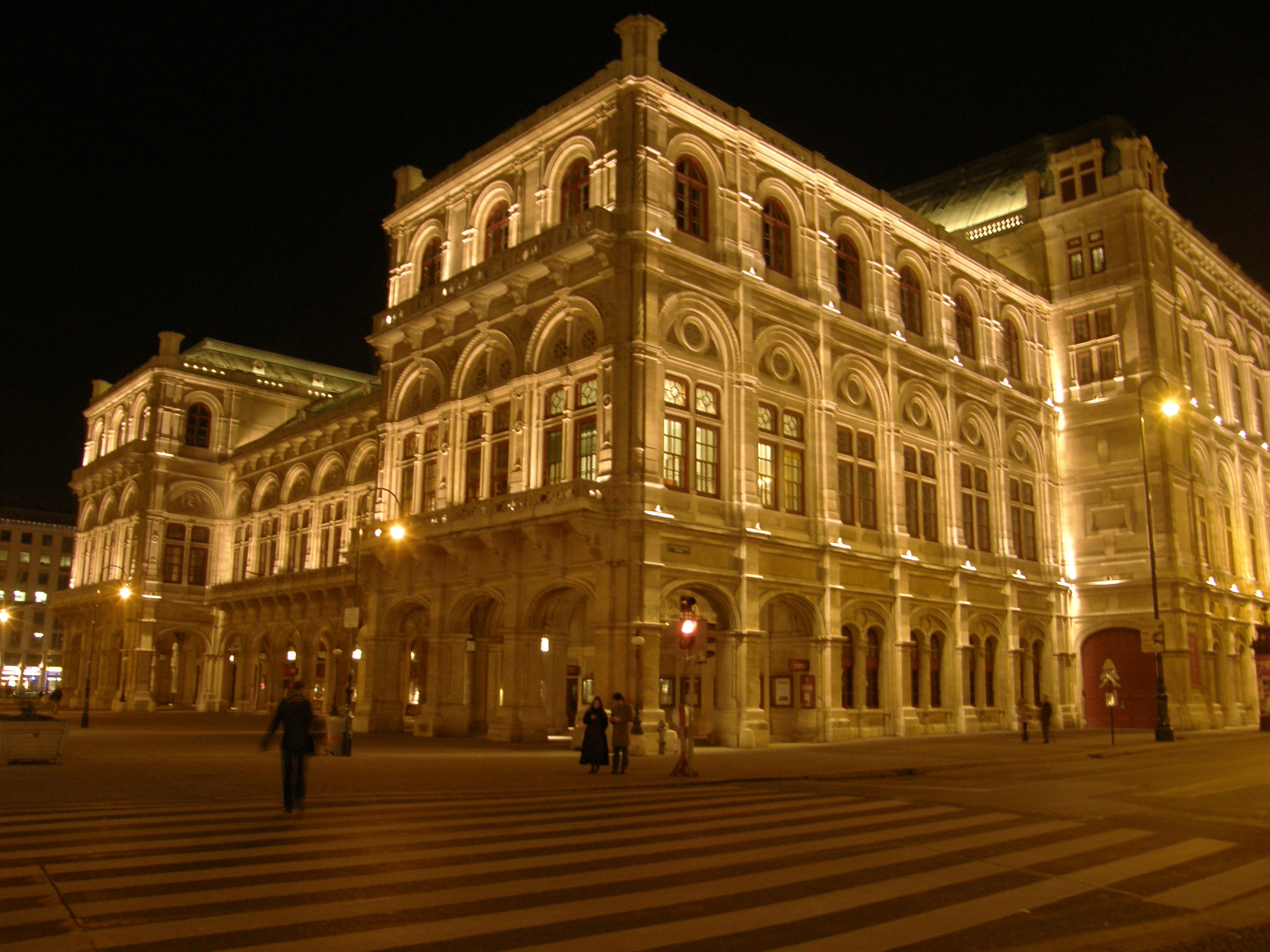
Wiener Staatsoper (opera house).

Alone:

- Altlerchefelder Parish Church, 1848–1861
- Monument for Archduke Karl of Austria-Teschen at Heldenplatz, 1859.
- Monument for Prince Eugen of Savoy at Heldenplatz, 1856.

Along with August Sicard von Sicardsburg:

- Schutzengelbrunnen (fountain), 1843–1846
- Sophienbad, 1845
- Carltheater, 1846–1847
- Arsenal of Vienna, 1849–1855
- Vienna State Opera, 1861–1869
- Haas-Haus, 1866–1868 (now site of the unrelated Haas-Haus)
- Palais Larisch-Mönich, 1867–1868
- Industriepalast on the occasion of the World Exposition of 1873.
