= Haas House =

Building in Vienna, Austria

Coordinates: 48°12′29″N 16°22′16″E

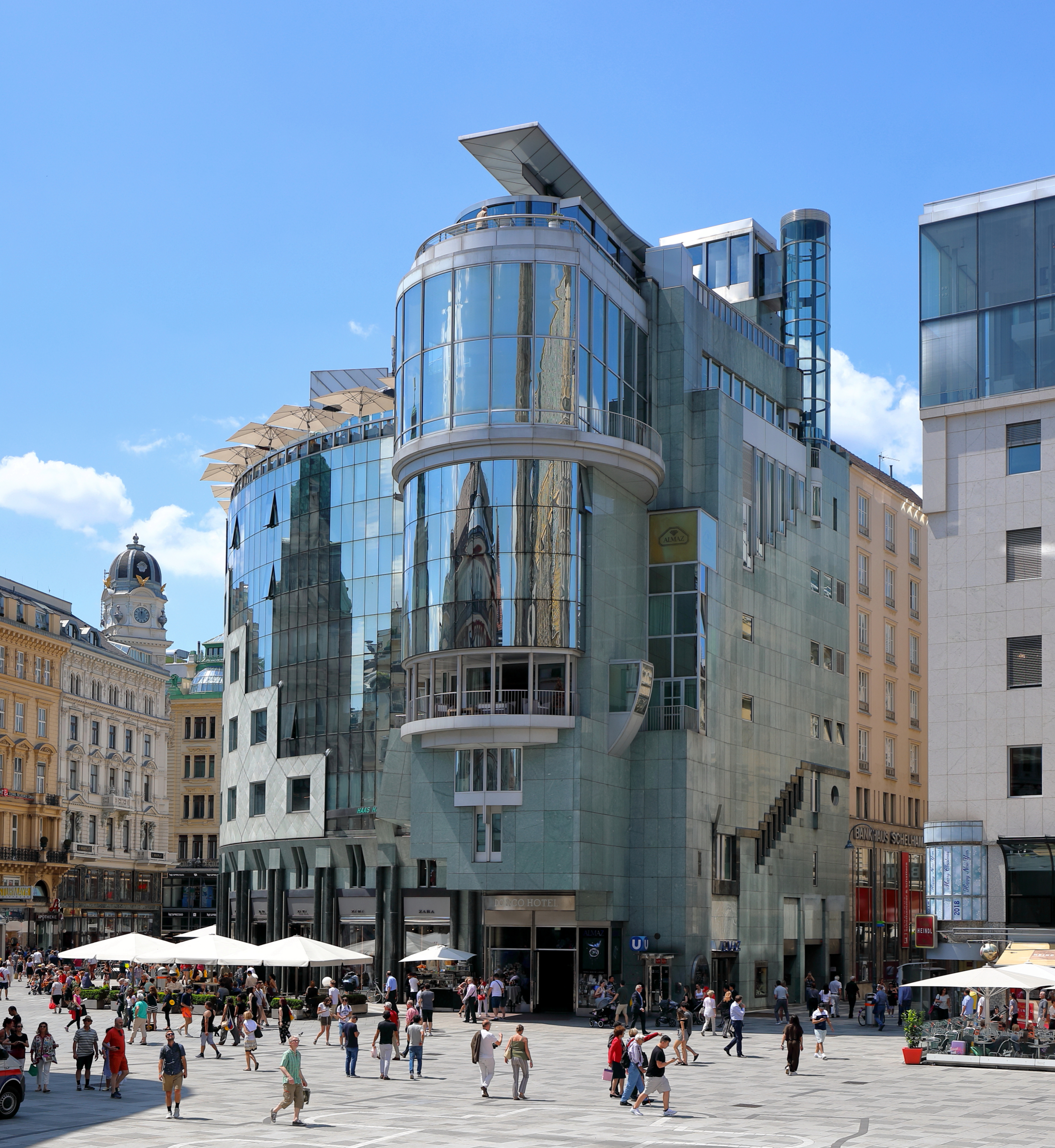
The Haas House

The Haas House is a building in Vienna, Austria, at the Stock-im-Eisen-Platz.

Designed by the Austrian architect Hans Hollein, it is a building in the postmodernist style and was completed in 1990. The building is located at the site of the former Philipp Haas & Söhne flagship department store dating to 1867, destroyed during World War II and rebuilt in 1953. The use of the Haas-Haus is divided between retail and a restaurant. The building is considered controversial owing to its contrast with the adjacent Stephansdom cathedral.

In December 2014, Uniqa Insurance Group sold the building to the Austrian catering company Do & Co, which now uses it as their headquarters.
