= Winged serpent =

Winged serpent or Winged Serpent may refer to:

== Arts, entertainment, and media ==
- Winged Serpent (Sliding Quadrants), a 1985 album by Cecil Taylor
- Q – The Winged Serpent, a 1982 American horror film
- Cry of the Winged Serpent, a 2007 American horror film
- The Vengeance of the Winged Serpent, a 1984 French comedy film

== Folklore, mythology, and religion ==
- Amphiptere, a type of winged serpent found in European heraldry
- Feathered Serpent, a prominent supernatural entity or deity found in many Mesoamerican religions
- Guivre, a type of serpentine mythical creature
- Lindworm, a mythical creature in Northern, Western and Central European folklore that traditionally has the shape of a giant serpent monster
- Wyvern, a type of mythical dragon with two legs, two wings, and often a pointed tail

== See also ==
- Flying serpent (disambiguation)
