= Amphiptere =

Type of winged serpent found in European heraldry

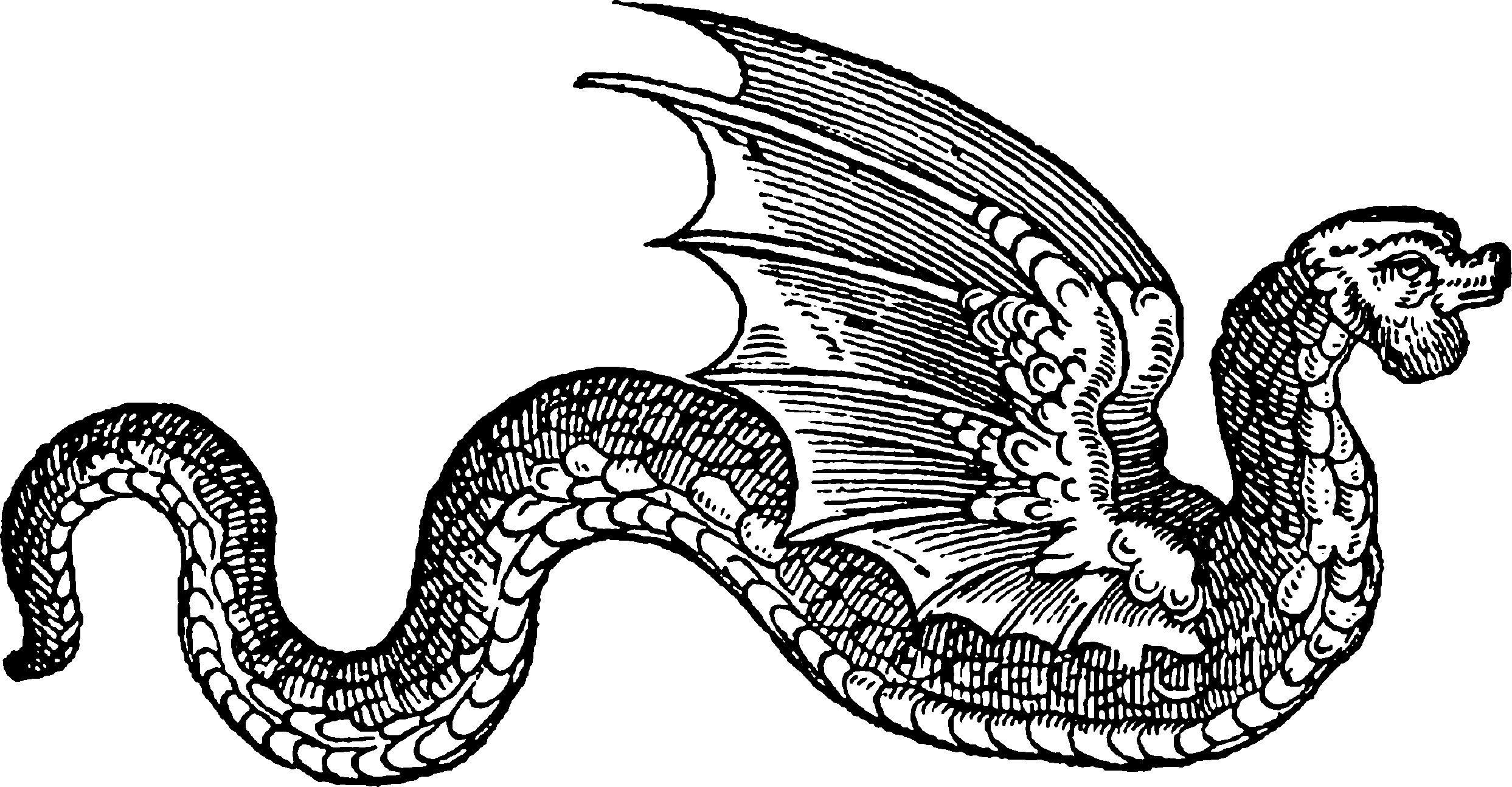
Amphiptere by Edward Topsell (1608)

Amphiptere (also called Amphithere, Amphitere, or Phipthere; meaning bi-winged, two-winged) is a type of winged serpent found in European heraldry.

== Appearance ==
A heraldic amphiptere

Amphipteres generally were said to have light-colored feathers like a sunrise, a serpentine body similar to a lindworm, bat-like wings with feathers covering most of the forearm and often greenish in coloration, and a long tail much like a wyvern's tail. Others are described as entirely covered in feathers with a spiked tail, bird-like wings, and a beak-like snout.

== Usage ==
Amphipteres saw infrequent use as heraldic devices. Amphipteres are present on the arms of the House of Potier, which depict a bendlet purpure between two amphipteres. The Potier heraldry also uses amphipteres as supporters, as do those of the Duke of Tresmes and Duke of Gesvres.

== Modern fiction ==
Amphipteres appear in other modern fictional works.

- The Dragonology series of books employ a conceit that dragons are real and that the amphithere is a species that inspired myths about Quetzalcōātl.
- In the Digimon franchise, Airdramon is modeled after an amphiptere.
- In the 2021 film Godzilla vs. Kong, Kong fought against Amphiptere-type creatures called Warbats in the Hollow Earth.
- In the board game Wyrmspan, a dragon themed card/engine building game based on Wingspan, several playable dragon cards are classified as amphiptere.

== See also ==
- Amphitheatre
- Feathered Serpent
- Flying serpent (disambiguation)
- Jaculus
- Lindworm
- Winged serpent
- Wyvern
