= Imperial Sceptre (Brazil) =

Piece of the Brazilian Crown Jewels

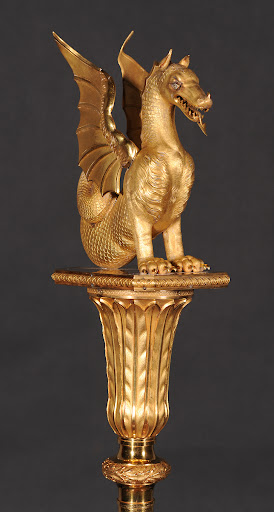
The Imperial Sceptre

The Imperial Scepter, is a piece of the Brazilian Crown Jewels, originally created for the acclamation of Emperor Pedro I of Brazil.

== History ==
Made in 1822 by the Brazilian goldsmith Manuel Ignacio de Loiola under the direction of Ignacio Luís da Costa, the scepter was only used for important official occasions. It was seen as an extension of the sovereign arm, an aid to the execution of justice and government. Between 1889 and 1943, it was kept in the coffers of the National Treasury before going to the Imperial Museum, from where it has not moved since.

== Details ==
Measuring more than 2 metres (6.6 ft), the imperial scepter of Brazil was used by both Emperors. It consists of a long hollow handle made of gold-plated brass, decorated at the ends with an engraved gold vegetal decoration of oak leaves and acorn. The capital, in the form of an inverted bell, features stylized leaves and supports a rectangular plate with softened corners.

At the top, a gold wyvern is shown with its tail up, mouth open, forked tongue and eyes made of diamonds.

== See also ==
- Imperial orb

== Sources ==
- Jóias da Coroa Brasileira
