= Lindwurmbrunnen =

Monument in Klagenfurt, Austria

Coordinates: 46°37′26″N 14°18′27″E

Lindwurmbrunnen in Klagenfurt

The Lindwurmbrunnen (German for 'Lindworm fountain') is a civic monument in Klagenfurt, Austria. It consists of a large sculpture of a lindworm or dragon, a statue of Hercules that is sometimes referred to as a "dragon slayer", and a fountain. It is located on the main square of the city, Neuer Platz. The installation of a monumental fountain was partially prompted by a severe city fire in 1514. Work began in 1590 but the monument was not entirely finished until 1636. The sculpture of the dragon is often attributed to sculptor Ulrich Vogelsang, but the attribution is uncertain. The sculpture of Hercules was made by Michael Hönel.

The sculpture of the dragon plays a role in the history of palaeontology. It has been assumed, first by palaeontologist Franz Unger in 1840, to have been inspired by the skull of a woolly rhinoceros (Coelodonta antiquitatis) that was discovered in a gravel pit outside Klagenfurt in 1335. For this reason, the sculpture has been cited as "the earliest reconstruction of an extinct animal". However, critics have pointed to the lack of any conclusive evidence of a direct artistic inspiration between the skull and the dragon sculpture, and the theory has also been called an example of "forced euhemerism".

== Description ==
The Lindwurmbrunnen is located on the main square of Klagenfurt, Neuer Platz. It consists of a water basin and fountain, a large sculpture of a dragon or lindworm, and a statue of Hercules. A decorative wrought iron fence surrounds the monument. The stone used for construction is local slate; the weight is around six tonnes. The dragon has become a symbol for the city and is sometimes referred to colloquially by local residents as "Lindi". The monument is a popular sightseeing site in Klagenfurt.

== History ==
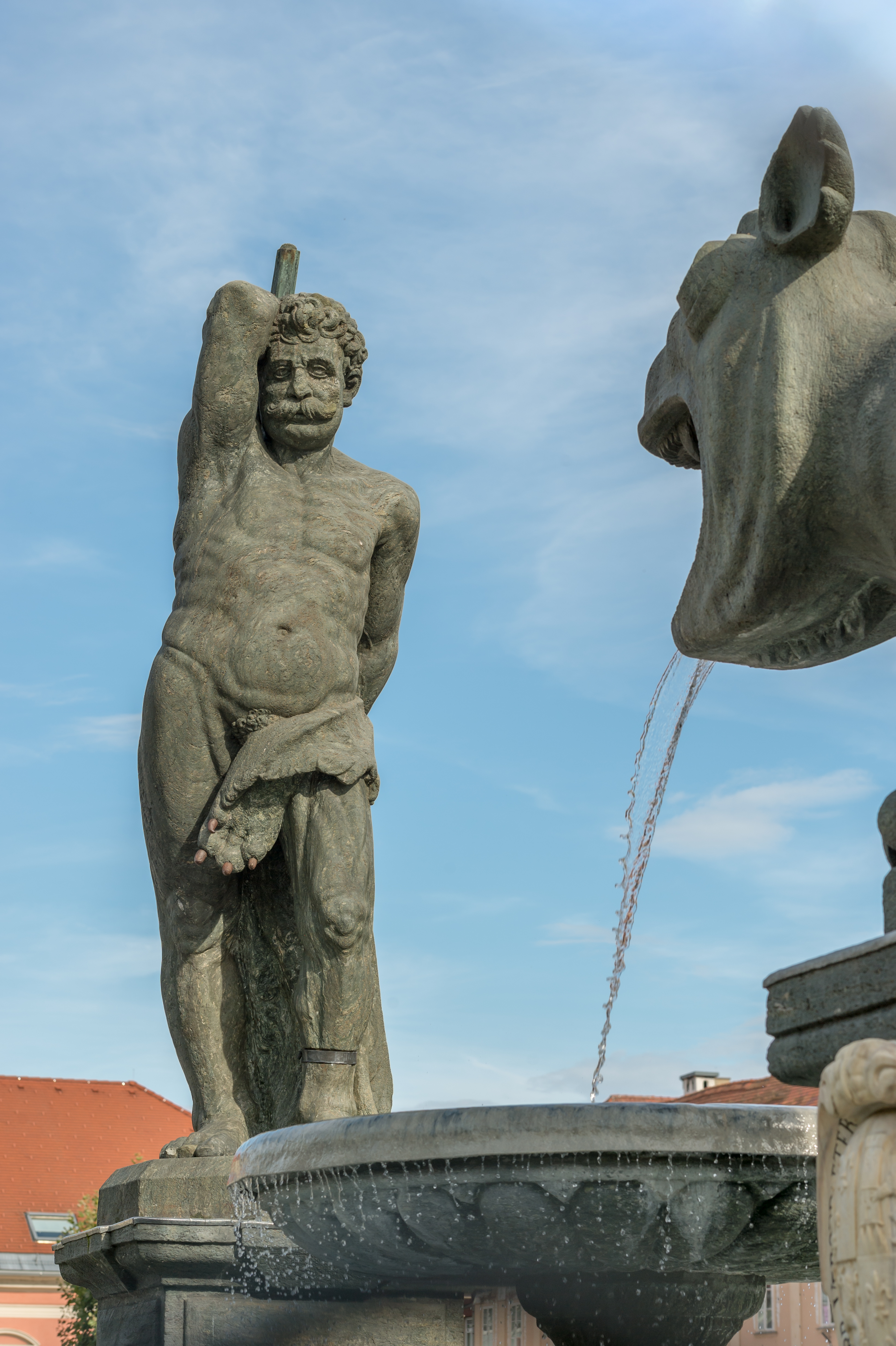
The statue of Hercules, by Michael Hönel, faces the dragon.

A local legend tells the story of a dragon that plagued the area where Klagenfurt was founded. To kill the dragon, the local duke built a tower and chained a bull to it. When the dragon came to feed on the bull, several knights surrounded and slew the dragon. The dragon and the tower thus became symbols of the city, and are also included on the coat of arms of Klagenfurt. However, the original coat of arms depicted another kind of mythical creature, which was reinterpreted as a dragon some centuries later.

The history of the monument goes back to the early 16th century. In 1514 the city was ravaged by a fire, and two years later a programme for rebuilding included plans for a public fountain, partially as a source of water to fight future city fires. In 1583 the demand for a public fountain in the main square of the city was repeated. Work seems to have started relatively soon afterwards: in 1590 work began on the sculpture of the dragon at the quarry site, and in 1593 it was completed and transported into the city, pulled on rollers by 300 festively dressed boys. Only 40 years later, however, was it hoisted onto its pedestal; at the same time, in 1636, the statue of Hercules (sometimes referred to as a "dragon slayer") was also erected and the monumental fountain completed.

The sculpture of the dragon is often attributed to sculptor Ulrich Vogelsang, who was active 1587–1606 and received several similar commissions to embellish e.g. the city gates, but the attribution remains uncertain. The attribution of the sculpture of Hercules to sculptor Michael Hönel is less controversial, as a receipt connecting Hönel with the commission has been preserved.

Restoration work was carried out in 1997, 2013 and 2017 on the lindworm. The wrought iron fence was repaired in 2022.

=== The Lindwurmbrunnen in the history of palaeontology ===
Closeup view of the dragon's head, possibly inspired by the skull of a woolly rhinoceros

The original woolly rhinoceros skull

Probably around 1335 the skull of a woolly rhinoceros (Coelodonta antiquitatis) was discovered in a gravel pit outside Klagenfurt. The skull was brought to the town hall and displayed there, believed to be the skull of a dragon or lindworm. In 1840, palaeontologist Franz Unger identified the skull as being that of a woolly rhinoceros. He proposed that the sculptor who made the sculpture of the dragon took inspiration from the skull displayed in the town hall. In 1914, palaeontologist Othenio Abel similarly assumed (but apparently independently of Unger) that the design of the dragon's head had been inspired by the skull.

The claim that the head of the dragon was inspired by the fossil skull has later frequently been repeated. Historian of science and folklore Adrienne Mayor states that the dragon statue "is often cited as the earliest reconstruction of an extinct animal". Palaeontologist Mark P. Witton confirms the overall picture that the "earliest confirmed efforts to depict the life appearance of fossil animals are those of 16th-century Europe", but is more reserved as to whether there was any direct link between the discovery of the skull and the design of the Klagenfurt sculpture. He points out that the dragon's head and the skull of the woolly rhinoceros are not extremely similar, and that "it may be that this fossil inspired ideas more than specific anatomies". He notes the similar proportions of the skull and the head of the statue. Spanish palaeontologists Xabier Pereda Suberbiola and Ignacio Díaz-Martínez are even more sceptical, pointing to the lack of concrete evidence of any artistic inspiration and quoting Michel Meurger in describing the supposed link between skull and sculpture as "forced euhemerism".

For several centuries after its discovery, the original woolly rhinoceros skull was kept at the town hall. In 1849 it became part of the collection of the State Museum for Carinthia in Klagenfurt.

== Sources cited ==
- Abel, Othenio (1914). Die Tiere der Vorwelt (in German). Berlin & Leipzig: B.G. Teubner.
- Buffetaut, Éric (1998). Histoire de la paléontologie (in French). Presses Universitaires de France.
- Mayor, Adrienne (2023) [2000]. The first fossil hunters. Princeton: Princeton University Press. ISBN 9780691245607.
- Pereda Suberbiola, Xabier; Díaz-Martínez, Ignacio (2011). "Los fósiles de dinosaurios como Geomitos". Enseñanza de las Ciencias de la Tierra. 19 (2). Enseñanza de las Ciencias de la Tierra: 141–148. ISSN 1132-9157.
- Puschnig, Roman (1935). "Der "Lindwurmschädel" von Klagenfurt" (PDF). Carinthia II. 125 (45). Naturwissenschaftlicher Verein für Kärnten: 65–85.
- Witton, Mark P. (2018). Palaeoartist's Handbook: Recreating prehistoric animals in art. Ramsbury: Crowood Press. ISBN 9781785004629.
