= Guivre =

Dragonlike mythical creature

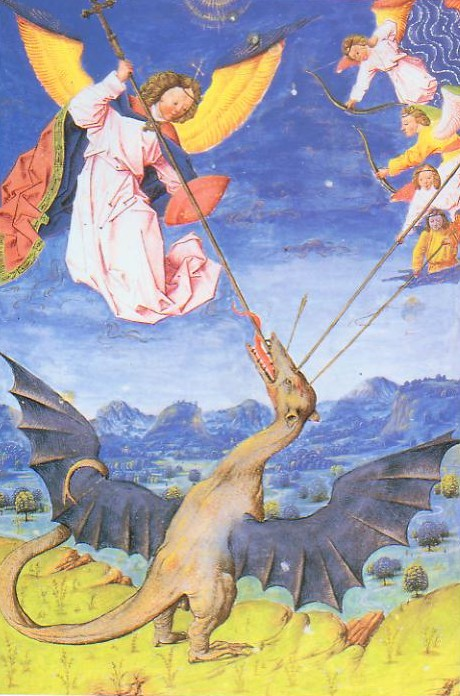
Vouivre. Liber Floridus, 1448.

Guivre (or givre) and vouivre are French names for a type of serpentine mythical creature, by extension a dragon, by some accords, equivalent to a lindworm or wyvern. The names can be used synonymously for the same creature, the former deriving from the latter, or refer to different but similar mythological creatures depending on the myth. In legend they are portrayed as serpentine creatures who possessed venomous breath and prowled the countryside of Medieval France.

== Etymology ==
The words "guivre" and "givre" are spelling variations of the more common word "vouivre". In Franc-Comtois, "vouivre", is the equivalent of the old French word "guivre." These forms ultimately derive from Latin: vīpera, meaning "viper" or venomous snake. This follows the common European tradition of deriving dragon myths, and thereof, from venomous serpents. Compare the Old Germanic word for dragon, worm, wyrm, wurm, and the root for the word "dragon", Ancient Greek: δράκων (drákōn), both meaning "serpent".

The English wyvern (a type of dragon) derives from Old French "vouivre".

== Guivre ==
Guivres (alternatively givres) were said to possess a long, serpentine body and a dragon's head. The hind feet are not as visible if present at all. The guivre had horns in its forehead in some accounts, as well. Locally in France, it was known as an extremely aggressive creature that would sometimes attack without being provoked. They were afraid of naked humans, and when saw them, blushed and looked away. Documentation points to their residence as being in small bodies of water like pools and lakes, forests, and any damp place.

Samson of Dol was present at an encounter between a small dragon-like creature, known as La Guivre ("the guivre"), and a priest. Samson had come to visit Saint Suliao with an entourage of followers. Suliao was impoverished but sought to provide a meal as best as possible for the group. One priest, uneasy with the low quality of food, took a bread roll and hid it under his robe. Almost instantaneously he started convulsing and Suliao pulled apart his bosom, seeing what the man had done. He admonished the priest and removed a hideous serpentine creature from the robe. There, he exorcised it and then compelled another man to throw it from the roof of a building in Garot.

== Vouivre ==
Guivres are also well known as vouivres, and the terms are historically related and synonymous, however, they can refer to different mythological creatures. For example, in The Drac: French Tales of Dragons and Demons, the vouivre is depicted as a female creature with dazzling, green scales which emanate sound as the vouivre flies. The vouivre is depicted as greedy, her head crowned with pearls and a golden ring about her tail. The beast in this story stayed in a cave for most of her time, then left to bathe only for a few minutes (compare Fáfnir of Germanic legend).

According to the Contes et légendes de Franche-Comté ("Tales and legends of Franche-Comté"), the Vouivre is a unique gigantic snake like dragon, wearing a ruby on its forehead, and using it as its eye.

== Literary use ==
In Steve Alten's The Loch the Loch Ness Monster is originally thought to be a guivre which got into Loch Ness through Moray Firth. The guivres were said to be a species of giant eel, a predecessor to the Anguilla. In the 1989 film La Vouivre, the vouivre was a wood nymph.

== See also ==
- Biscione

== Bibliography ==
- Shuker, Karl (2003). Dragons: A Natural History. New York: Barnes & Noble Books. ISBN 978-0-7607-4551-9.
- Rose, Carol. Giants, Monsters, and Dragons. W. W. Norton & Company.
- Dickens, Charles (1864). "(unspecified)". All the Year Round. X (227–250). Oxford University.
