= Flying serpent =

Flying serpent may refer to:

- Fiery flying serpent, a creature mentioned in the Hebrew Bible
- Flying serpent (asterism), an asterism in the Chinese constellation Encampment
- Chrysopelea, commonly known as the flying snake, a genus of snakes
- The Flying Serpent, a 1946 American film

== See also ==
- Winged serpent (disambiguation)
