= Wyvern =

Legendary bipedal creature

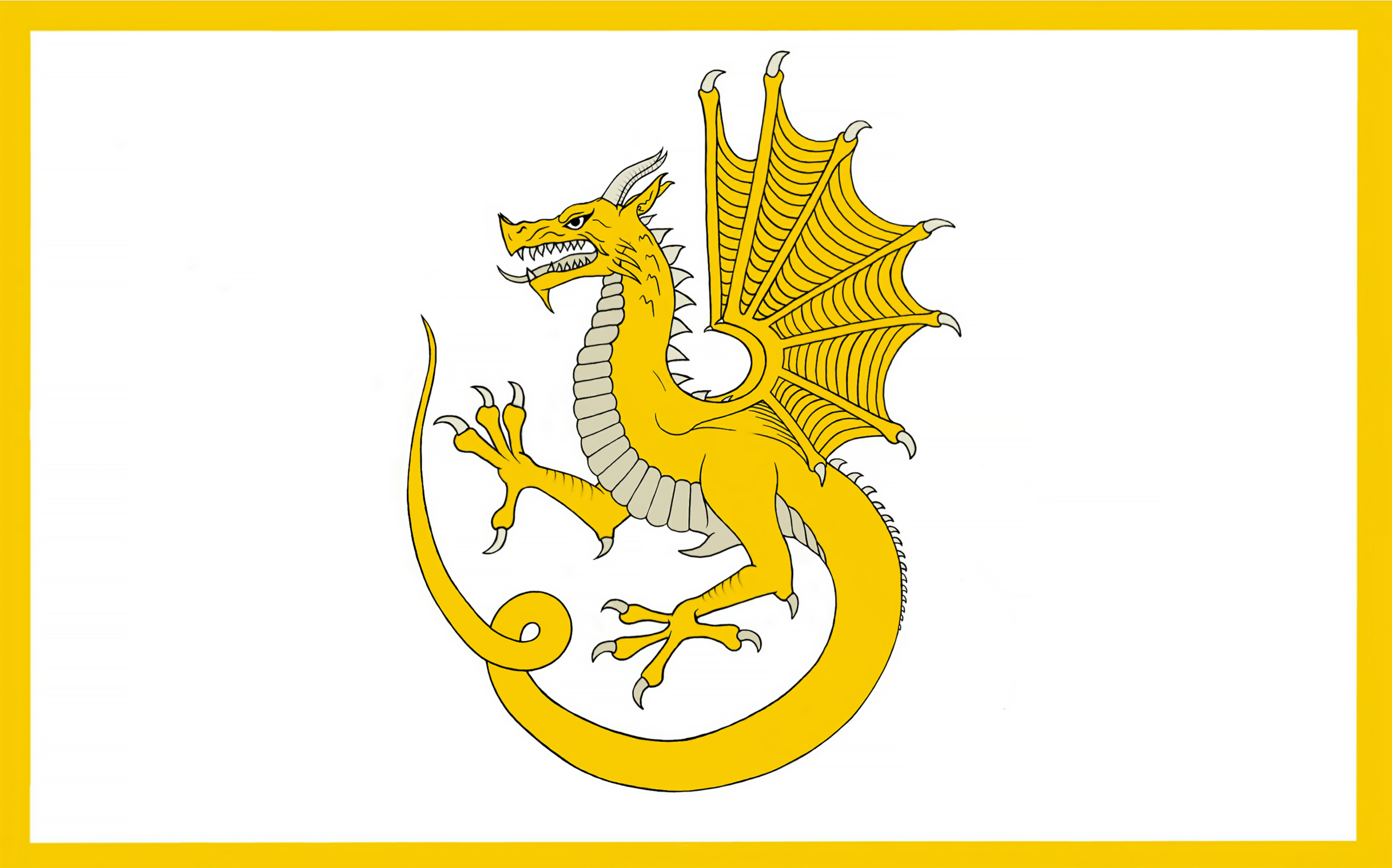
Y Ddraig Aur, artist's interpretation of a flag that was carried by Owain Glyndŵr at the Battle of Tuthill. The interpretation as a wyvern is based on his privy seal.

Wessex is often, in modern times, symbolised by a wyvern or dragon. While there is little to no evidence that it explicitly identified Wessex at the time of the kingdom, the association was popularised in the 19th century. The above flag was created by William Crampton, an advocate for English regional flags, in 1974.

The wyvern (/ˈwaɪvərn/ WY-vərn), sometimes spelled wivern (/ˈwɪvərn/ WIV-ərn), is a type of mythical dragon with two legs, two wings, and often a pointed tail.

The wyvern in its various forms is important in heraldry, frequently appearing as a mascot of schools and athletic teams (chiefly in the United States, United Kingdom, and Canada). It is a popular creature in European literature, mythology, and folklore. Today, it is often used in fantasy literature and video games. The wyvern in heraldry and folklore is rarely fire-breathing, unlike other dragons.

== Etymology ==
According to the Oxford English Dictionary, the word is a development of Middle English wyver (attested fourteenth century), from Anglo-French wivre (compare French: vouivre and guivre), which originate from Latin: vīpera, meaning "viper", "adder", or "asp". This coincides with earlier Germanic tradition, where dragons are portrayed as large venomous serpents, and so often called "worms" (compare Old English: wyrm, Middle Low German: worm, Middle High German: wurm). The wyvern is thus directly related to the French vouivre and guivre, then by extension, also, the Central European lindworm.

The concluding "–n" had been added by the beginning of the 17th century, when John Guillim in 1610 describes the "wiverne" as a creature that "partake[s] of a Fowle in the Wings and Legs ... and doth resemble a Serpent in the Taile". John Gibbon in 1682 emphasises that it "hath but two Legs".

Conversely, medievalist William Sayers proposes a more complex origin for the term. He notes that the Anglo-French guivre and its Middle English derivative ceased to retain the original sense of "venomous snake" after the Latin term was re-introduced into medieval Latin, freeing them up to take an alternative meaning. He offered another meaning of wiver, this time Old English and guivre, "light javelin". By noting physical resemblances between the javelins and snakes, he proposed that the images of "venomous snake" and "light javelin" were melded to produce the novel concept of a flying snake.

== History ==
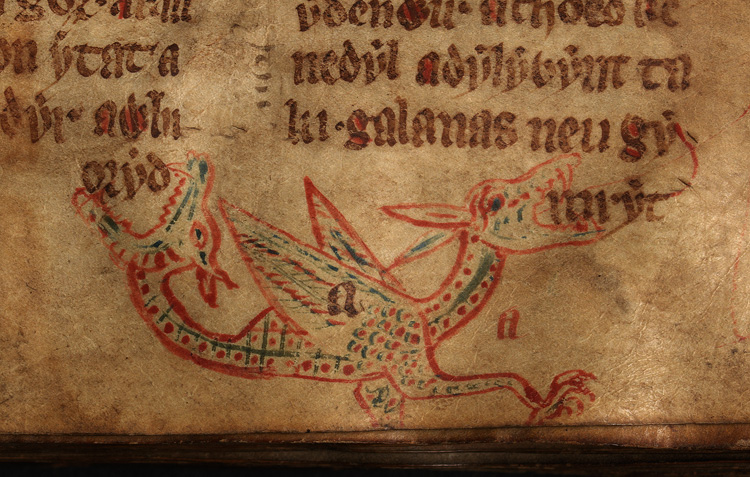
A wyvern from a fourteenth-century manuscript in the National Library of Wales, Aberystwyth: this example has a second head at the end of its tail.

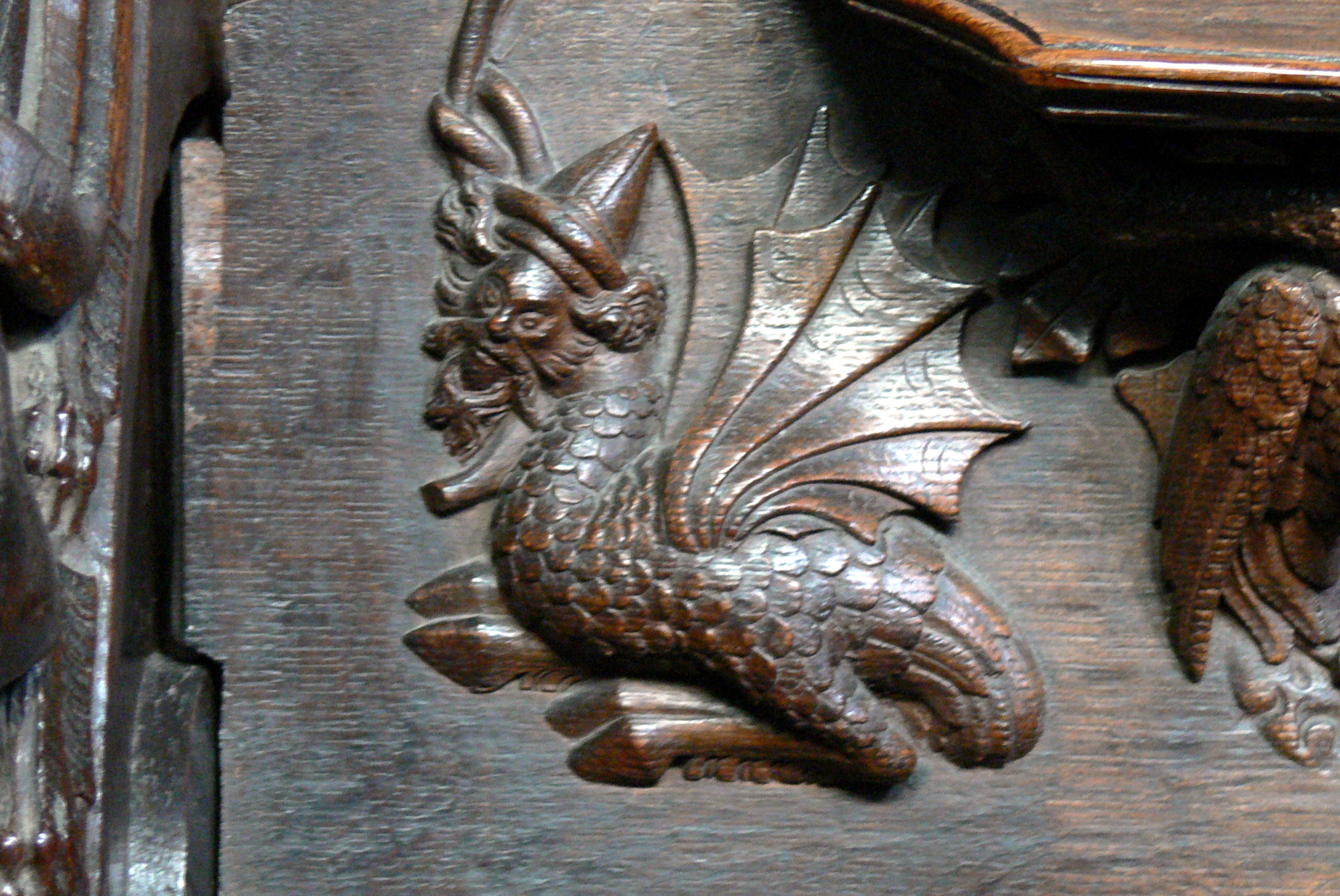
A carved wyvern on the choir stalls of Chester Cathedral in Cheshire, England, c. 1380

The concept of winged snakes as mythological creatures appears across numerous ancient Mediterranean and Near Eastern cultures, representing a widespread archetypal form that would later influence the development of the wyvern in European tradition. The Egyptian goddess Wadjet, depicted as a winged cobra or uraeus, exemplifies this tradition and served as a protective deity of Lower Egypt from the Predynastic period onwards. Similar winged serpentine creatures appear in Mesopotamian iconography, particularly in Neo-Assyrian palace reliefs from the 9th-7th centuries BCE, where they function as apotropaic guardians.

The earliest Greek literary reference to creatures explicitly described as "winged serpents" and "winged dragons" (πτερωτῶν ὀφίων and πτηνοὶ δράκοντες) appears in Herodotus' Histories where they come from Arabia to Egypt in spring but are stopped and killed by ibises (sacred Egyptian birds) waiting for them at the pass. Similarly, Euripides' Medea (431 BCE), where they are identified as the chariot steeds of Helios that transport Medea from Corinth. This motif was subsequently adopted by Roman authors, with Ovid's Metamorphoses (8 CE) providing an expanded description of these serpentine creatures possessing both wings and fiery breath. The conflation of serpentine and draconic features in classical literature established a precedent for the morphological ambiguity that would characterize medieval depictions of such creatures.

In medieval British heraldry, the earliest documented use of "wyver" appears in The Great, Parliamentary, or Banneret's Roll of 1312. The term derives from the Anglo-Norman wivre and Old French guivre "poisonous snake", both ultimately descended from the Latin vipera (viper), indicating the creature's fundamentally serpentine nature. Throughout the 14th and 15th centuries, heraldic texts demonstrate considerable terminological fluidity, with "dragon," "wyrm," and "wyver" often used interchangeably for two-legged winged serpents. The taxonomic distinction between four-legged dragons and two-legged wyverns emerged gradually during the late medieval period, becoming codified in English heraldry during the 16th century. This distinction was further elaborated in subsequent heraldic manuals, including Gerard Legh's The Accedens of Armory (1562) and John Guillim's influential Display of Heraldrie (1610), which established the iconographic conventions that would persist in British heraldry.

== Distinction from other dragons ==
Since the sixteenth century, in English, Welsh, Scottish, French and Irish heraldry, heraldic wyverns are defined as distinct entities from heraldic dragons. The key difference has been that a wyvern has two legs, whereas a dragon has four. This distinction is not commonly observed in the heraldry of other European countries, where two-legged dragon creatures are simply called dragons.

== In modern fiction ==
The wyvern frequently features in modern fantasy fiction, such as Fourth Wing, Throne of Glass, and The Black Witch Chronicles, though its first literary appearances may have been in medieval bestiaries.

Wyverns appear in the video games Ark: Survival Evolved and Ark: Survival Ascended on the Downloadable Content maps Scorched Earth and Ragnarok.

Monsters referred to as wyverns appear throughout the Monster Hunter video game franchise, though only a few of them closely resemble typical depictions of wyverns.

Wyverns also appear in the Terraria video game. The player can only find them at high altitudes and they resemble traditional Chinese dragons in appearance.

== In heraldry ==
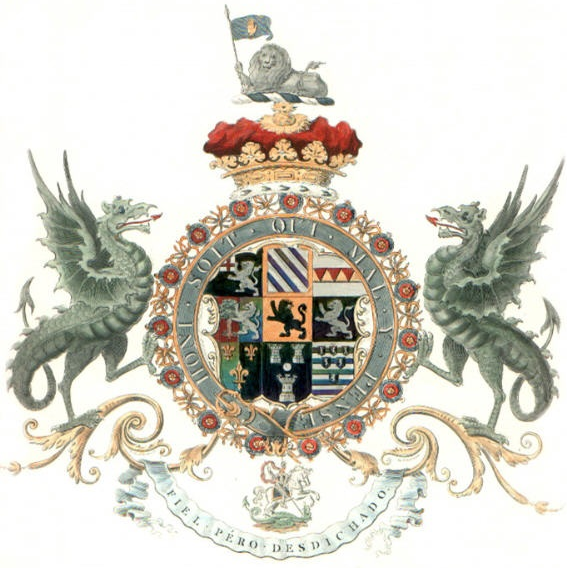
Wyverns supporting the arms of John Churchill, 1st Duke of Marlborough

The wyvern is a frequent charge in English heraldry and vexillology, also occasionally appearing as a supporter or crest. In the context of British heraldry, the four-legged dragon and the two-legged wyvern are considered to be two strictly different entities. This distinction is not typically made in French or German heraldry.

A wyvern is typically depicted resting upon its legs and tail, but may be depicted with its claws in the air and only supported by its tail. On occasion, a wyvern may be depicted as wingless and with its tail nowed. A wingless heraldic wyvern is typically referred to as either a wyvern sans wings or as a lindworm. Legless wyverns, termed sans legs, are also used in some charges.

A silver (argent) wyvern formed the crest of the Borough of Leicester as recorded at the heraldic visitation of Leicestershire in 1619: "A wyvern sans legs argent strewed with wounds gules, wings expanded ermine." The term "sans legs" may not imply that the wyvern was "without legs", rather than its legs are not depicted, being hidden or folded under. This was adopted by the Midland Railway in 1845 when it became the crest of its unofficial coat of arms. The company asserted that the "wyvern was the standard of the Kingdom of Mercia", and that it was "a quartering in the town arms of Leicester". However, in 1897 the Railway Magazine noted that there appeared "to be no foundation that the wyvern was associated with the Kingdom of Mercia". It has been associated with Leicester since the time of Thomas, 2nd Earl of Lancaster and Leicester (c. 1278–1322), the most powerful lord in the Midlands, who used it as his personal crest.

The arms of the Worshipful Society of Apothecaries depict a wyvern, symbolising disease, being overcome by Apollo, symbolising medicine.

A green wyvern stands in the emblem of the ancient Umbrian city of Terni; the dragon is called by the name Thyrus by the citizens. A sable wyvern on a white background with endorsed wings forms the coat of arms of the Tilley family.

The royal arms of Portugal use two wyverns holding banners as supporters, with a further demi-wyvern as a crest.

Wyvern Zilant is depicted on the coat of arms of the city of Kazan, the capital of the Republic of Tatarstan.

== As a logo or mascot ==
The wyvern is a popular commercial logo or mascot, especially in Wales and what was once the West Country Kingdom of Wessex, but also in Herefordshire and Worcestershire, as the rivers Wye and Severn run through Hereford and Worcester respectively. A local radio station was formerly called Wyvern FM. Vauxhall Motors had a model in its range in the 1950s called the Wyvern. The Westland Wyvern was a British single-seat carrier-based multi-role strike aircraft built by Westland Aircraft that served in the 1950s, seeing active service in the 1956 Suez Crisis.

- The wyvern is a frequent mascot of athletic teams, colleges and universities, particularly in the United Kingdom and the United States, and was the mascot of the former Korea Baseball Organization team SK Wyverns, established in 2000, King's College, within the University of Queensland, and the Japanese basketball team, the Passlab Yamagata Wyverns of the Japanese B.League.
- The wyvern is also the mascot of the 51st Operations Support Squadron at Osan Air Base, with the motto: "breathin' fire!"
- A wyvern is depicted on the unit crest of the USAF 31st Fighter Wing.
- A wyvern is featured on the club crests of both Leyton Orient F.C. and Carlisle United F.C.
- A wyvern is featured as the team mascot for Woodbridge College in Woodbridge, Ontario, Canada.
- A wyvern is the mascot of Quinsigamond Community College in Worcester, Massachusetts.
- A wyvern is the logo of LLVM, the compiler infrastructure project.
- A wyvern is the logo of the Swiss chocolate manufacturer Lindt.
- A wyvern is the emblem of East London Rugby Football Club.
- Wyvern is the a nickname of a fictional aircraft in the Ace Combat series: the X-02 Wyvern.
- A wyvern is the emblem of Old Wesley R.F.C.
- A wyvern is contained in the emblem of Ternana Calcio.
- A wyvern is featured on the crest of King Alfred School, Plön.
- The Wessex Ridgeway trail, which runs across the modern-day counties of Wiltshire and Dorset, uses a wyvern as the waymarking symbol.

== Examples ==
Arms of Sophie, Duchess of Edinburgh

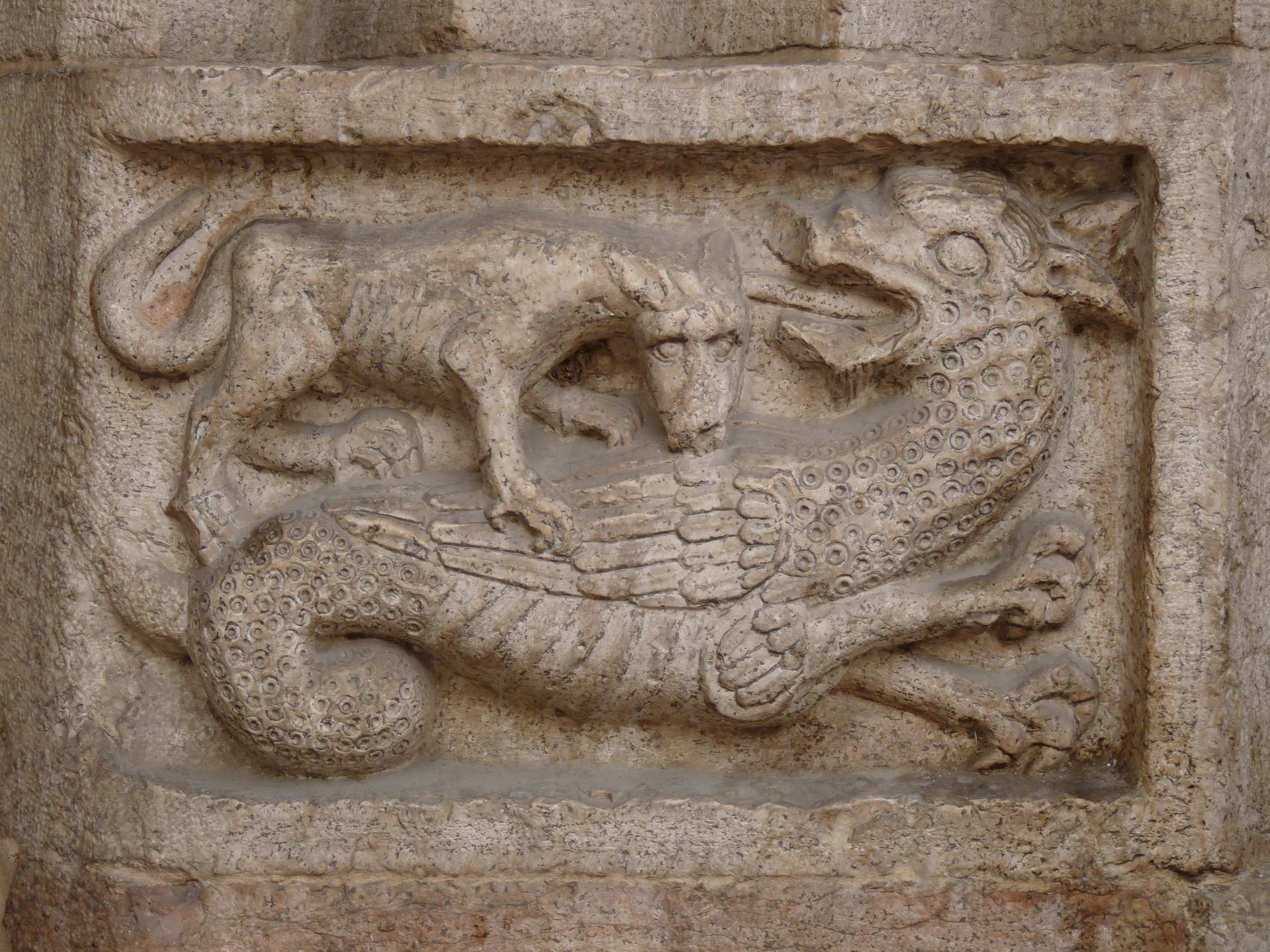
A wyvern fighting with a wolf, relief, Trento Cathedral, Italy

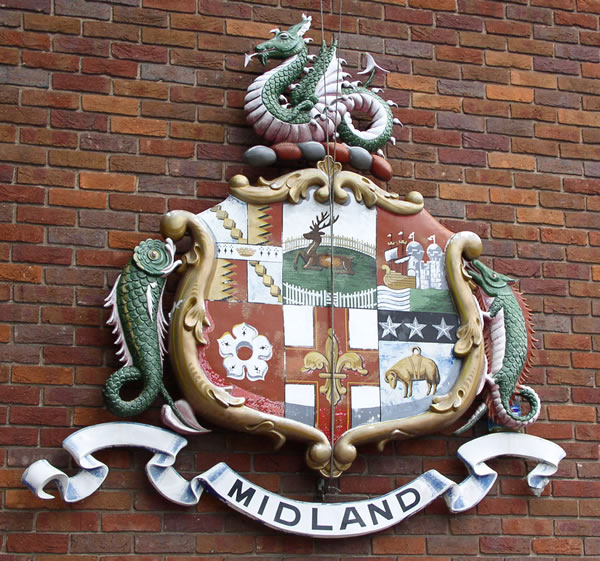
Arms of Midland Railway at Derby station, bearing in crest a wyvern sans legs

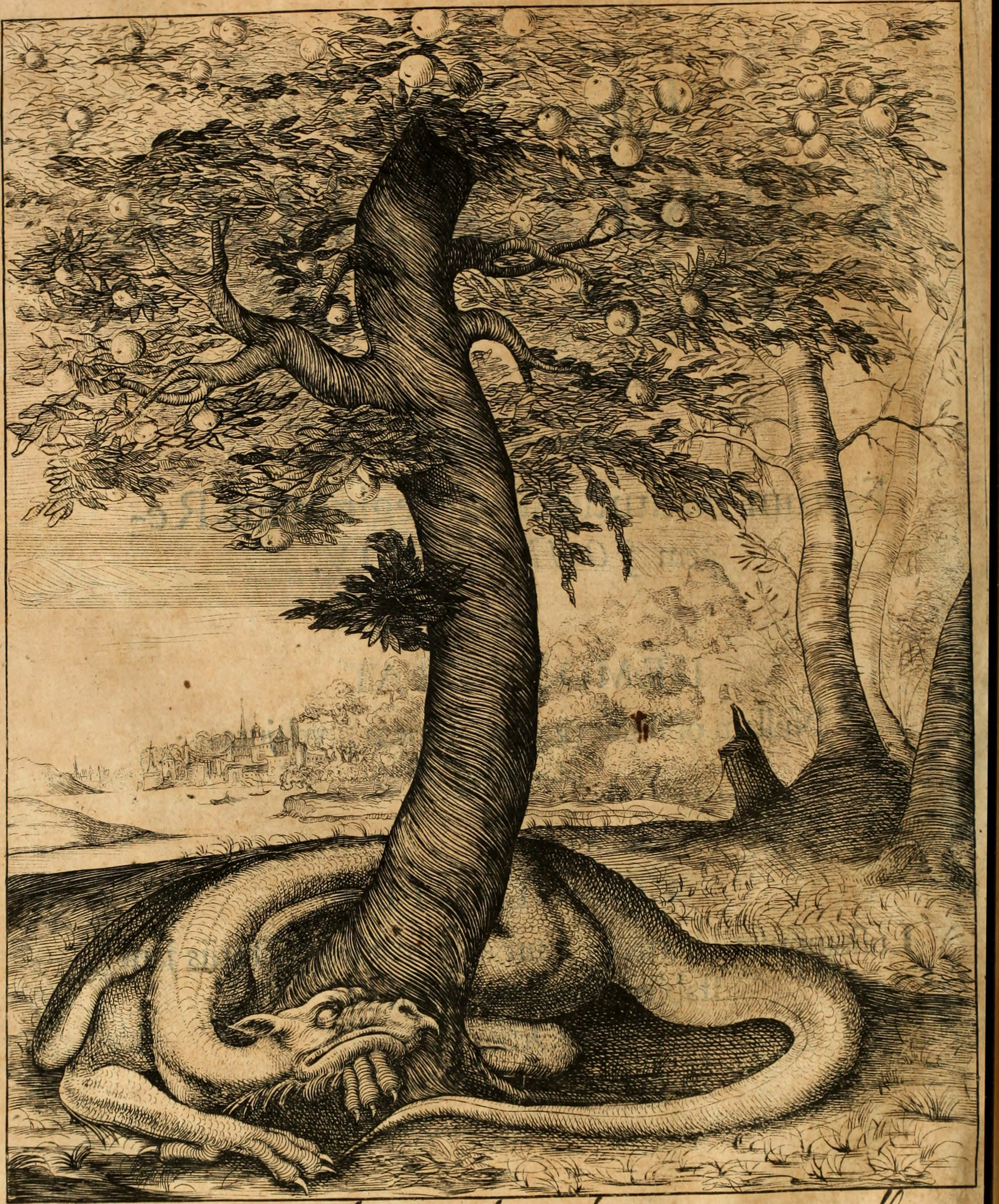
Wyvern as a personification of Portugal

43rd (Wessex) Infantry Division insignia (World War II)

US Army 3rd Infantry Division has a wyvern on its emblem. The insignia is worn as a unit badge by members of the division's command.

The flag of the former Duchy of Masovia

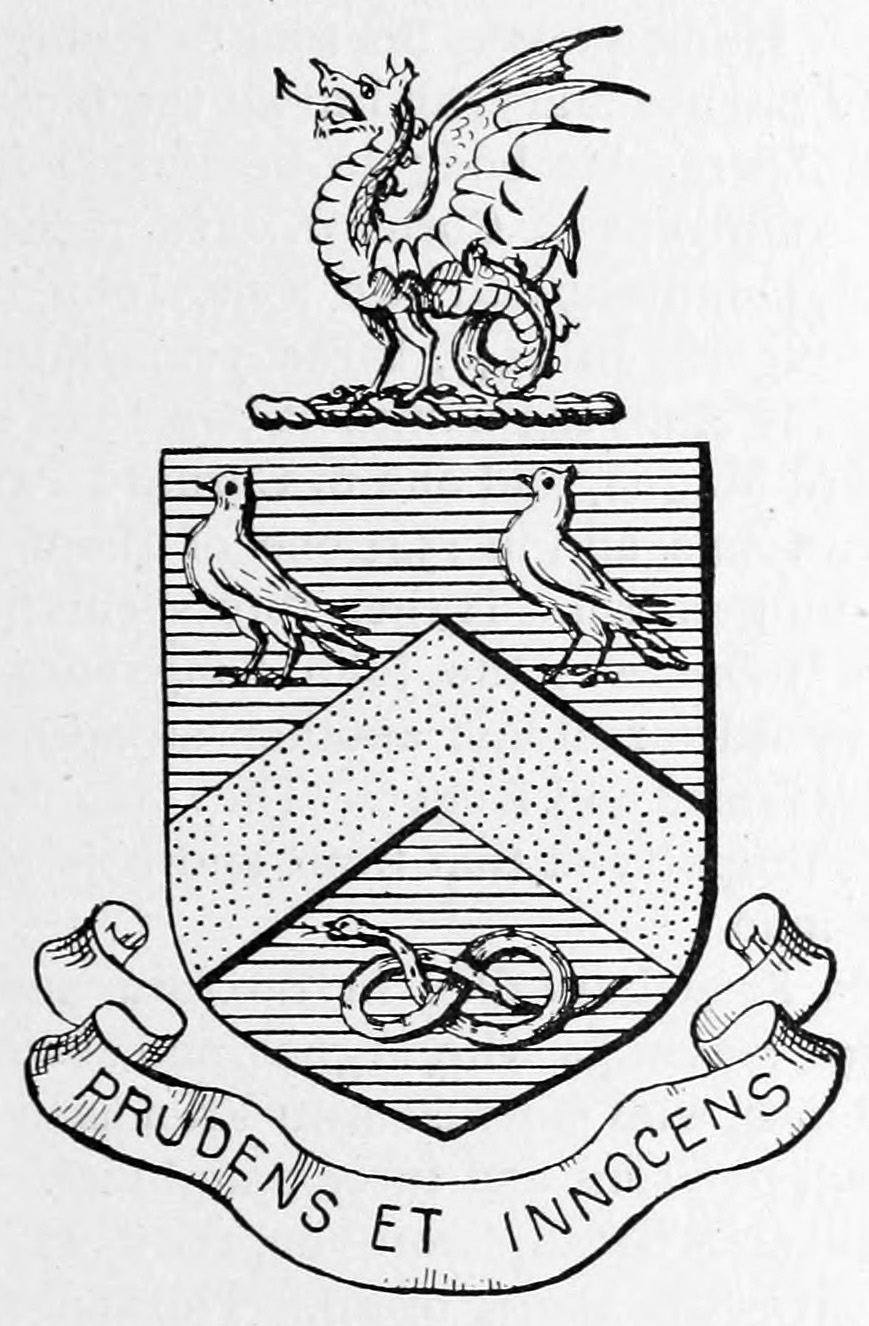
Wyvern atop the crest of Dr. Thomas Kingsbury, Fellow of the King and Queen's College of Physicians, Ireland (1742).

Flag of Trégor, Brittany

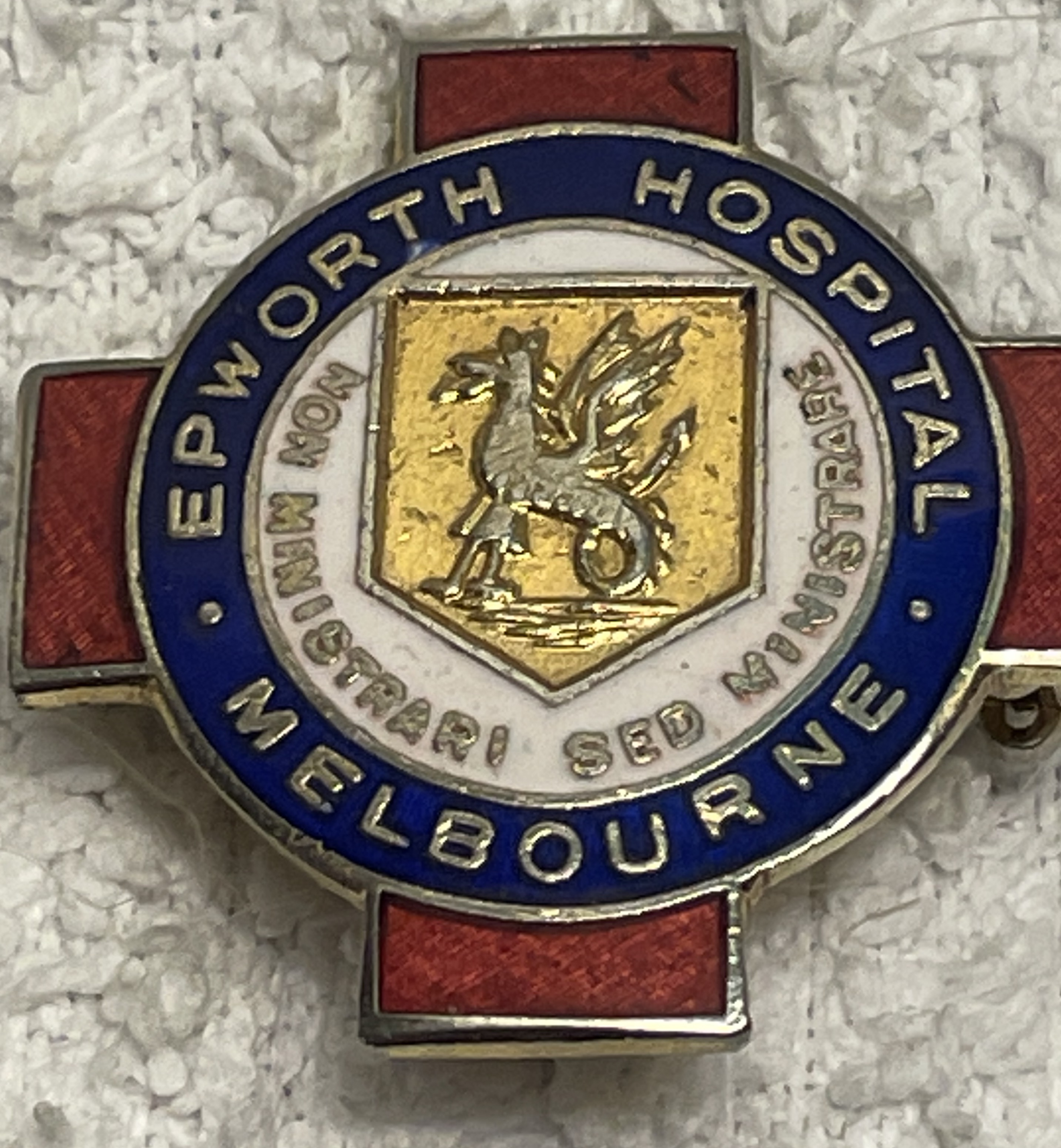
General Nursing Badge awarded to graduates of the Epworth Hospital General Nursing School (1924–1988). This particular design features a wyvern and the motto Non ministrari sed ministrare (not to be served but to serve). The design was adopted for use by nursing training schools established by the Methodist Church in Adelaide (Memorial Hospital) and Sydney (Waverly War Memorial Hospital).

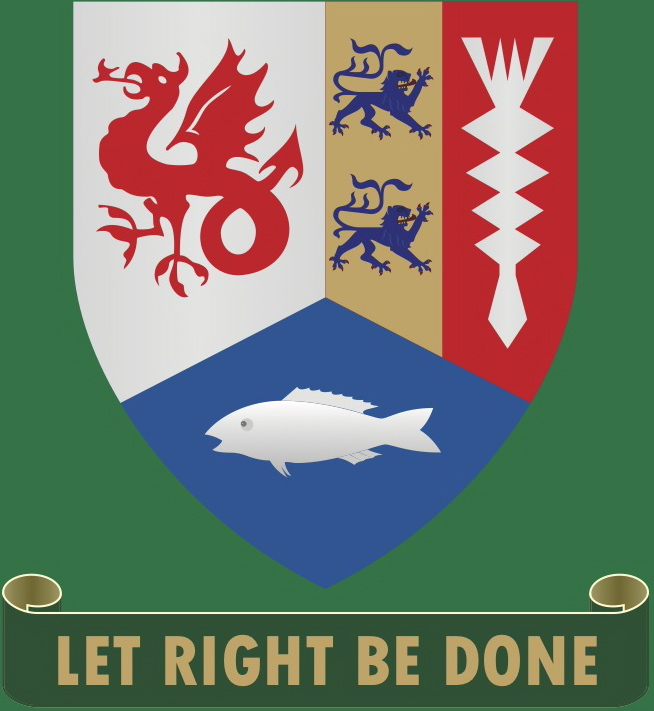
Crest of King Alfred School, Plön

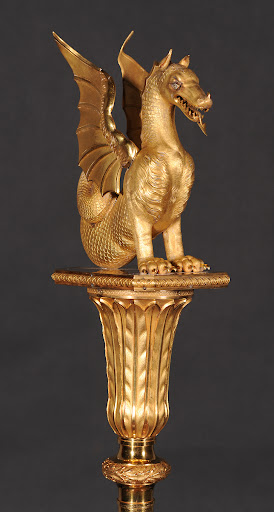
The Imperial Sceptre of Brazil. The wyvern is the traditional symbol and crest of the House of Braganza

A proposed flag for Cumbria, England, which was one of the finalists in the 2025 competition to create an official community flag for the region

== See also ==
- Basilisk
- Cockatrice
- Cuélebre
- European dragon
- Lindworm
- White dragon
