= Lindworm =

Dragon or serpent monster in Nordic mythology

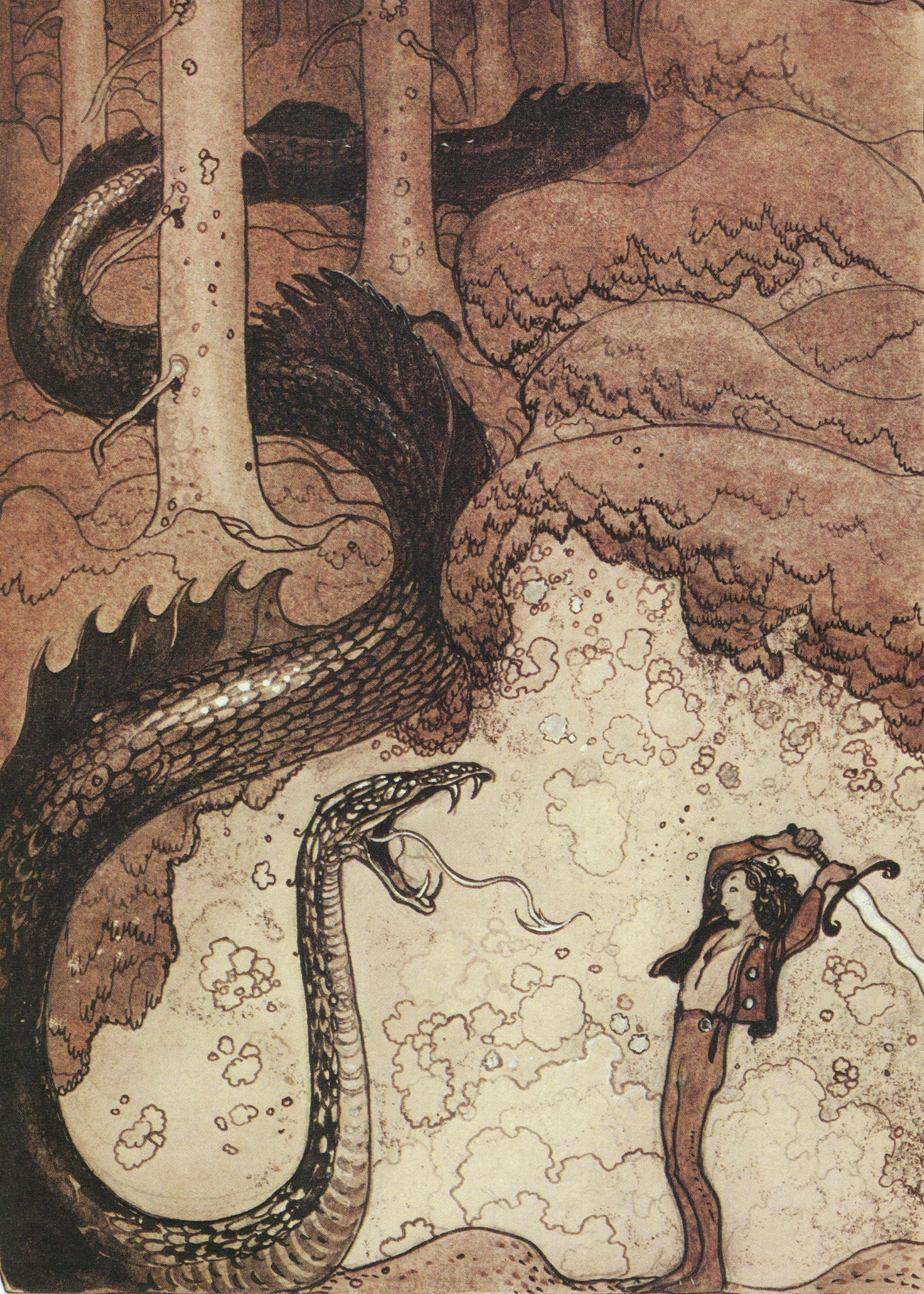
- Swedish lindworm drawn by Swedish illustrator John Bauer, 1911. The Swedish lindworm lacks wings and limbs.

Creature information
- Other name(s): Lindwurm, lindwyrm, lindorm
- Grouping: Monster
- Sub grouping: Dragon
- Family: Worm (dragon), Whiteworm (mythology), Basilisk, Guivre, Vouivre, Wyvern, Sea serpents, Jörmungandr
- Folklore: Mythical creature, legendary creature

Origin
- First attested: Viking Age
- Region: Northern Europe, Western Europe, Central Europe

The lindworm (worm meaning snake), also spelled lindwyrm or lindwurm, is a mythical creature in Northern, Western and Central European folklore that traditionally has the shape of a giant serpent monster which lives deep in the forest. It can be seen as a sort of dragon.

In Central Europe and beyond, it is often depicted as a serpent with forelimbs, often also with wings and sometimes even hindlimbs, but in some traditions, especially Swedish folklore, it is foremost limbless; however, the various traits are generally just considered variation within the "species", and a lindworm is not defined by limbs or lack thereof. A broad definition is any western dragon with heavy serpentine features.

According to legend, everything that lies under a lindworm will increase as the lindworm grows. This belief gave rise to tales of dragons that brood over treasures to become richer. Legend tells of two kinds of lindworm: a good one, associated with luck, often a cursed prince who has been transformed into the beast (compare to "The Frog Prince" and "Beauty and the Beast" stories), and a bad one, a dangerous man-eater that will attack humans on sight. A lindworm may swallow its own tail, turning itself into a rolling wheel, to pursue fleeing humans (compare ouroboros and hoop snake).

The head of the 16th-century lindworm statue at Lindwurm Fountain (Lindwurmbrunnen) in Klagenfurt, Austria, is speculated to have been modeled on the skull of a woolly rhinoceros found in a nearby quarry in 1335. It has been cited as the earliest reconstruction of an extinct animal.

== Etymology ==
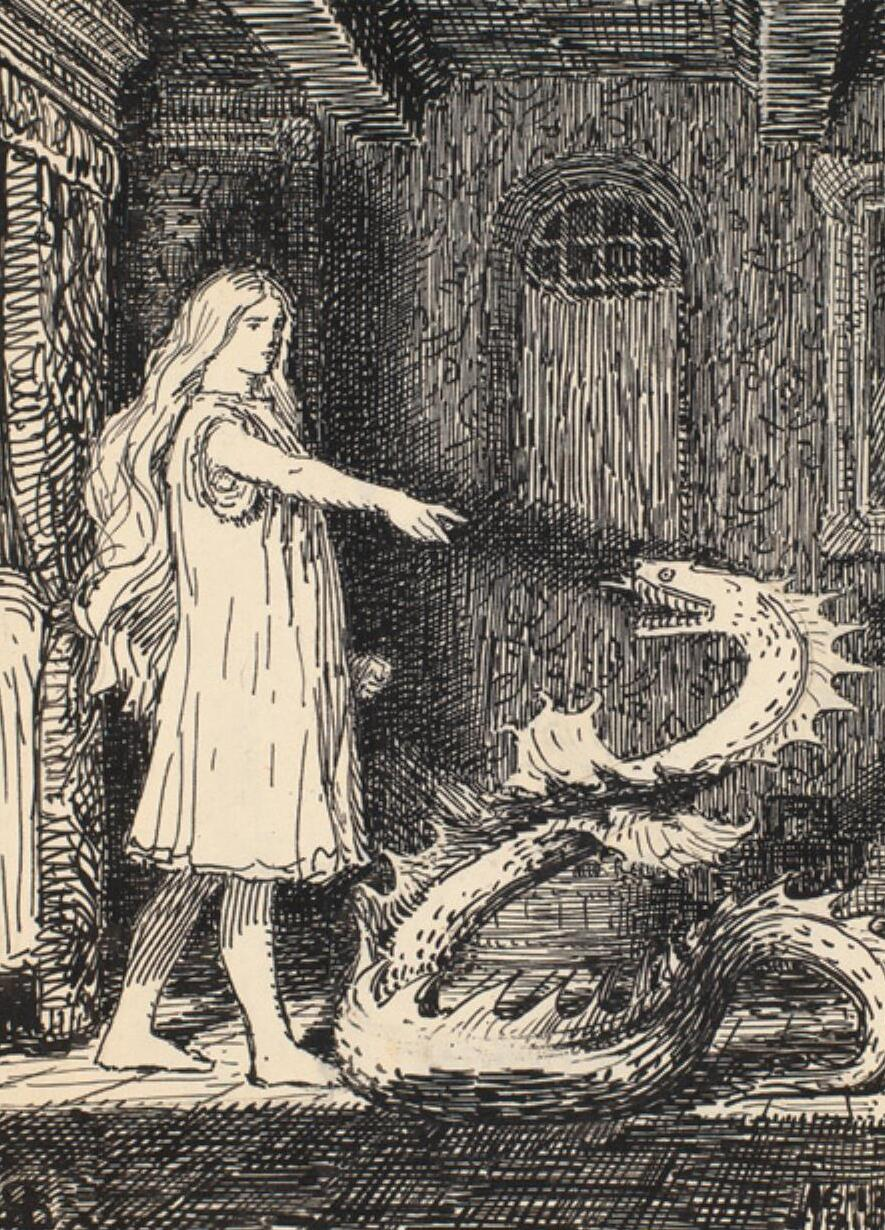
King Lindworm according to Danish painter Niels Skovgaard (1910)

Lindworm derives from early medieval Germanic languages, according to the Oxford English Dictionary, first appearing in English as lintworm in 1423. The name compounds Germanic lind with worm, the latter meaning "snake, dragon"; however, the earliest known form of the word is Middle High German: lintrache ('lin-dragon'), found in Nibelungenlied, only later appearing as lintwurm, Middle Low German: lintworm, lindworm, Middle Dutch: lindeworm, Old Norse: linnormr, Old Swedish: lindormber. The actual origin is uncertain, possibly from a Proto-Germanic form akin to *linþawurmiz.

The meaning of the prefix lind is uncertain, perhaps it is from the Proto-Germanic adjective *linþia-, meaning "flexible", or perhaps it is from the Old Danish/Old Saxon lithi, Old High German lindi, "soft, mild" (Middle High and Low German linde, German lind, (ge)linde), Old English liðe (English lithe, "agile"), alternatively something akin to Old Swedish linde (modern Swedish linda), existing as prefix lind- and linn-, meaning "to wind", "to turn coils around something". In Old Icelandic, the term linnormr was used to translate German sources to produce Þiðreks saga (an Old Norse chivalric saga adapted from the continent from the late 13th century).

== Swedish lindworm (lindorm) ==
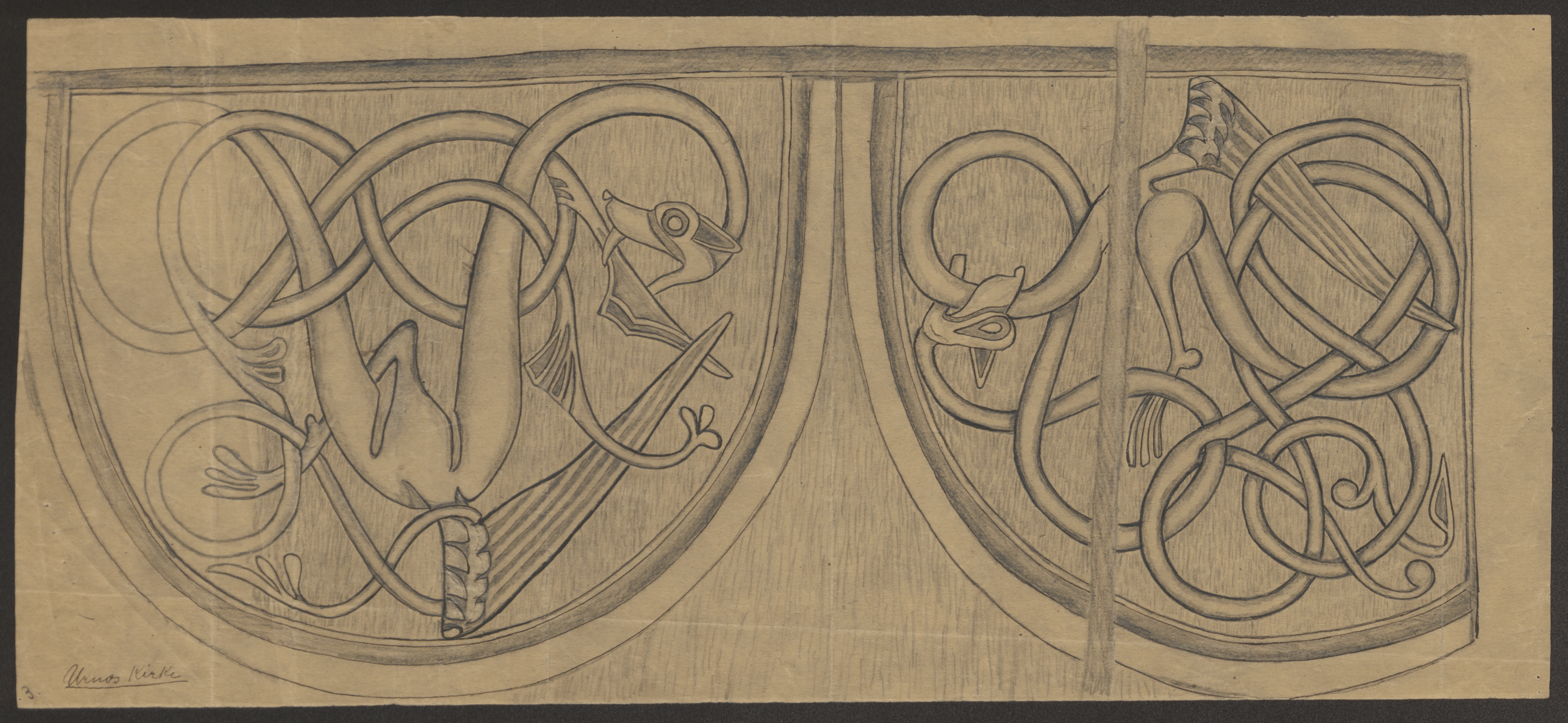
In comparison to Sweden, which largely kept the serpentine origin of the lindworm, Early Medieval carvings of Lindworms at Urnes Stave Church in Norway show winged bipedal chimera designs more in line with Central European lindworms and conventional dragons.

In Nordic folklore, specifically Swedish folklore, lindworms traditionally appear as giant forest serpents without limbs, living between rocks deep in the forest. They are said to be dark in color with a brighter underside. Along the spine, they are said to have either fish-like dorsal fins or a horse-like mane; for this reason, they are sometimes called a "mane snake" (Swedish: manorm). For defence and attack, lindworms can spit a foul milk-like substance that can blind enemies.

Lindworm eggs are said to be laid under the bark of linden trees (Swedish: lind). Once hatched, lindworms slither away and make a home in a pile of rocks. When fully grown, they can become extremely long. To counter this, during hunting they swallow their own tails to become a wheel and roll at extremely high speeds to pursue prey. This practice earned them the nickname "wheel snake" (Swedish: hjulorm).

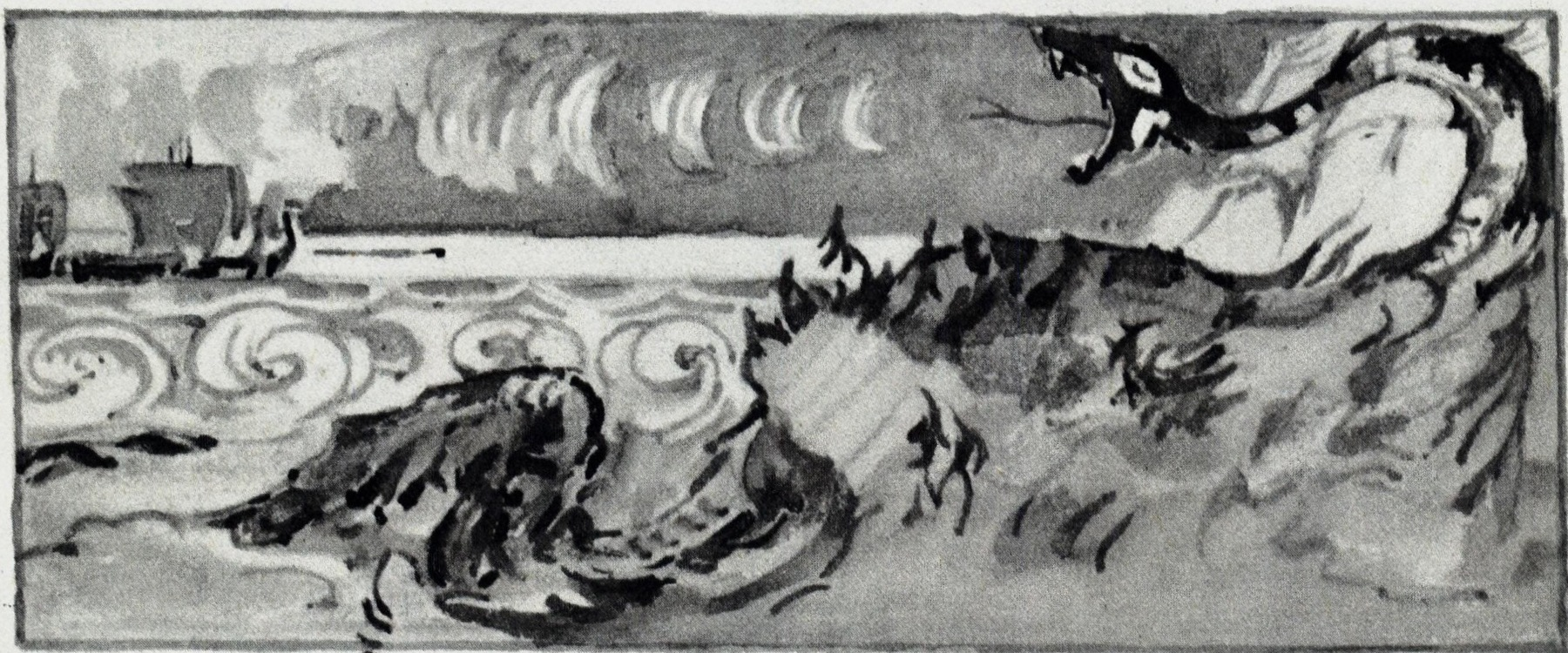
Serpentine lindworm by Norwegian artist Gerhard Munthe (1943)

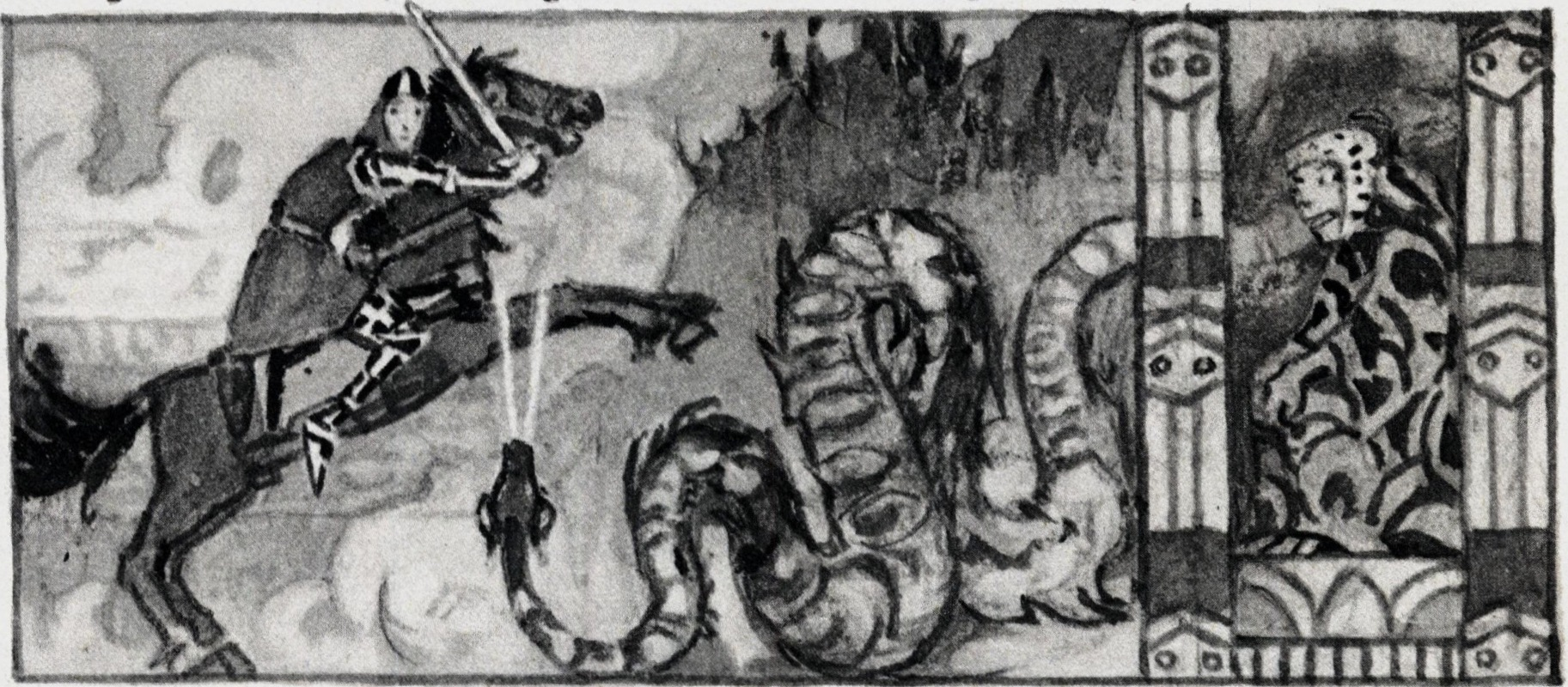
Serpentine lindworm by Norwegian artist Gerhard Munthe (1943)

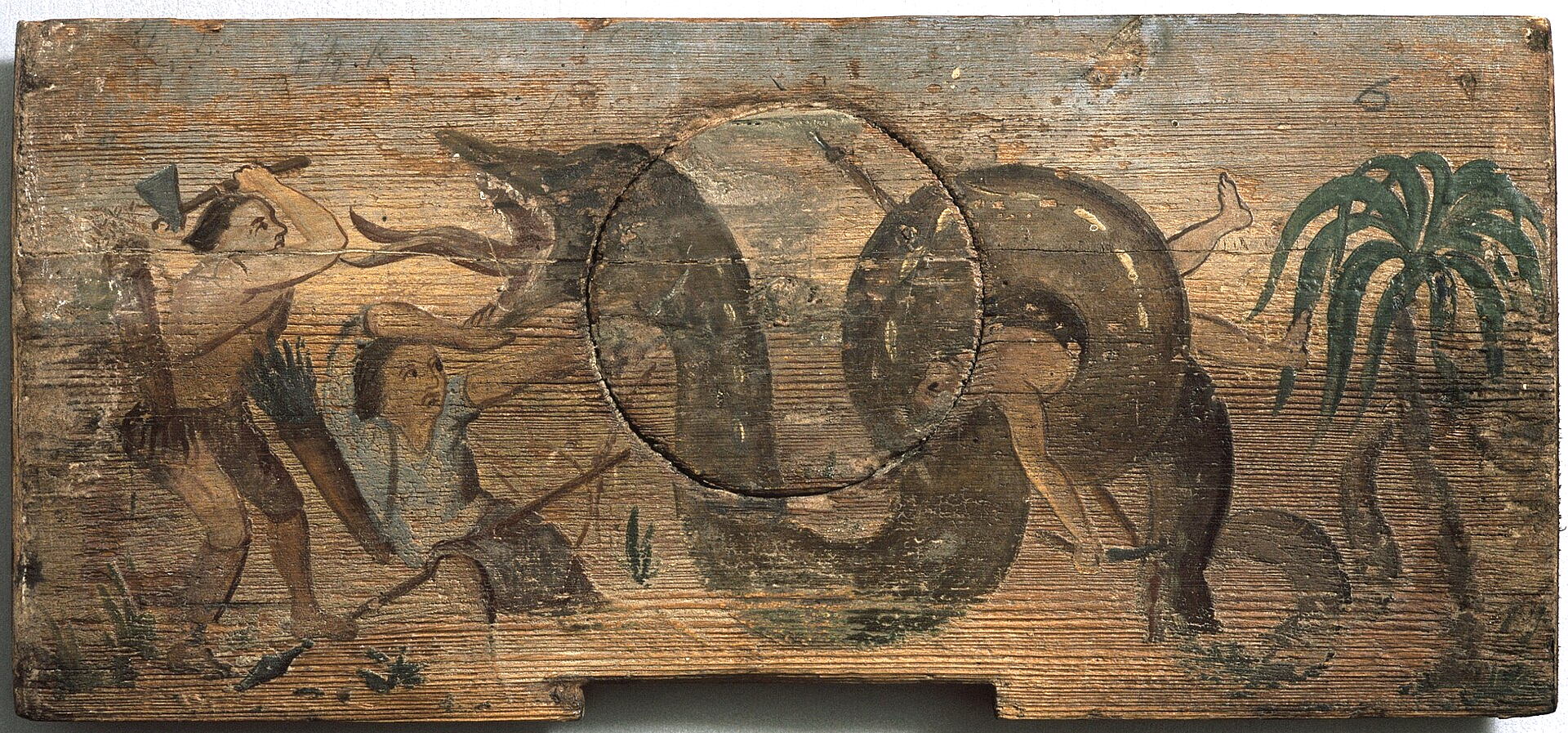
Slovenian serpent dragon, comparable to the Swedish lindworm

=== Brooding over treasure ===
In Nordic folklore, it is said 'that which lies under a lindworm will grow at the rate of the snake'. This ability stems from pagan times and is featured in many of the old sagas involving Germanic dragons and serpents. One of the most stereotypical uses for this trait is to brood over treasure in order to get richer.

Here follows a revolving quote from Fru Marie Grubbe, by Danish author Jens Peter Jacobsen (1876), given in its Swedish (1888), and English (1917), translation, due to availability. Of note: the book does not cover mythology, rather, the segment is spontaneous and written like something commonplace for the reader, used as a parable in an otherwise unrelated story. The English translation, while fairly direct, does not use the word lindworm (Swedish: lindorm), instead opting to translate it as serpent and reptile.

Swedish

Men det skedde icke, och han kunde icke låta bli att tänka sig, att dessa outtalade förebråelser nu lågo som lindormar ligga i sina mörka hålor, rufvande öfver dystra skatter, som växte allt efter som ormarna växte, blodröd karbunkel, lyftande sig fram på guldröd stjelk, och blek opal, långsamt utvidgande sig i knöl på knöl, svällande och ynglande, under det ormarnas kroppar, stilla, men ohejdadt växande, gledo ut i bugt på bugt, lyftande sig i ring på ring öfver skattens frodiga hvimmel.

English

Still it was not done, and he could not rid himself of a sense that these unspoken accusations lay like serpents in a dark cave (Swedish: like lindworms laying in their dark dens), brooding over sinister treasures, which grew as the reptiles grew, blood-red carbuncles rising on stalks of cadmium, and pale opal in bulb upon bulb slowly spreading, swelling, and breeding, while the serpents lay still but ceaselessly expanding, gliding forth in sinuous bend upon bend, lifting ring upon ring over the rank growth of the treasure.

=== Late belief in lindworms in Sweden ===
A belief in the reality of the lindorm, a giant limbless serpent, persisted well into the 19th century in some parts. In the mid-19th century, the Swedish folklorist Gunnar Olof Hyltén-Cavallius (1818–1889) collected stories of legendary creatures in Sweden and met several people in Småland, Sweden, who said they had encountered giant snakes, sometimes with a long mane. He gathered around 50 eyewitness reports and in 1884 offered a cash reward for a captured specimen, dead or alive. He was ridiculed by Swedish scholars, and because no one ever claimed the reward, the effort resulted in a cryptozoological defeat. Rumours of the existence of lindworms in Småland soon abated.

== Central European lindworm (lindwurm) ==
In Central Europe the lindworm usually resembles a dragon or something similar. It generally appears with a scaly serpentine body, a dragon's head, and two clawed forelimbs, sometimes with wings. Some examples, such as the 16th-century lindworm statue at Lindwurm Fountain in Klagenfurt, Austria, have four limbs and two wings.

Most limbed depictions imply that lindworms do not walk on two limbs like a wyvern but move like a mole lizard: they slither like a snake and use their arms for traction.

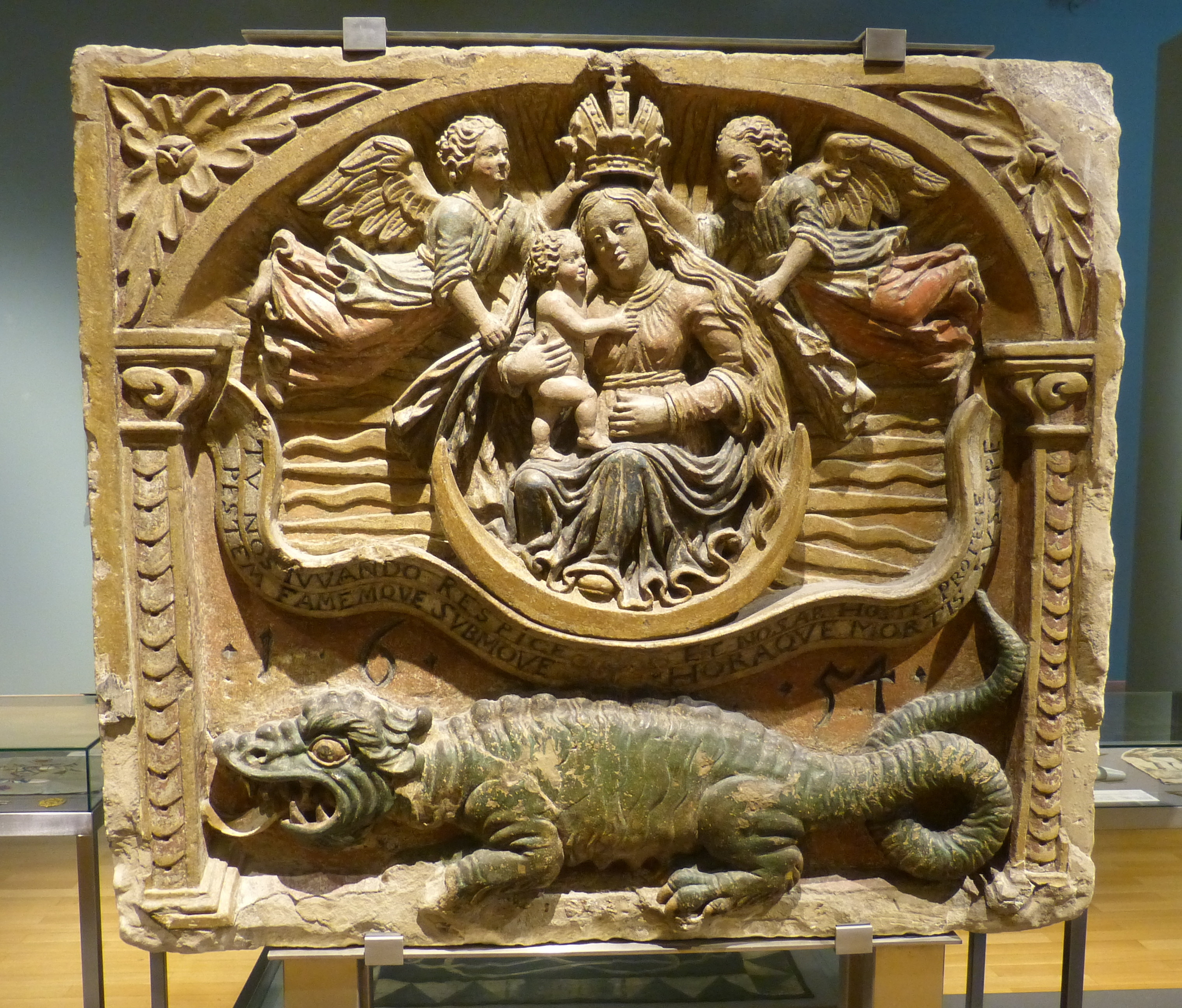
Wingless four-legged lindworm on a German relief (1566)

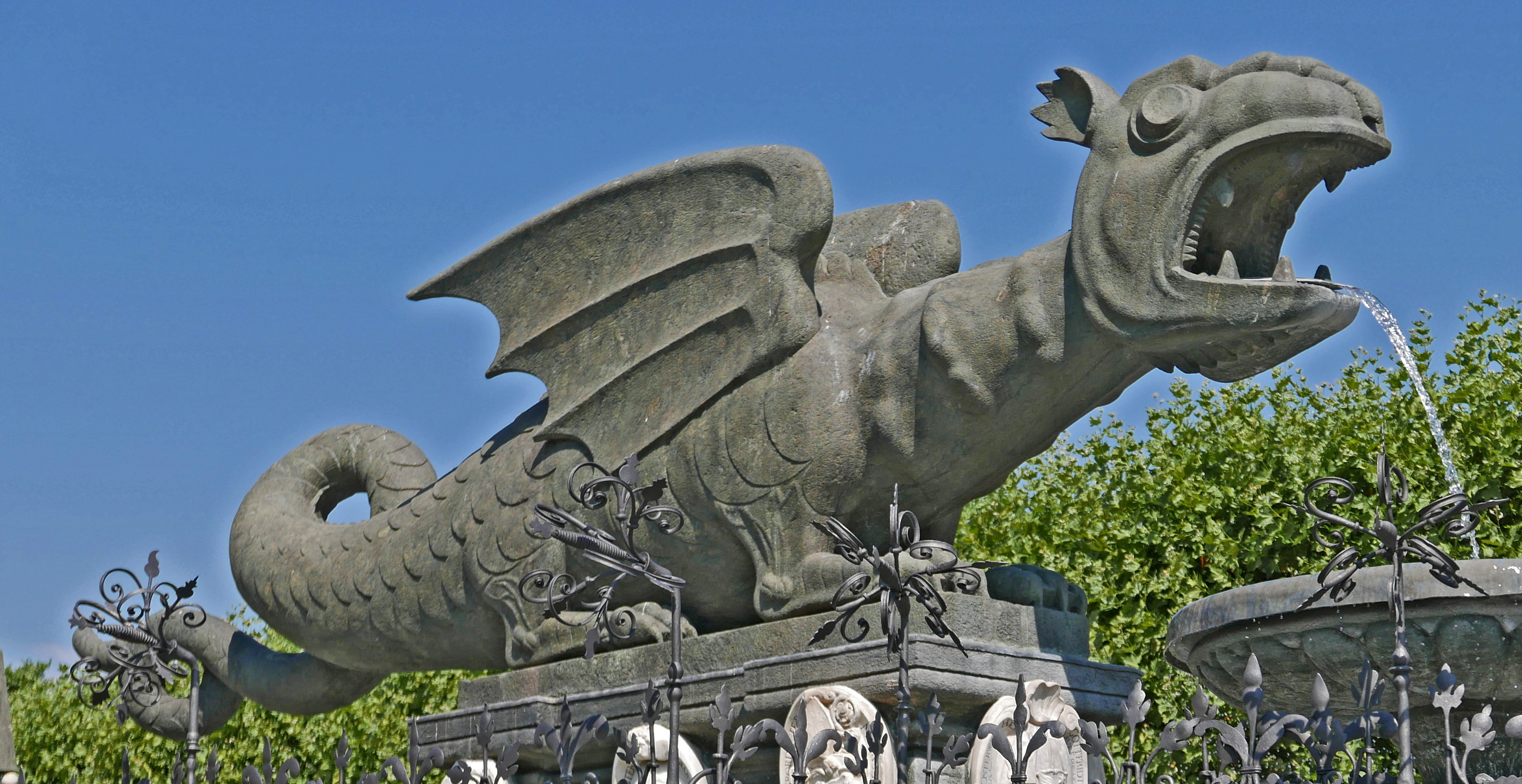
Winged four-legged lindworm fountain in Klagenfurt (16th century)

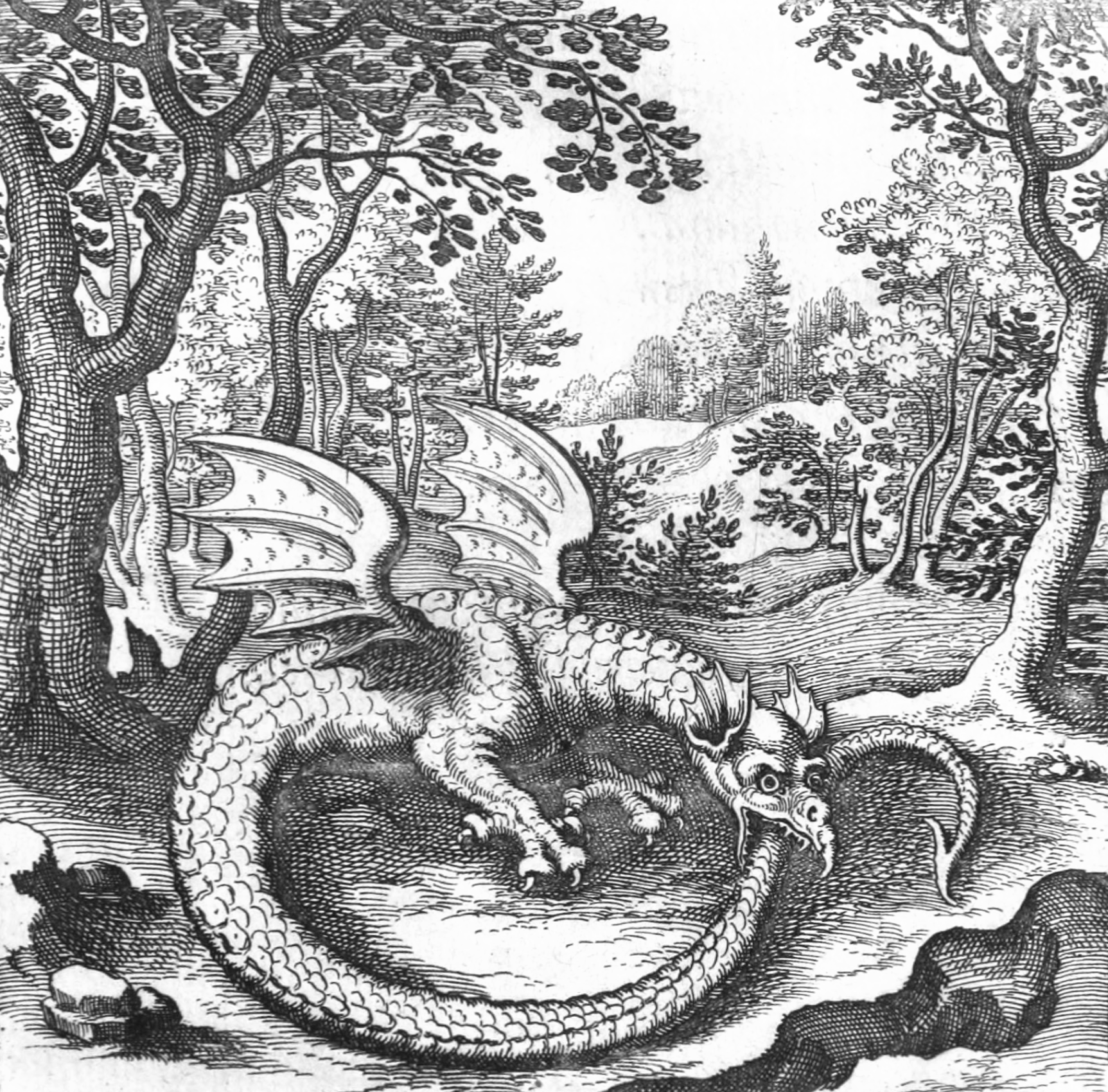
Winged fore-legged Lindworm in Musaeum Hermeticum (1678)

== In heraldry ==
According to the 19th-century English archaeologist Charles Boutell, a lindworm in heraldry is basically "a dragon without wings". A different heraldic definition by German historian Maximilian Gritzner was "a dragon with four feet" instead of usual two, so that depictions with – comparatively smaller – wings exist as well.

Wingless limbed lindworm in the arms of the small Bavarian town of Wurmannsquick

Winged and limbed lindworm in the arms of the city of Klagenfurt

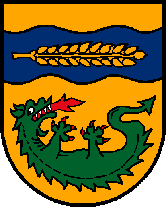
Wingless and four-limbed lindworm in the arms of the city of Sipbachzell

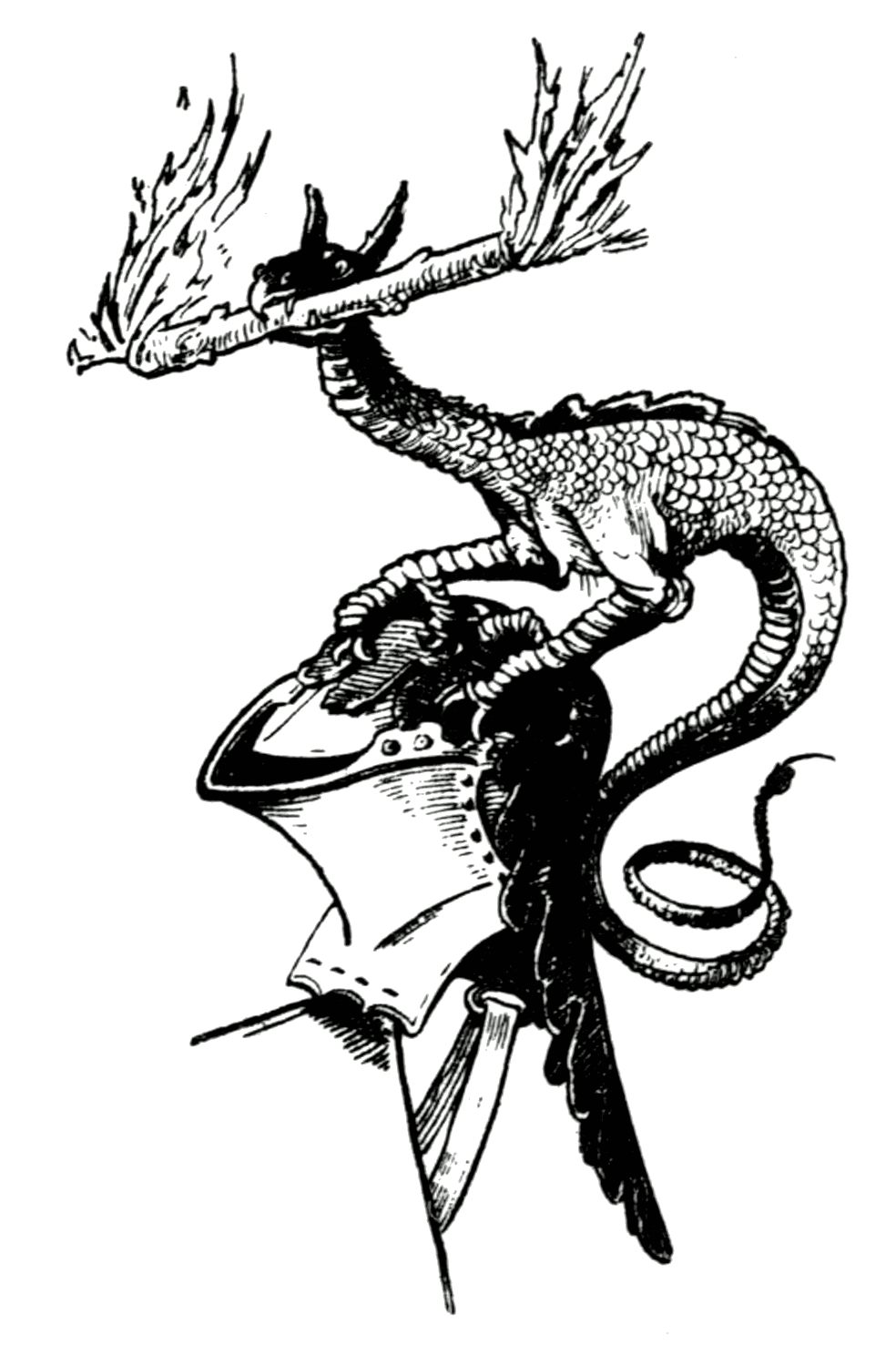
Wingless bipedal lindworm as a jousting helmet decoration

== In tales ==
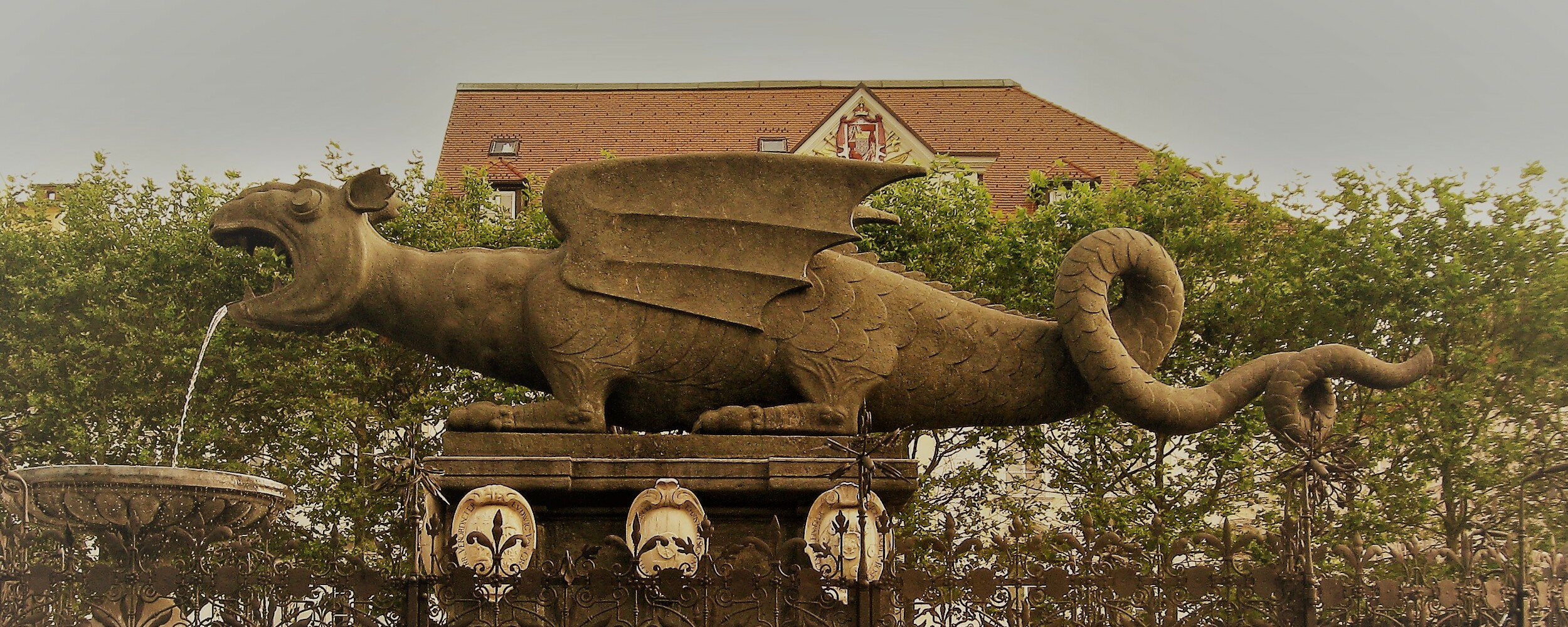
16th-century lindworm statue in Klagenfurt, Austria, featuring wings and limbs

An Austrian tale from the 13th century tells of a lindworm that lived near Klagenfurt. Flooding threatened travelers along the river, and the presence of the lindworm was blamed. A duke offered a reward to anyone who could capture it and so some young men tied a bull to a chain, and when the lindworm swallowed the bull, it was hooked like a fish and killed.

The shed skin of a lindworm was believed to greatly increase a person's knowledge about nature and medicine.

A serpentine monster with the head of a "salamander" features in the legend of the Lambton Worm, a serpent caught in the River Wear and dropped in a well, which 3–4 years thence, terrorized the countryside of Durham while the nobleman who caught it was at the Crusades. Upon return, he received spiked armour and instructions to kill the serpent, but thereafter to kill the next living thing he saw. His father arranged that after the lindworm was killed, a dog would be released for that purpose; but instead of releasing the dog the nobleman's father ran to his son, and so incurred a malediction by the son's refusal to commit patricide. Bram Stoker used this legend in his short story Lair of the White Worm.

The sighting of a "whiteworm" once was thought to be an exceptional sign of good luck.

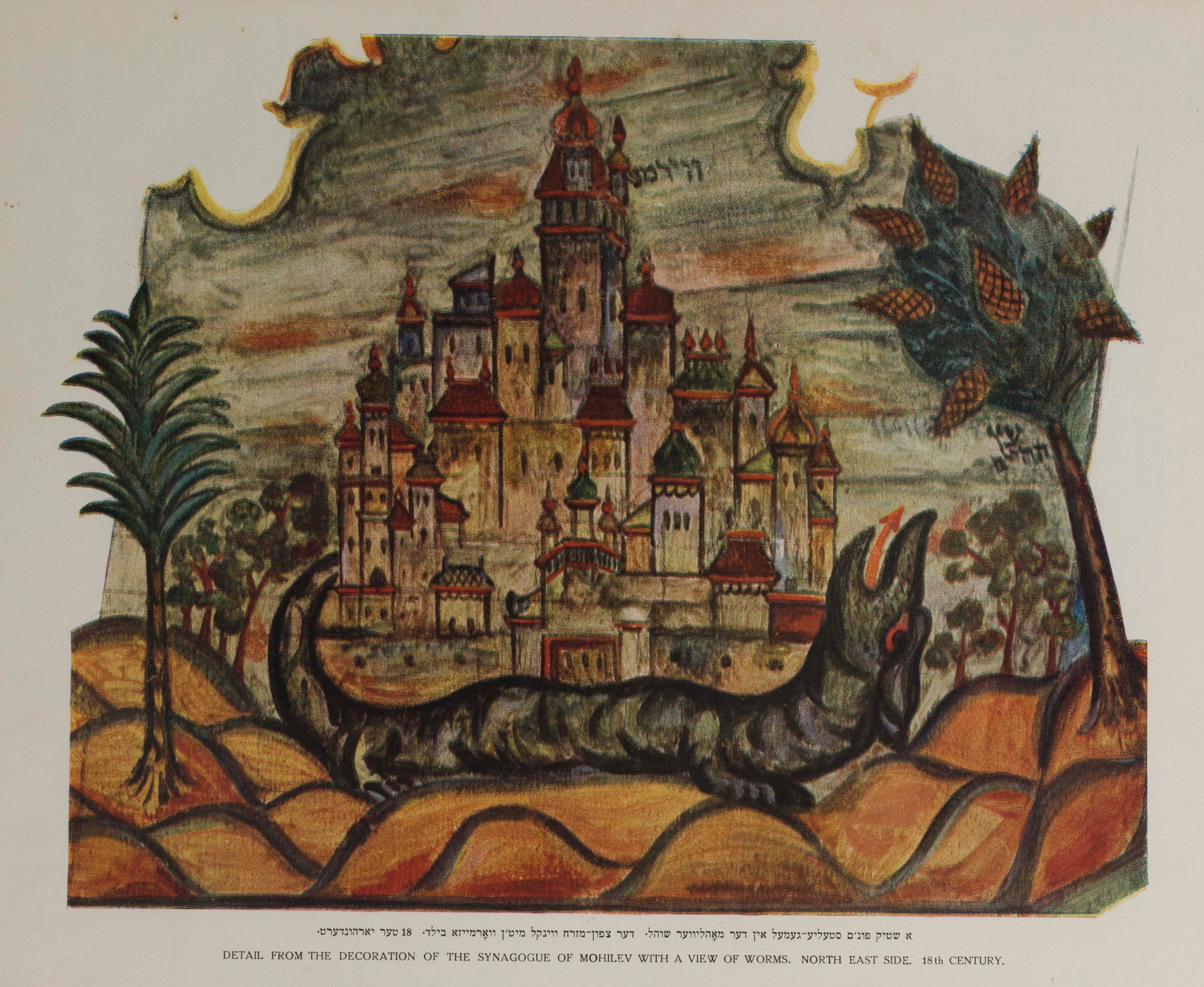
A painting of the city of Worms and the Lindworm, as depicted in the story by Juspa Schammes. The painting was displayed in Cold Synagogue, Mogilev.

A German folk legend, written in the 17th-century by Juspa Schammes, tells that the origin of the name of the city of Worms is rooted in a tale involving lindworm: This creature, resembling a snake and a worm, arrived in the city of Germisa and terrorized its inhabitants. Every day, the people held a lottery to determine which of them would be sacrificed to the lindworm in order to spare the city from destruction. Eventually, the lot fell on the queen. One of the city's heroes refused to allow her to sacrifice herself and offered to replace her on the condition that if he survived, she would marry him. The queen agreed, and he donned iron armor. After the lindworm swallowed him, he cut his way out from the inside and killed it. He married the queen, became king, and renamed the city to Worms to commemorate this tale.

The knucker or the Tatzelwurm is a wingless biped, and often identified as a lindworm. In legends, lindworms are often very large and eat cattle and human corpses, sometimes invading churchyards and eating the dead from cemeteries.

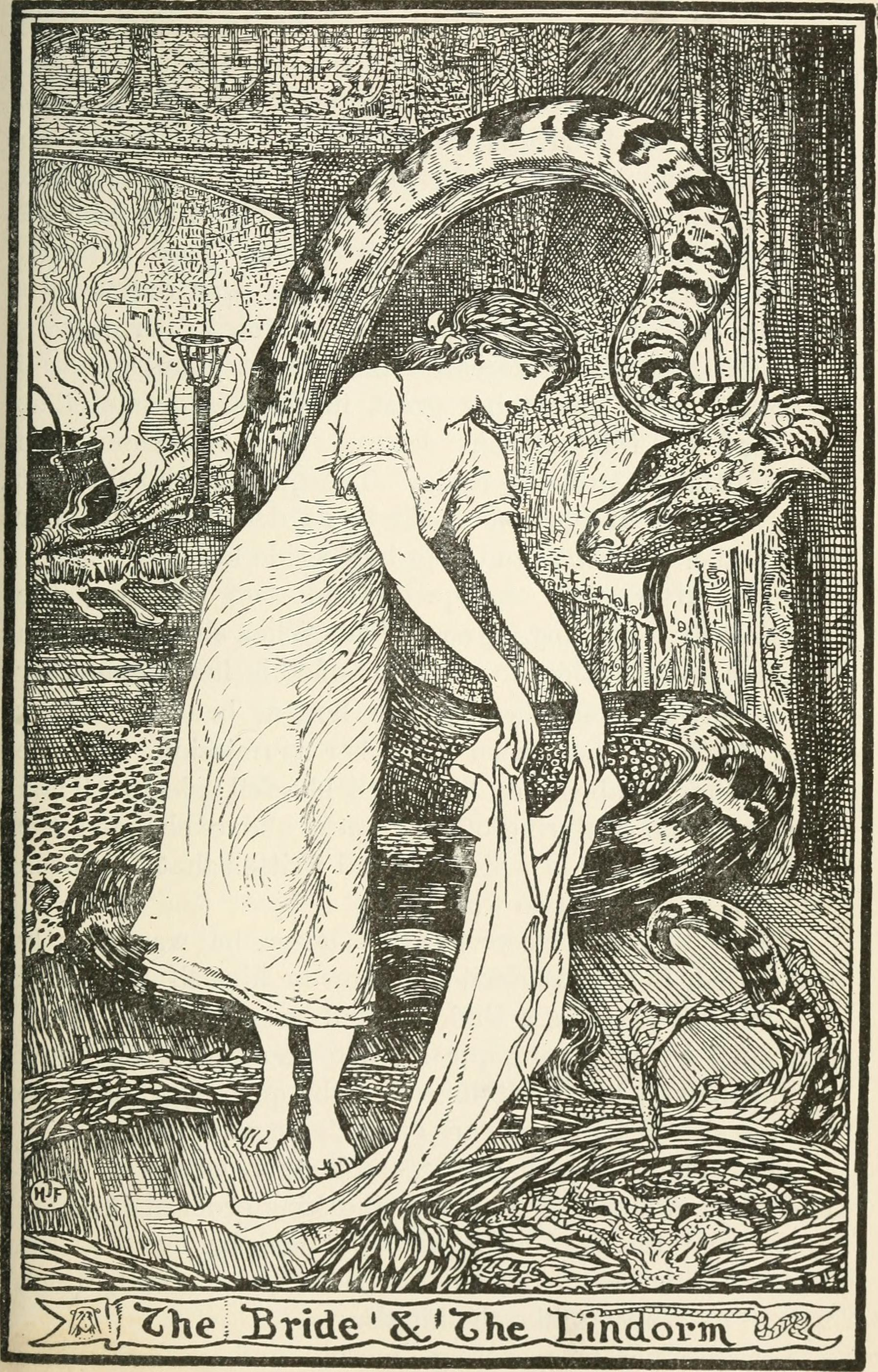
The maiden amidst the Lindorm's shed skins. Illustration by Henry Justice Ford for Andrew Lang's The Pink Fairy Book (1897).

In the 19th-century tale of "Prince Lindworm" (also "King Lindworm") from Scandinavian folklore, a "half-man half-snake" lindworm is born, as one of twins, to a queen, who, in an effort to overcome her childlessness, followed the advice of an old crone who instructed her to eat two onions. As she did not peel the first onion, the first twin was born a lindworm. The second twin is perfect in every way. When he grows up and sets off to find a bride, the lindworm insists that a bride be found for him before his younger brother can marry. Because none of the chosen maidens are pleased by him, he eats each one until a shepherd's daughter who spoke to the same crone is brought to marry him, wearing every dress she owns. The lindworm tells her to take off her dress, but she insists that he shed a skin for each dress she removes. Eventually, his human form is revealed beneath the last skin. Some versions of the story omit the lindworm's twin, and the gender of the soothsayer varies. A similar tale occurs in the 1952 novel The Voyage of the Dawn Treader by C. S. Lewis.

The tale of Prince Lindworm is part of a multiverse of tales in which a maiden is betrothed or wooed by a prince enchanted to be a snake or other serpentine creature (ATU 433B, "The Prince as Serpent"; "King Lindworm").

In a short Swiss tale, a Lindworm terrorises the area around Grabs. "It was as big as a tree trunk, dark red in colour and, according to its nature, extraordinarily vicious". It was defeated by a bull that had been fed milk for seven years and had hooks attached its horns. A girl, who had committed an offense, was tasked with bringing the bull to the Lindworm. After the beast was defeated, the enraged bull threw itself off a cliff, but the girl survived. In another tale, a cowherd falls into a cave where a Lindworm lives. Instead of eating him, the Lindworm shares his food source, a spring of liquid gold. After seven years, they are discovered by a Venetian who hauls up the Lindworm and ties it up. The cowherd releases the Lindworm, who kills the Venetian and then leaves. When the cowherd goes home, no one recognizes him and he no longer likes human food.

In the Astrid Lindgren book Brothers Lionheart, the dragon Katla has a mortal enemy in the form of a lindworm named Karm. While Katla is the pet of Dark Lord Tengil, Karm lives under a waterfall. In the end scene of the book, they fight each other into the death.

== See also ==
- Little Wildrose
- The Laidly Worm of Spindleston Heugh
- Tulisa, the Wood-Cutter's Daughter, Indian tale about a Serpent Prince
- Germanic dragon
