= Maria-Theresien-Platz =

Square in Vienna, between two museums

Coordinates: 48.2045°N 16.3608°E

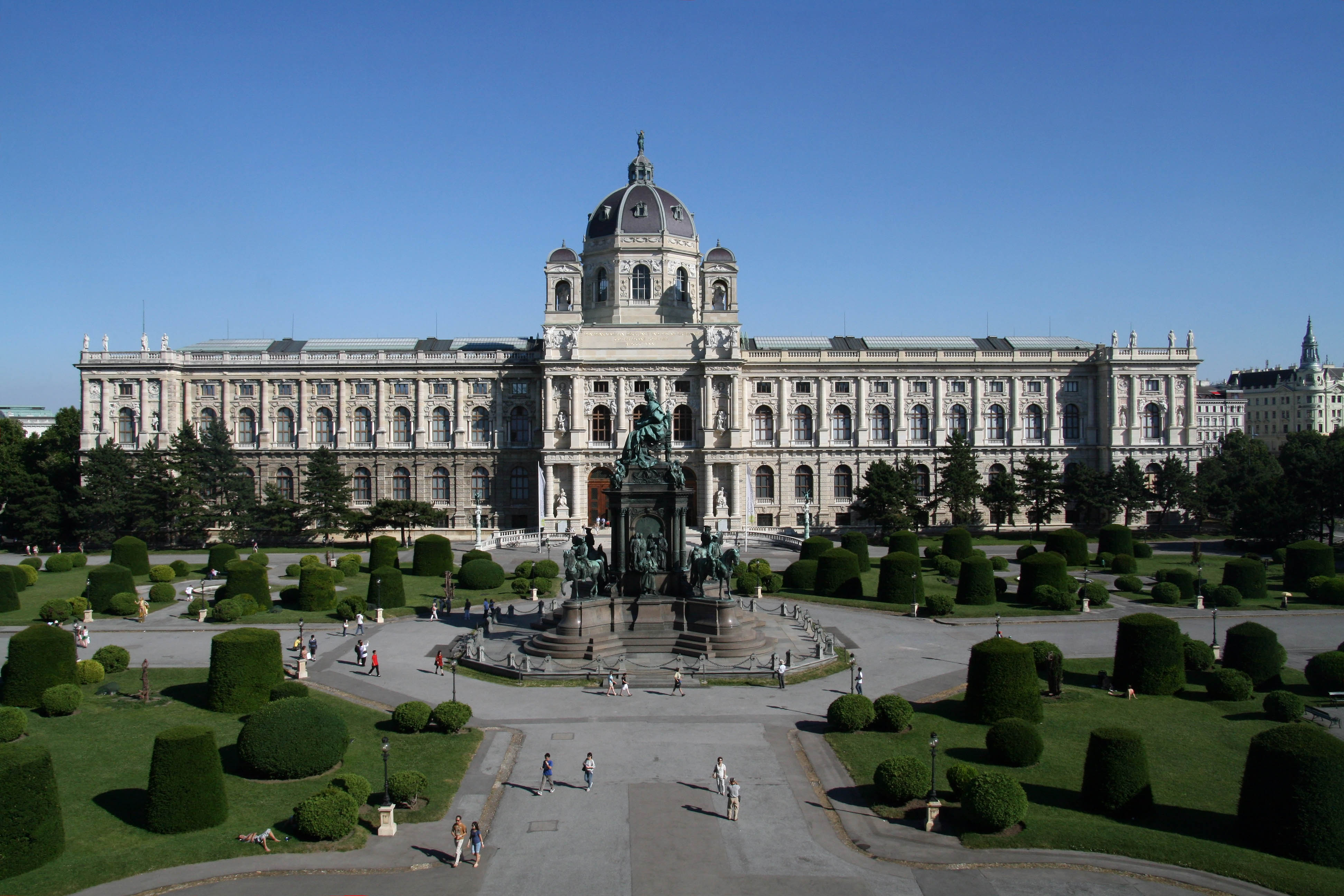
Kunsthistorisches Museum at Maria-Theresien-Platz, Vienna

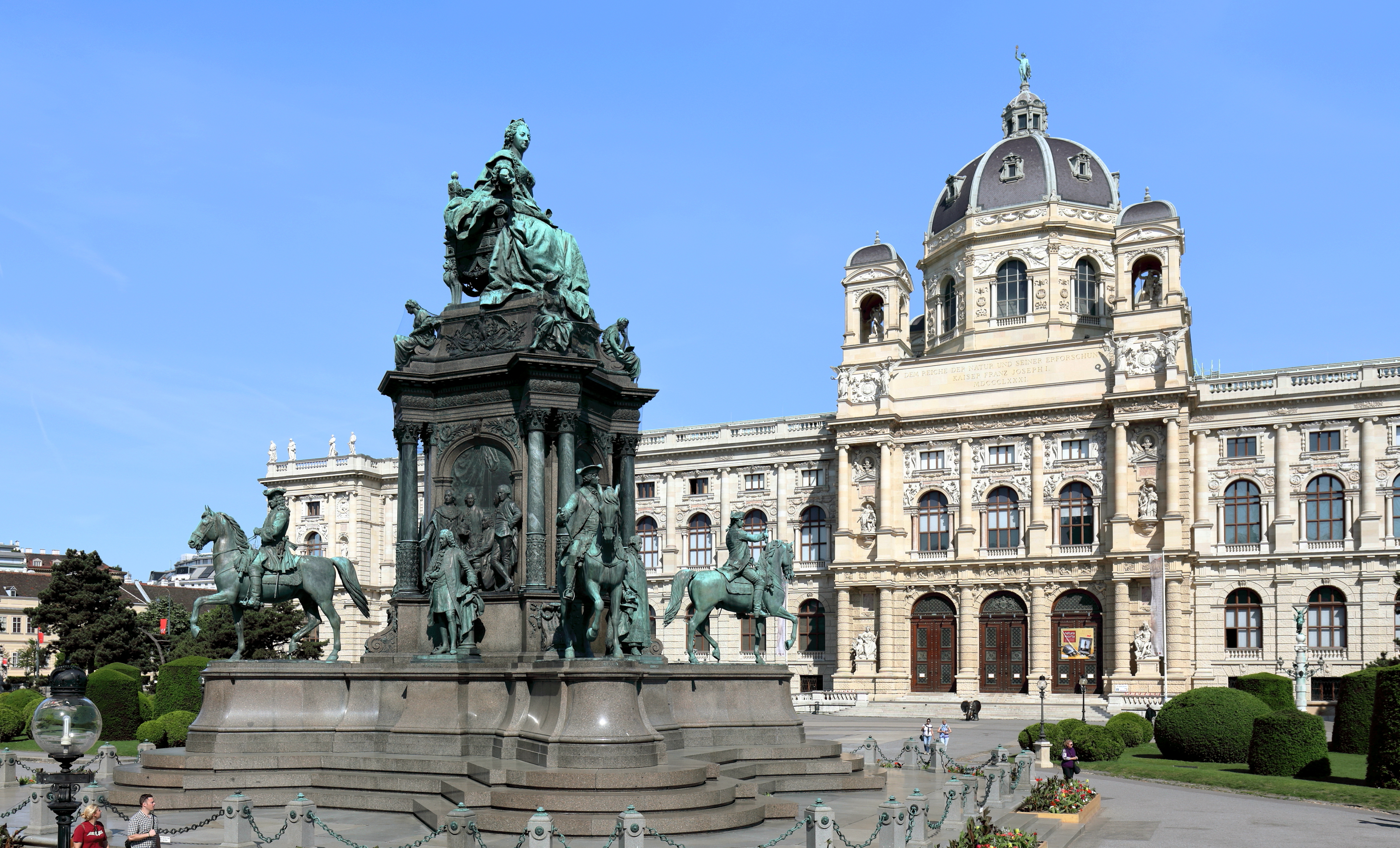
Empress Maria Theresia monument and Natural History Museum at Maria-Theresien-Platz, Vienna

Maria-Theresien-Platz is a large public square in Vienna, Austria, that joins the Ringstraße with the Museumsquartier, a museum of modern arts located in the former Imperial Stables. Facing each other from the sides of the square are two near identical buildings, the Naturhistorisches Museum (Natural History Museum) and the Kunsthistorisches Museum (Art History Museum). The buildings are near identical, except for the statuary on their façades. The Naturhistorisches' façade has statues depicting personifications of Africa, Asia, Europe, and the Americas. The Kunsthistorisches façade features famous European artists, such as the Dutch Bruegel, among others.

The Naturhistorisches Museum and the Kunsthistorisches Museum and the square adjoining them were built in 1889. At the center of the square stands the Maria-Theresia Memorial, a large statue depicting Empress Maria Theresa, namesake of the square. The Modern Art Museum in the former Imperial Stables shows contemporary works that some may consider controversial. The three museums are popular destinations for tourists.

The Kunsthistorisches Museum contains numerous famous works by the Northern European masters, such as Bruegel's Tower of Babel, as well as an extensive collection of ancient world art. The Egyptian collection (Aegyptisches Sammlung) houses mummified forms, stone carvings, and the tomb of an Egyptian prince that was transported to Vienna and reassembled for Emperor Franz Joseph I of Austria. On the stairwell's roof are frescoes by the Austrian artist Gustav Klimt.

The Naturhistorisches Museum houses displays of butterflies and other insects, and an extensive preserved and stuffed animal collection, the most poignant examples of which include a Przewalskii's horse, a baby Javanese rhinoceros, and a case of dodo remains. Also notable is the museum's famous Mikrotheater, showing slides of microscopic organisms, its two spider crabs which were sent to Emperor Franz Joseph by the Japanese Emperor as a gift, and the first ever human depiction of an underwater scene made from life observation and the diving bell from which it was made. The stairwell contains paintings of Emperor Franz Joseph, Empress Maria Theresa and her stuffed pet lap dog, a miniature hound.

== Gallery ==
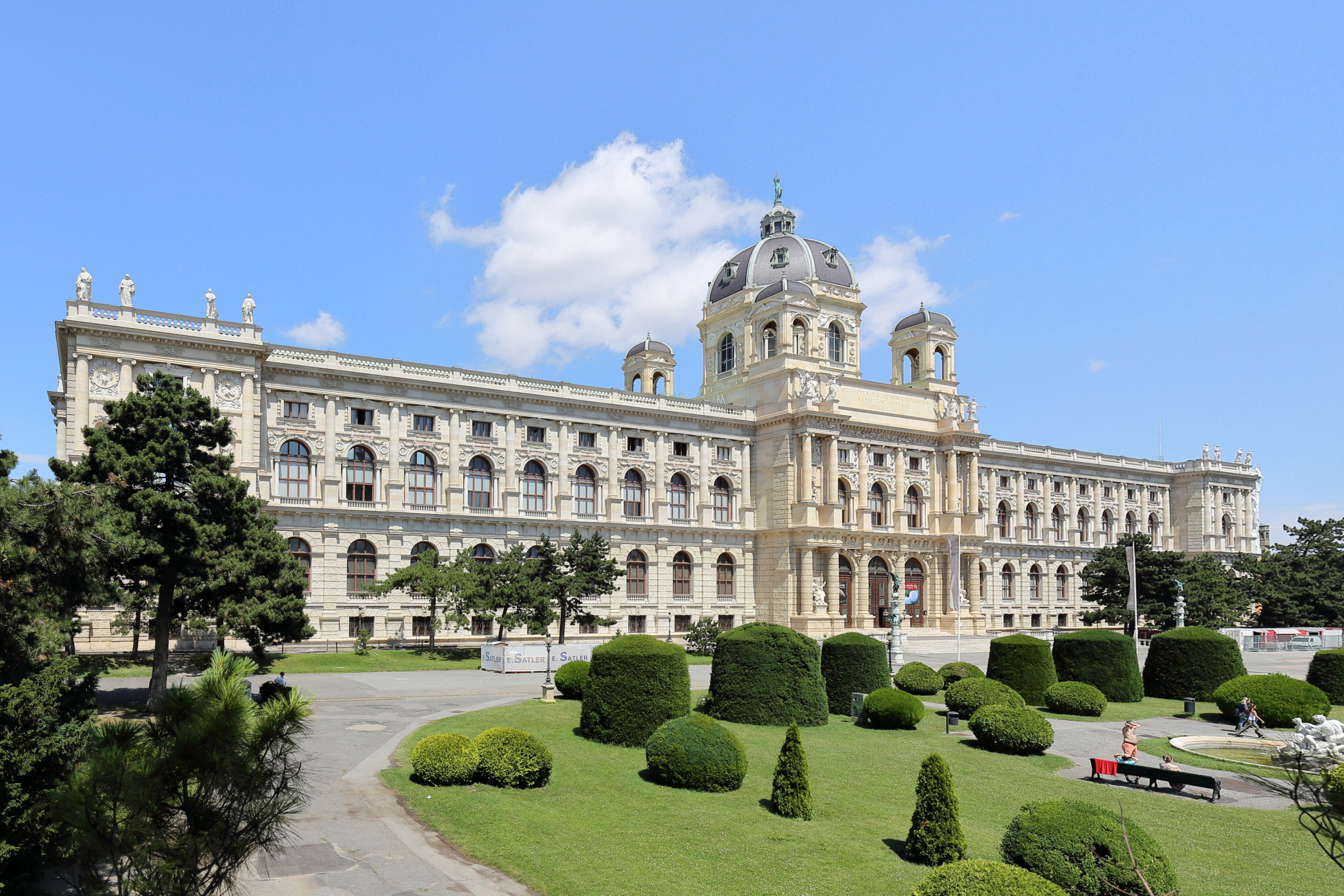
Naturhistorisches Museum

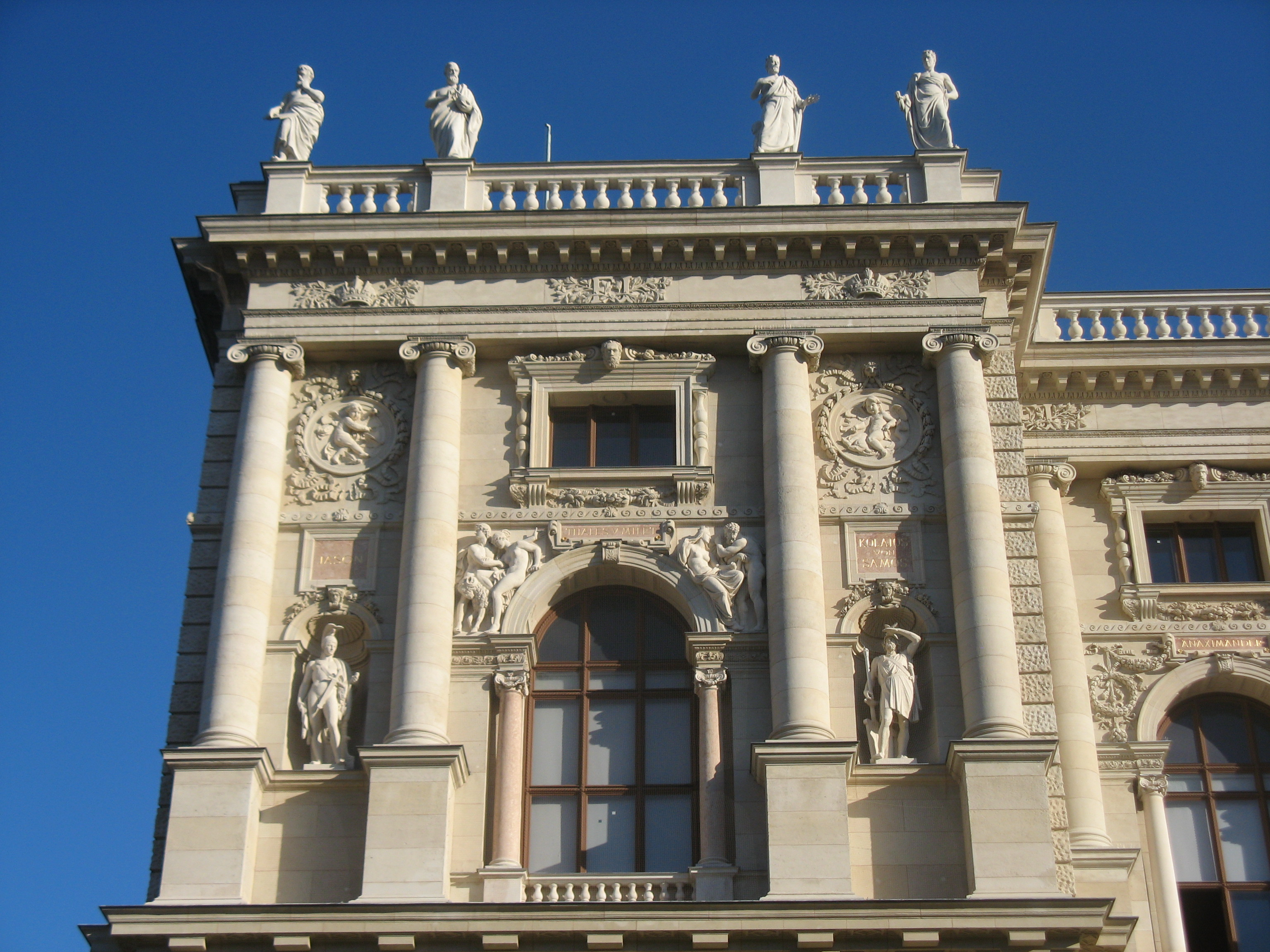
Naturhistorisches Museum, Bellariastraße

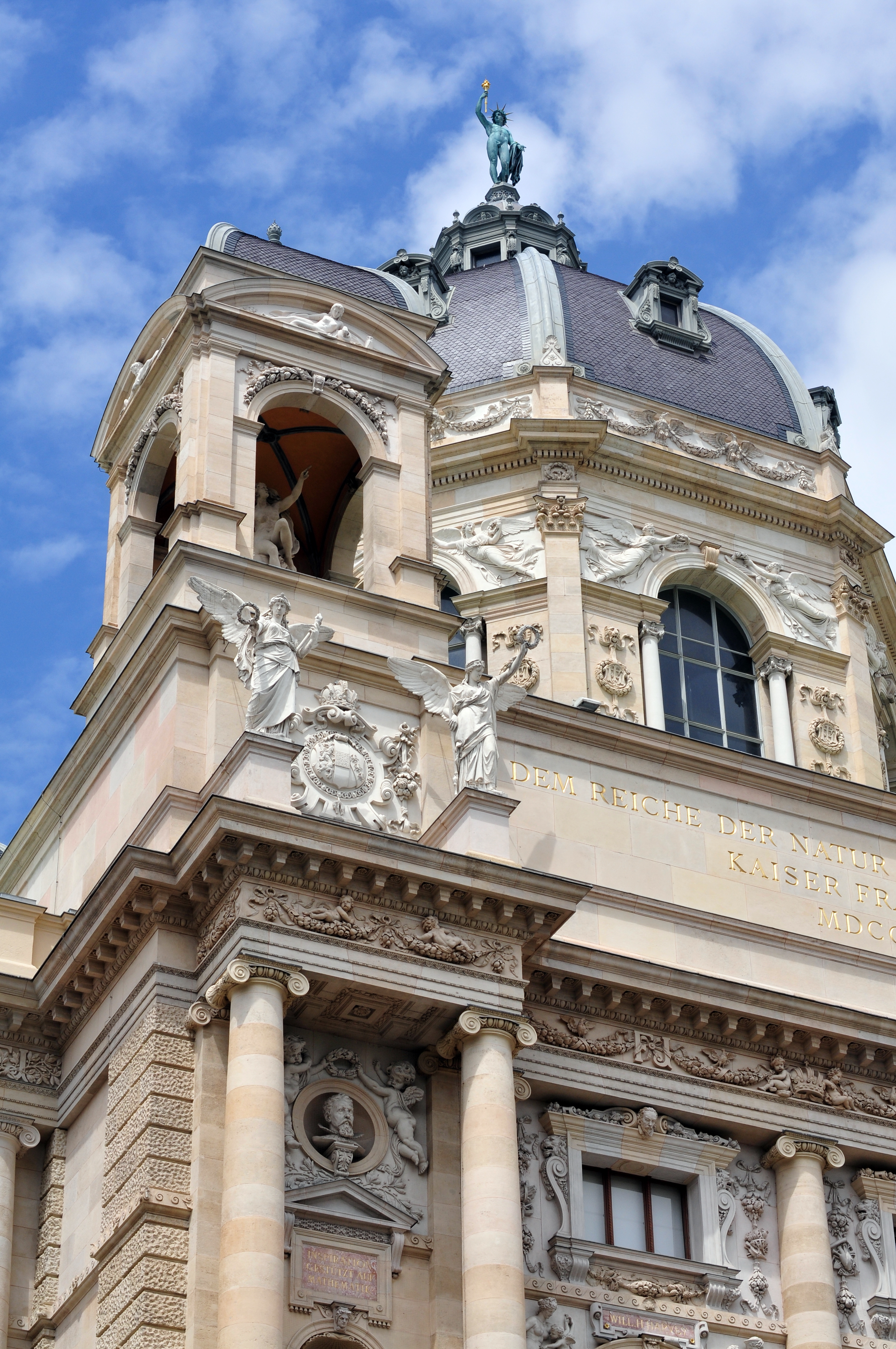
Naturhistorisches Museum

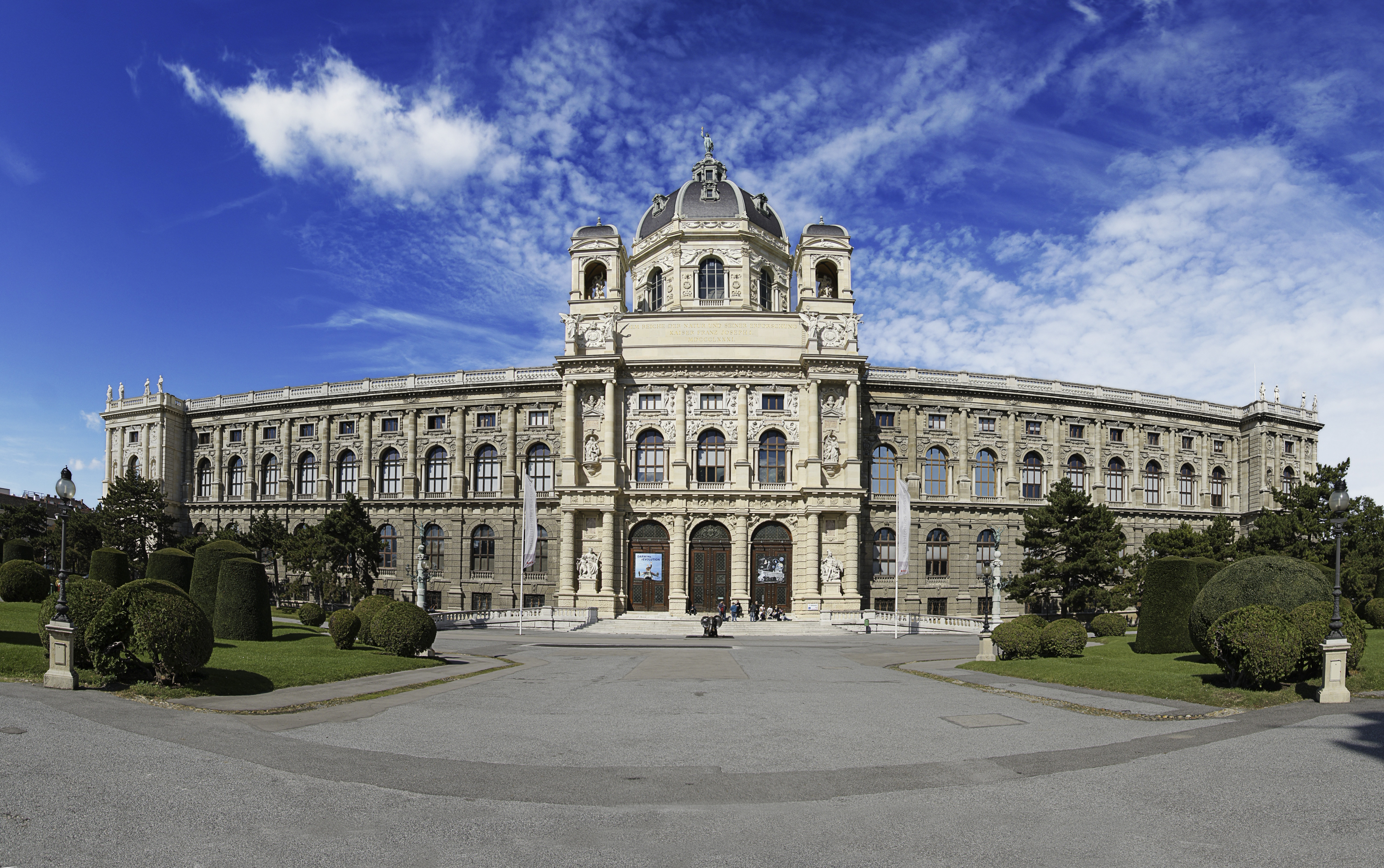
Naturhistorisches Museum

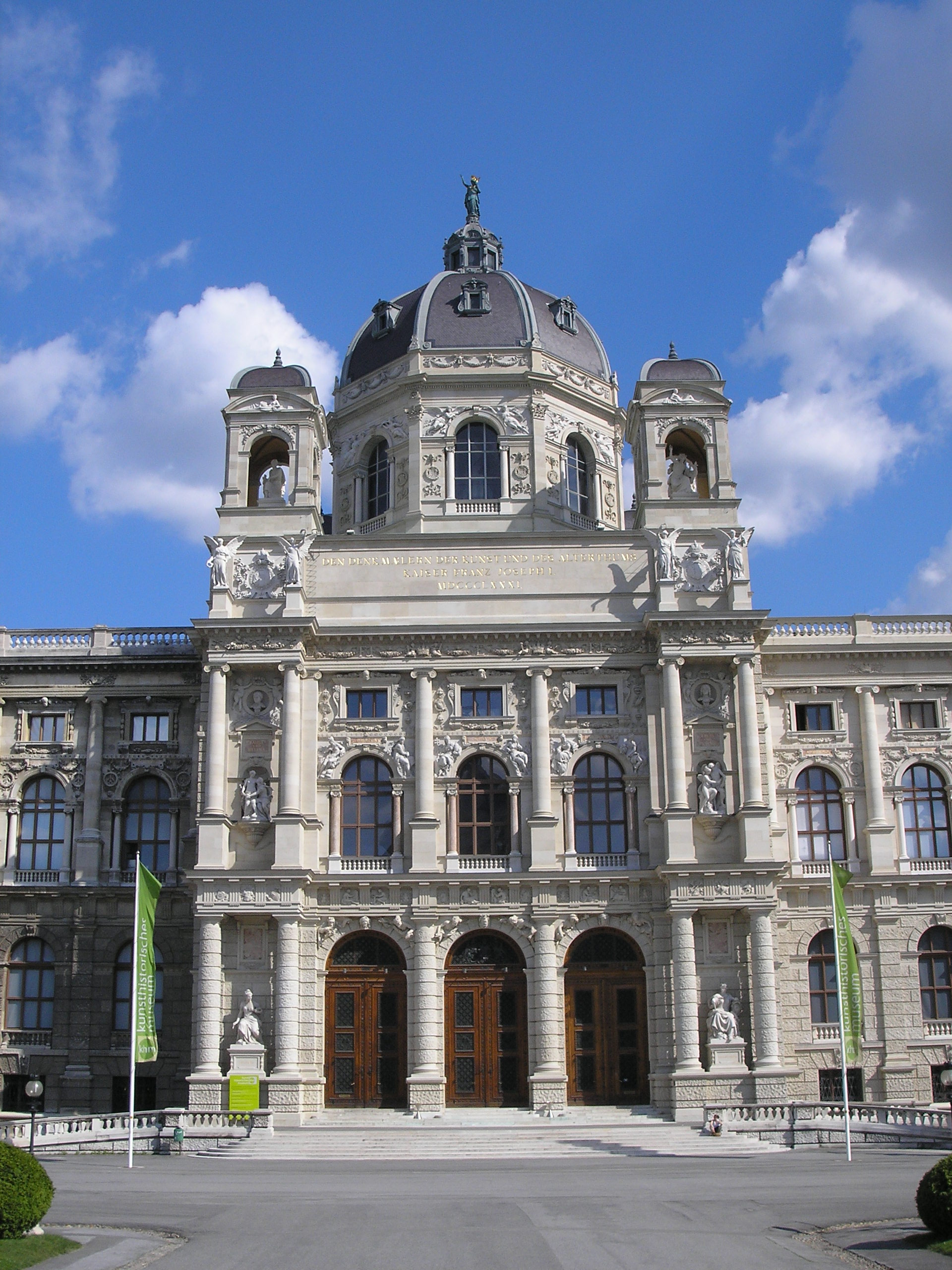
Kunsthistorisches Museum

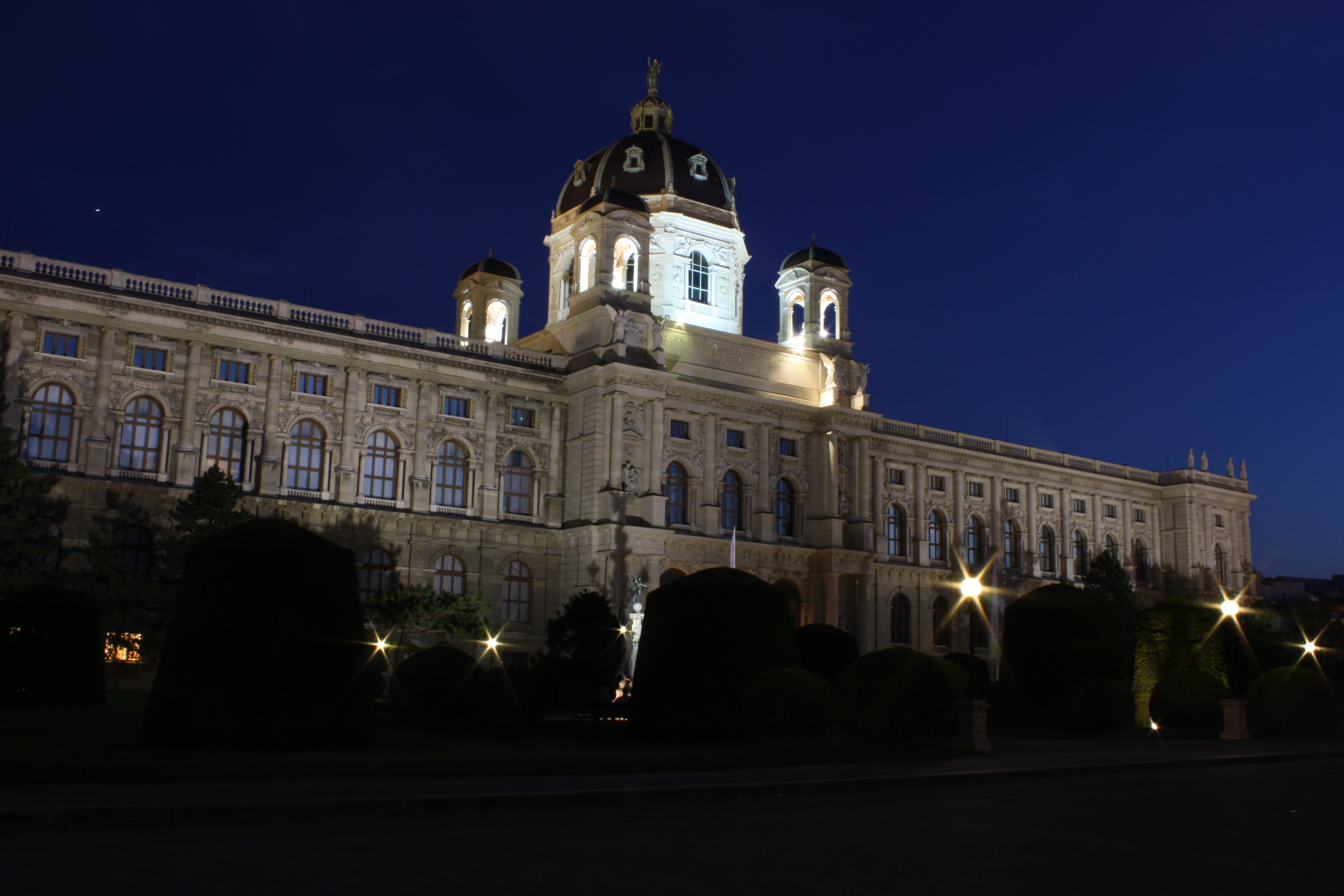
Kunsthistorisches Museum at night

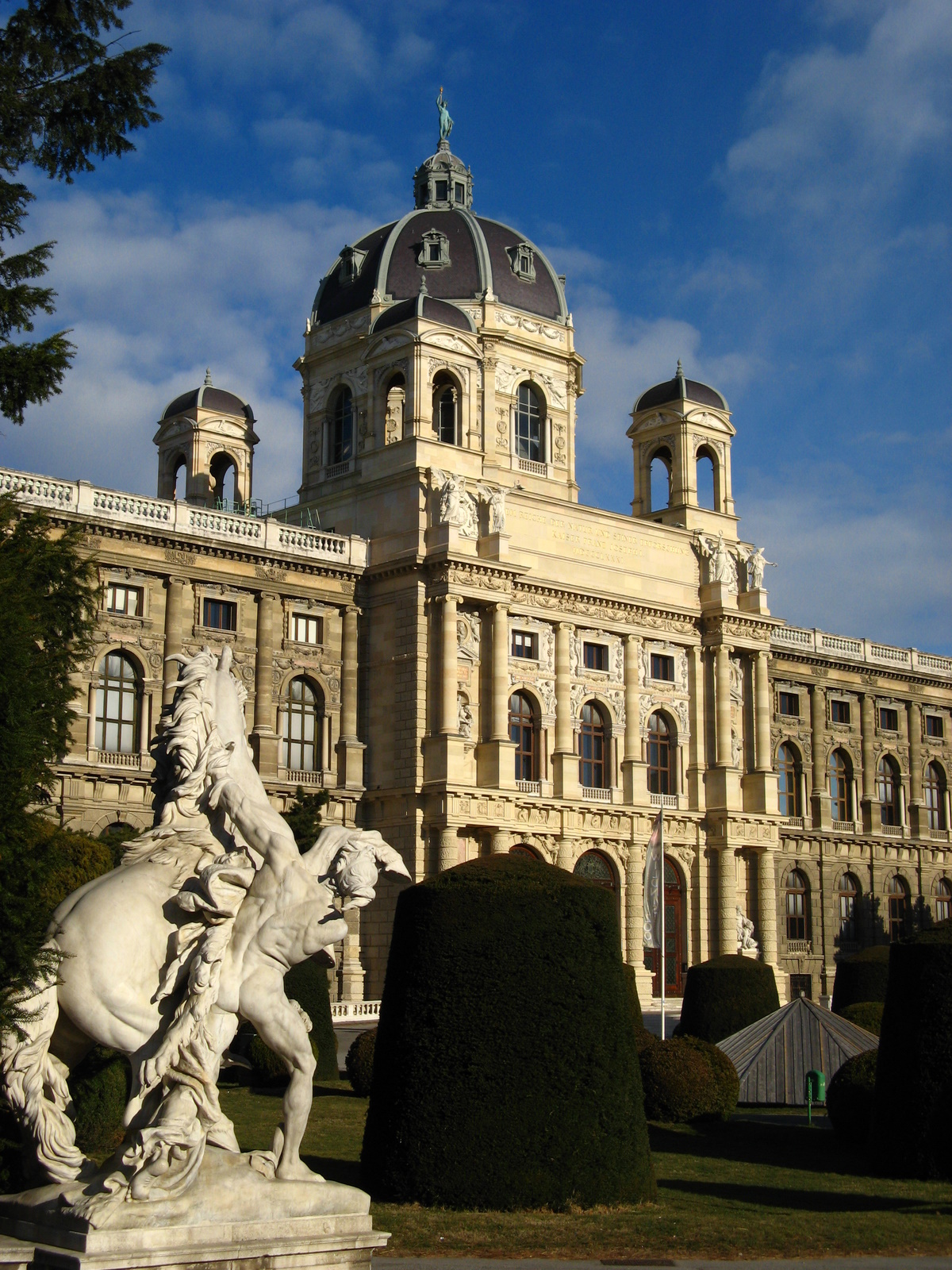
Rossebändiger

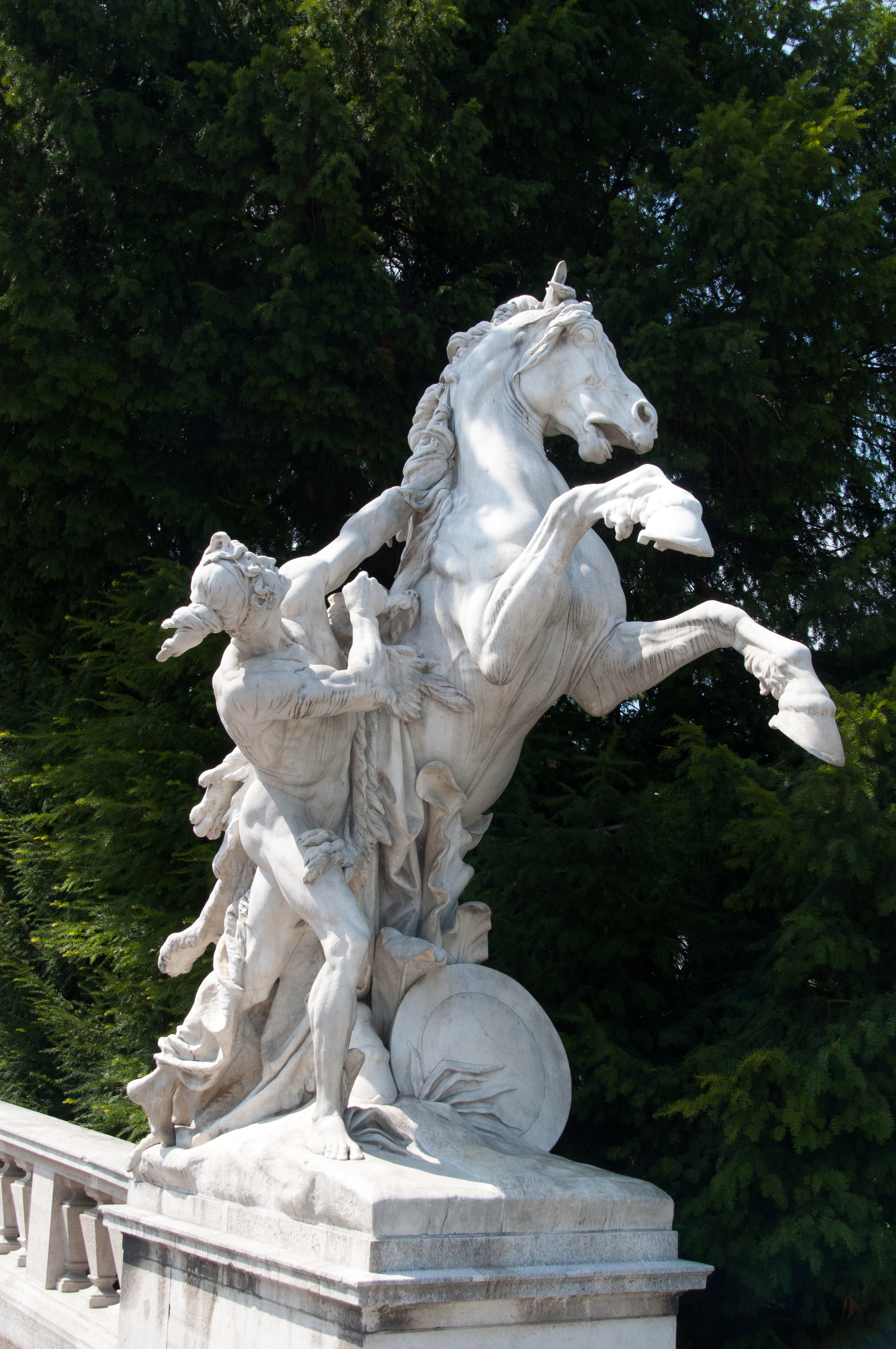
Rossebändiger

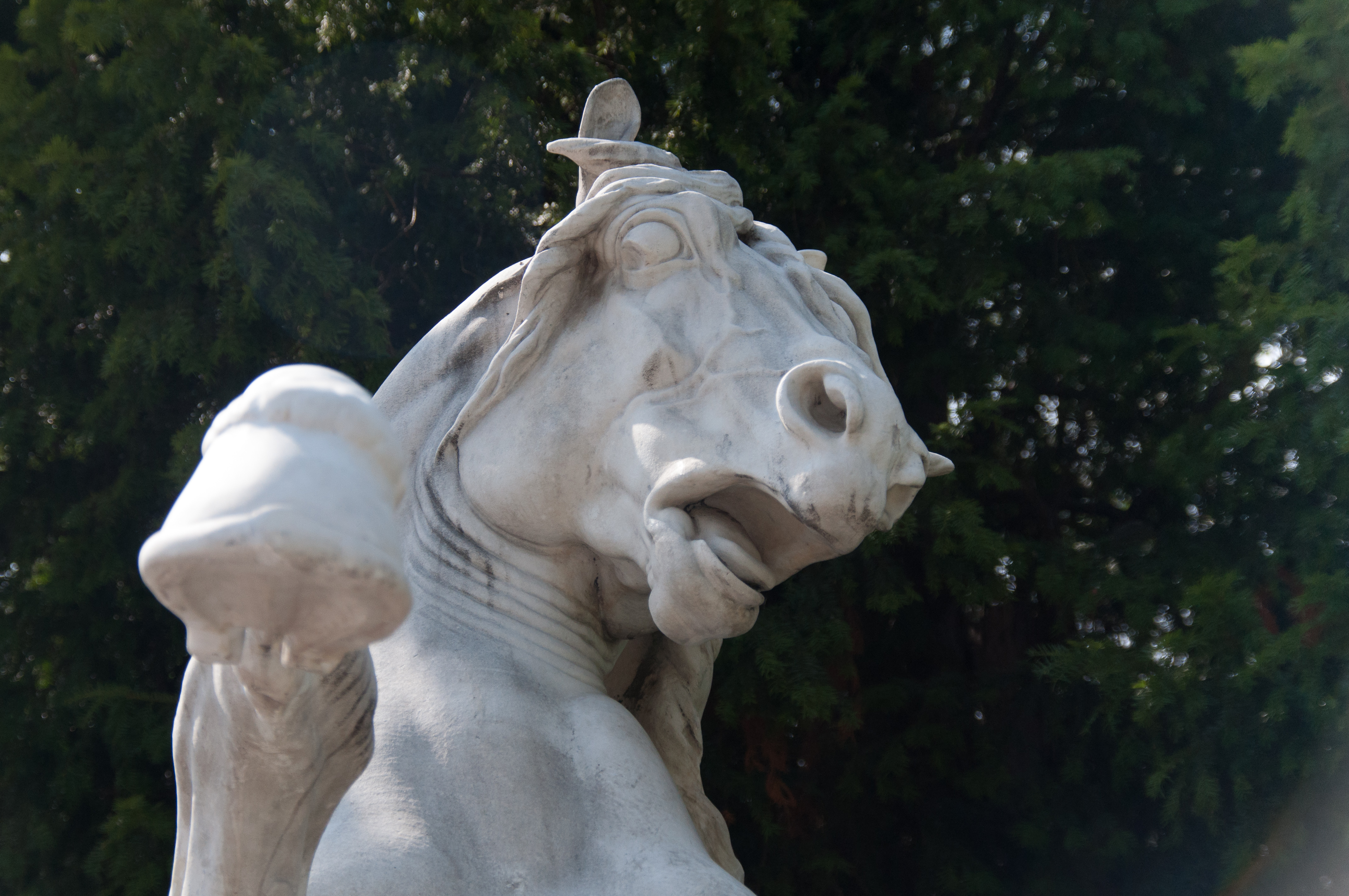
Rossebändiger (detail)

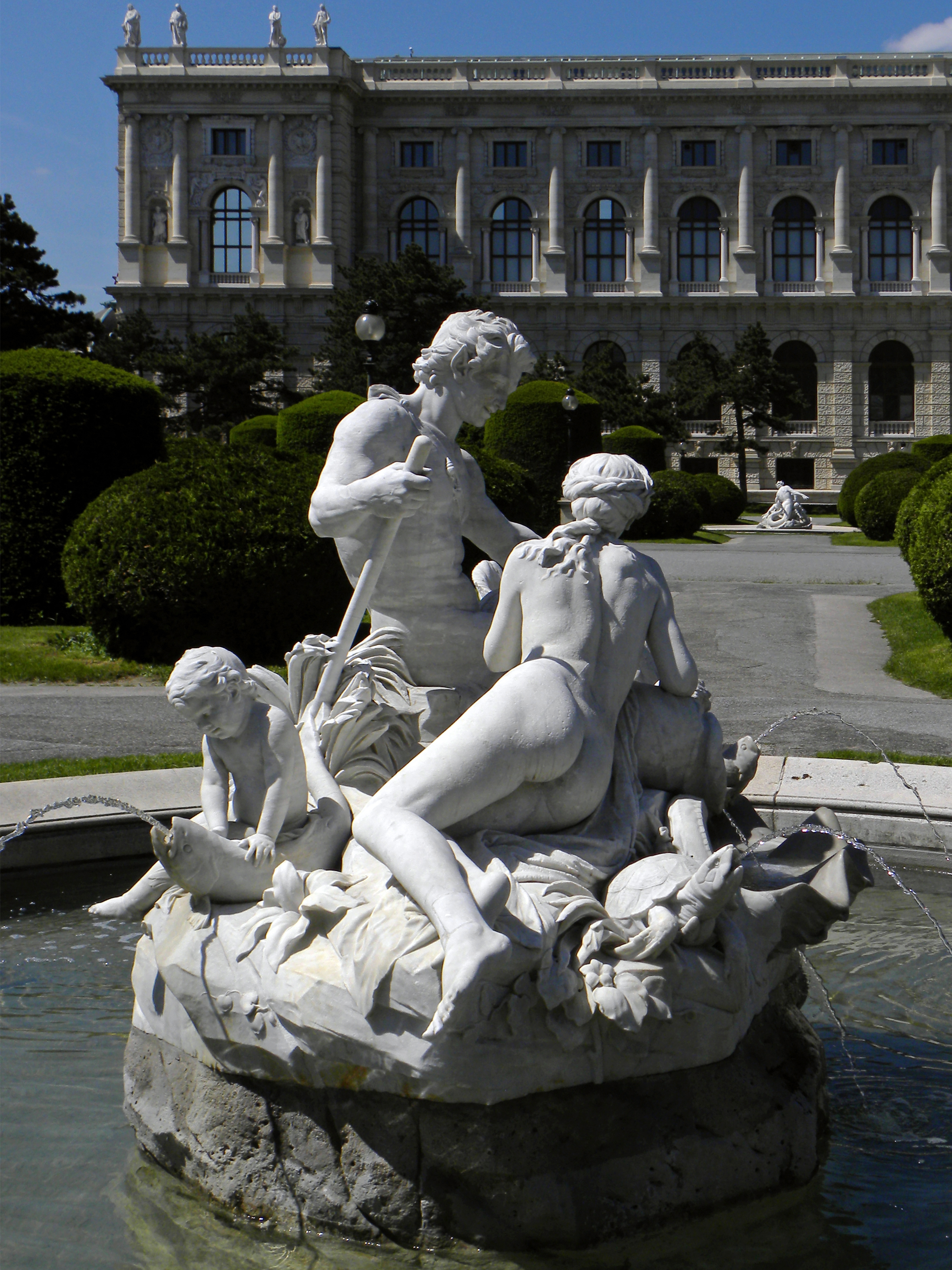
Tritons and Naiads Fountain by Edmund von Aspernburg

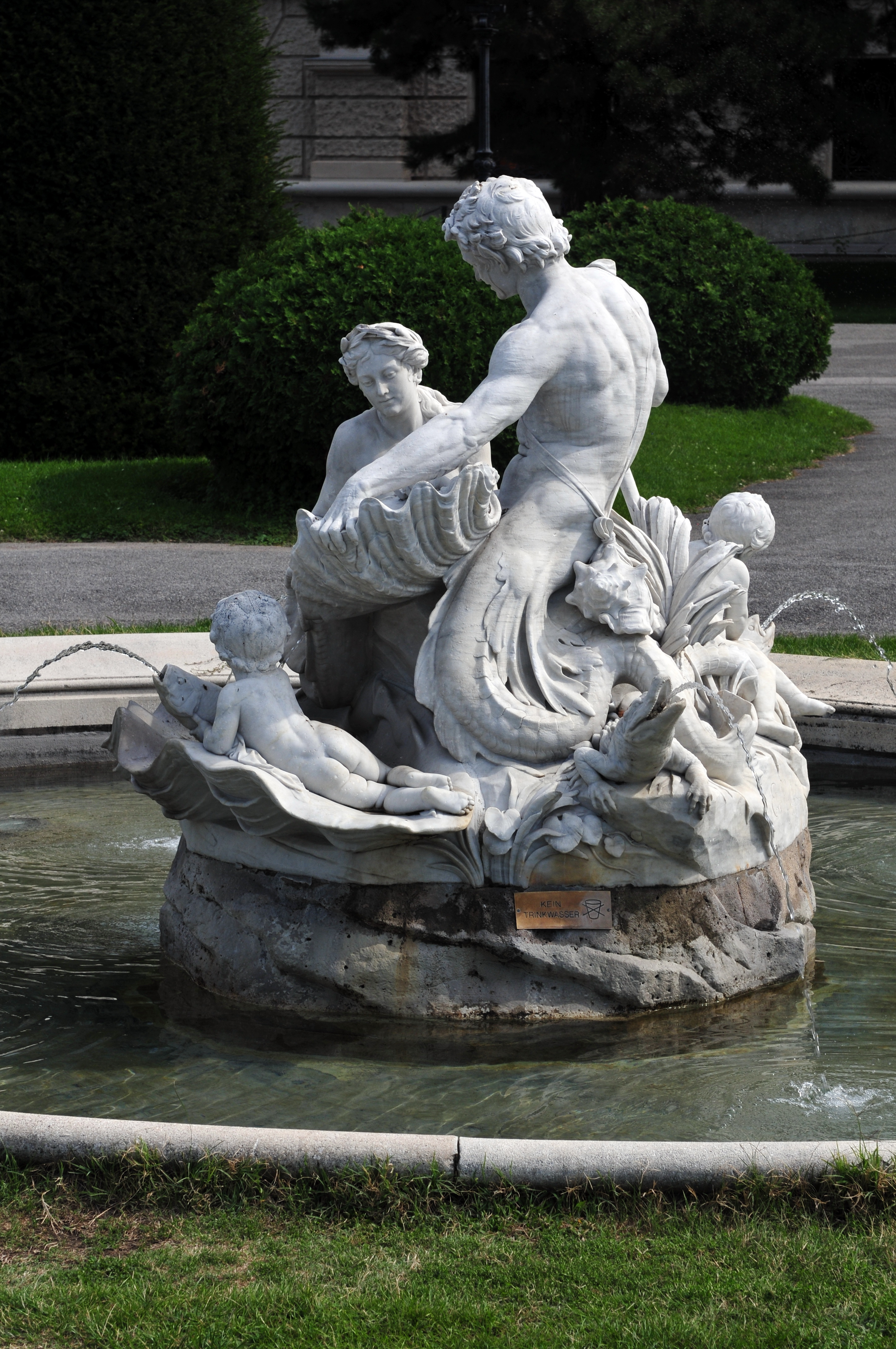
Tritons and Naiads Fountain

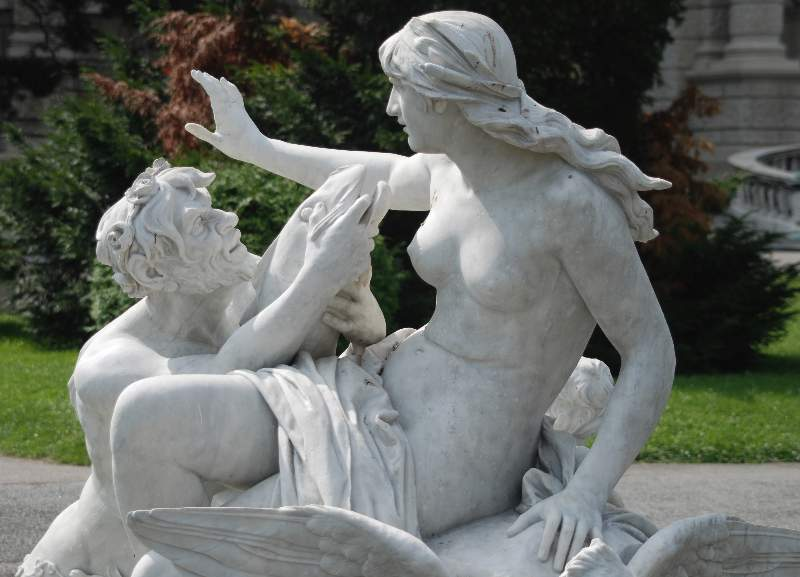
Tritons and Naiads Fountain

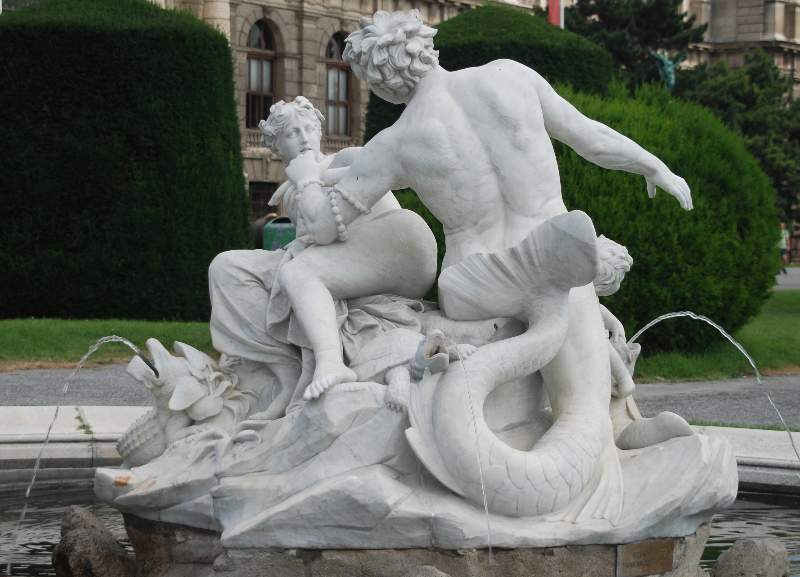
Tritons and Naiads Fountain
