= Maria Theresa Monument =

Monument in Vienna

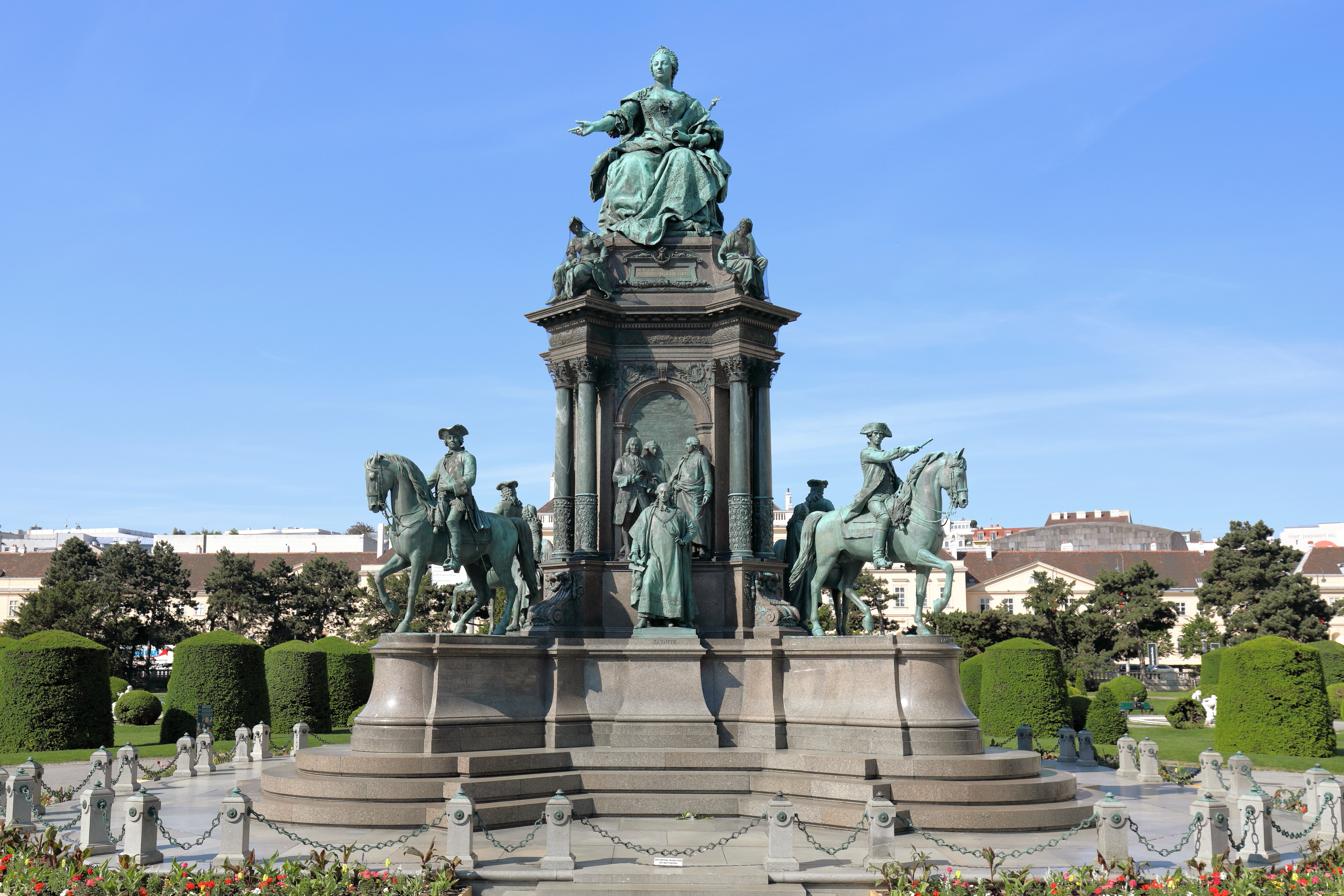
Maria-Theresia-Memorial on the Maria-Theresien-Platz

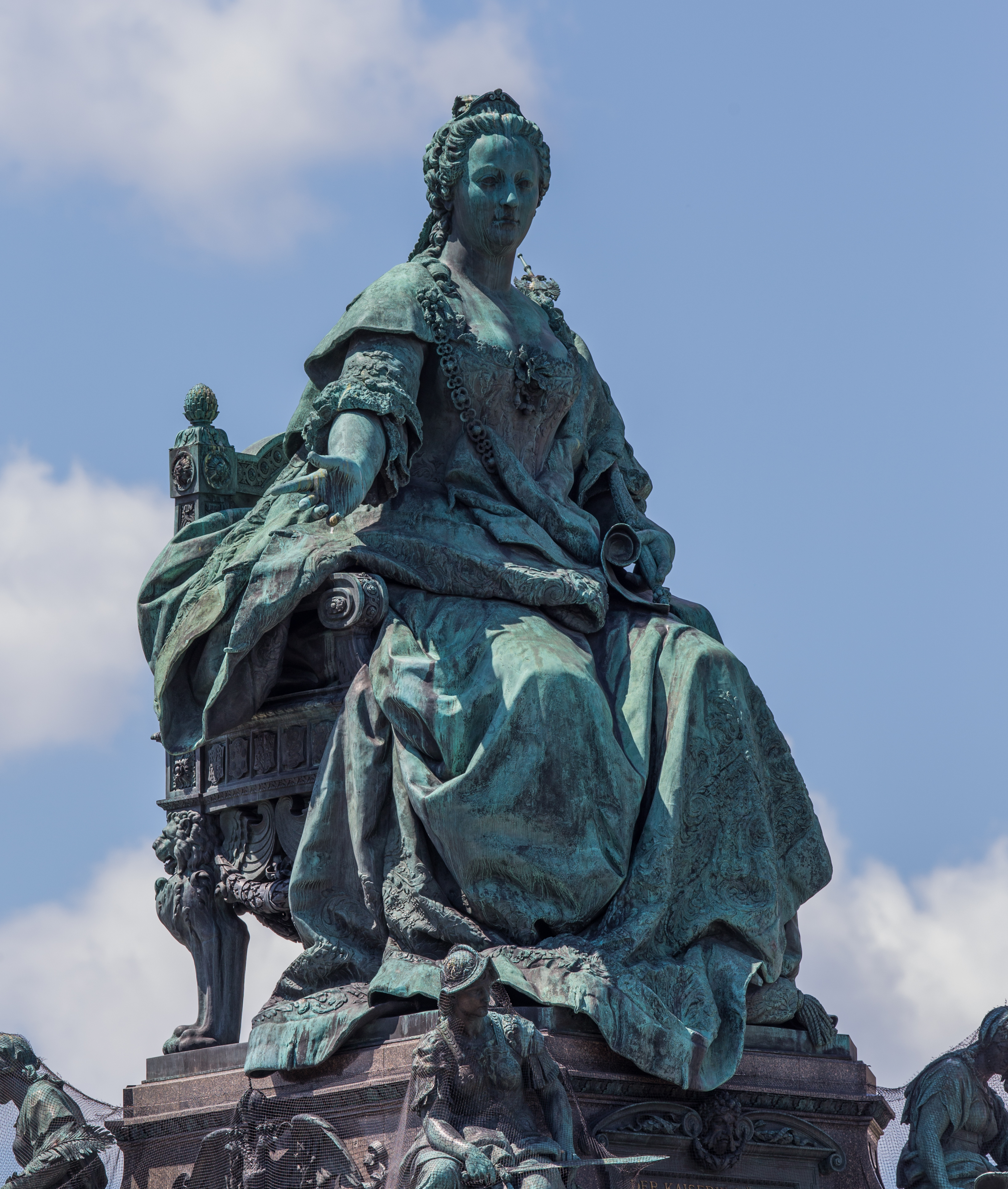
Maria-Theresia

The Maria Theresa Memorial is one of the most important monuments of the Habsburg monarchy in Vienna. It commemorates Empress Maria Theresa, who ruled the Habsburg monarchy from 1740 to 1780. The monument stands since 1888 on the Maria-Theresien-Platz between the Art History Museum, which opened in 1891, and the Natural History Museum, which opened in 1889.

== The Monument ==
In the 1860's, the Austrian Empire had been defeated in the Austro-Prussian War and the Third Italian War of Independence, followed by an economical crisis. The aim was to counteract these setbacks, with patriotic appeals to the splendor of the dual monarchy in the past.
The new ring road around Vienna's old town, which had been under construction since 1858 and opened in 1865, offered the opportunity to do so. Monuments to the two most important generals of the monarchy, Prince Eugene of Savoy and Archduke Charles, Duke of Teschen, were erected in 1860 and 1865 on the Heldenplatz in front of the Hofburg, which adjoins Maria-Theresien-Platz on the other side of the Ring Road. For the Maria-Theresien-Platz, it made sense to erect a monument to the historic mother of the country. Her prestige and popularity should radiate onto the current empire.

In 1874, the three sculptors Johannes Benk, Carl Kundmann and Kaspar von Zumbusch submitted designs for the execution of the sculptures. Emperor Franz Joseph I chose Zumbusch, who worked with his student Anton Brenek for around 13 years on the bronze sculptures, which weighed a total of 44 tons. Baron Karl von Hasenauer designed the architecture of the monument.

With the base, the monument covers an area of 632 m^{2} and is 19.36 m high, on top sits the figure of the Empress with a height of 6 m. The base and chain stand are made of Mauthausen granite from Enns in Upper Austria, the pedestal and base are made of brown hornblende granite from Petersburg-Jeschitz near Pilsen in Bohemia, the columns are made of serpentinite from Pfitsch near Sterzing in South Tyrol.

The content of the program for the monument came from Alfred von Arneth, Director of the Imperial House, Court and State Archives. The monarch herself sits on her throne in the center, in her left hand a scepter and the Pragmatic Sanction, the state and constitutional treaty that enabled her as a woman to rule in the Habsburg hereditary lands and in Hungary, greeting the people with her right hand. Four female figures sit on the cornice around the throne as allegorical embodiments of the 4 cardinal virtues of justice, strength, mildness and wisdom.

On each of the four sides of the plinth there is an arch field with a relief, and in front of it, a free-standing statue in a thematic context:

The Empress' Advisers

- as a statue: Wenzel Anton Kaunitz
- in relief, the background of which shows the Gloriette in the garden of Schönbrunn Palace:
  - Johann Christoph von Bartenstein,
  - Gundaker Thomas Starhemberg,
  - Florimond Claude von Mercy-Argenteau.

The Administrators

- as a statue: Friedrich Wilhelm von Haugwitz
- in relief, in a consultation room in the Hofburg:
  - Antal Grassalkovich I (represents the Kingdom of Hungary),
  - Samuel von Brukenthal (for Transylvania),
  - Paul Joseph von Riegger (scientist, constitutional lawyer),
  - Joseph von Sonnenfels (administrative reformer) represent the administration),
  - Karl Anton von Martini (university professor for constitutional law) .

The Military

- as a statue: Joseph Wenzel I, Prince of Liechtenstein
- in relief, in front of the castle in Wiener Neustadt, where the Theresian Military Academy was established in 1752:
  - Franz Moritz von Lacy,
  - Andreas Hadik von Futak,
  - Franz Leopold von Nádasdy.

Science and Art

- as a statue: doctor Gerard van Swieten
- in relief, in front of the Old University:
  - Joseph Hilarius Eckhel (numismatist),
  - György Pray (historian),
  - Christoph Willibald Gluck (composer),
  - Joseph Haydn (composer)
  - Wolfgang Amadeus Mozart, depicted as a child, .

On the diagonal axes, there are equestrian statues of four Field Marshals from the era of Maria Theresa surrounding the monument:

- Leopold Joseph von Daun (1705–1766),
- Ludwig Andreas von Khevenhüller (1683–1744),
- Ernst Gideon von Laudon (1717–1790),
- Otto Ferdinand von Abensperg und Traun (1677–1748).

A grand ceremony was held on 13 May 1888 to unveil the monument on the 171st birthday of the Empress. For this purpose, an imperial box was erected in a marquee in front of the monument, in which the entire imperial family took part in the ceremony. The Archbishop of Vienna, Cardinal Cölestin Josef Ganglbauer, celebrated a Te Deum with 20 other bishops. When the monument was unveiled, all the church bells in Vienna rang.
The monument is being completely renovated since October 2008.

== Sources ==
- Vienna Tourist Guide
- German Wikipedia
