= Paul Joseph von Riegger =

Austrian lawyer and teacher

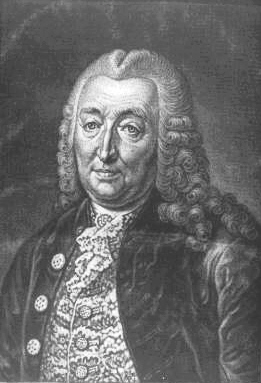
Paul Josef Riegger

Paul Joseph Riegger (from 1764 Ritter von Riegger), (Freiburg im Breisgau, 29 June 1705 – Vienna, 2 December 1775) was an Austrian lawyer and teacher of state church law.

== Biography ==
Paul Joseph Riegger taught from 1733 as a university professor in Innsbruck (natural and international law, German law), and from 1753 in Vienna at the University and Theresianum. For his services, he was elevated to the hereditary nobility on 8 January 1764 by Maria Theresa as Ritter von Riegger.

As an enlightener, and Maria Theresa's close advisor, he paved the way for the Josephine state reforms. He advocated a strict separation of State and Church law by restricting the previous rights of the church and subordinating them to state law. In doing so, he created the legal basis for the abolition of torture and witch trials.

He was the father of the lawyer and historian Josef Anton von Riegger (1742–1795).

Riegger is honored posthumously on the Maria Theresa Monument, which depicts the most important people from Maria Theresa's inner circle.

== Sources ==
- BLKÖ:Riegger, Paul Joseph Ritter von
- ADB:Riegger, Paul Josef von
- Deutsche Biographie
- Austria Forum
