= Miroslavské Knínice =

- Municipality
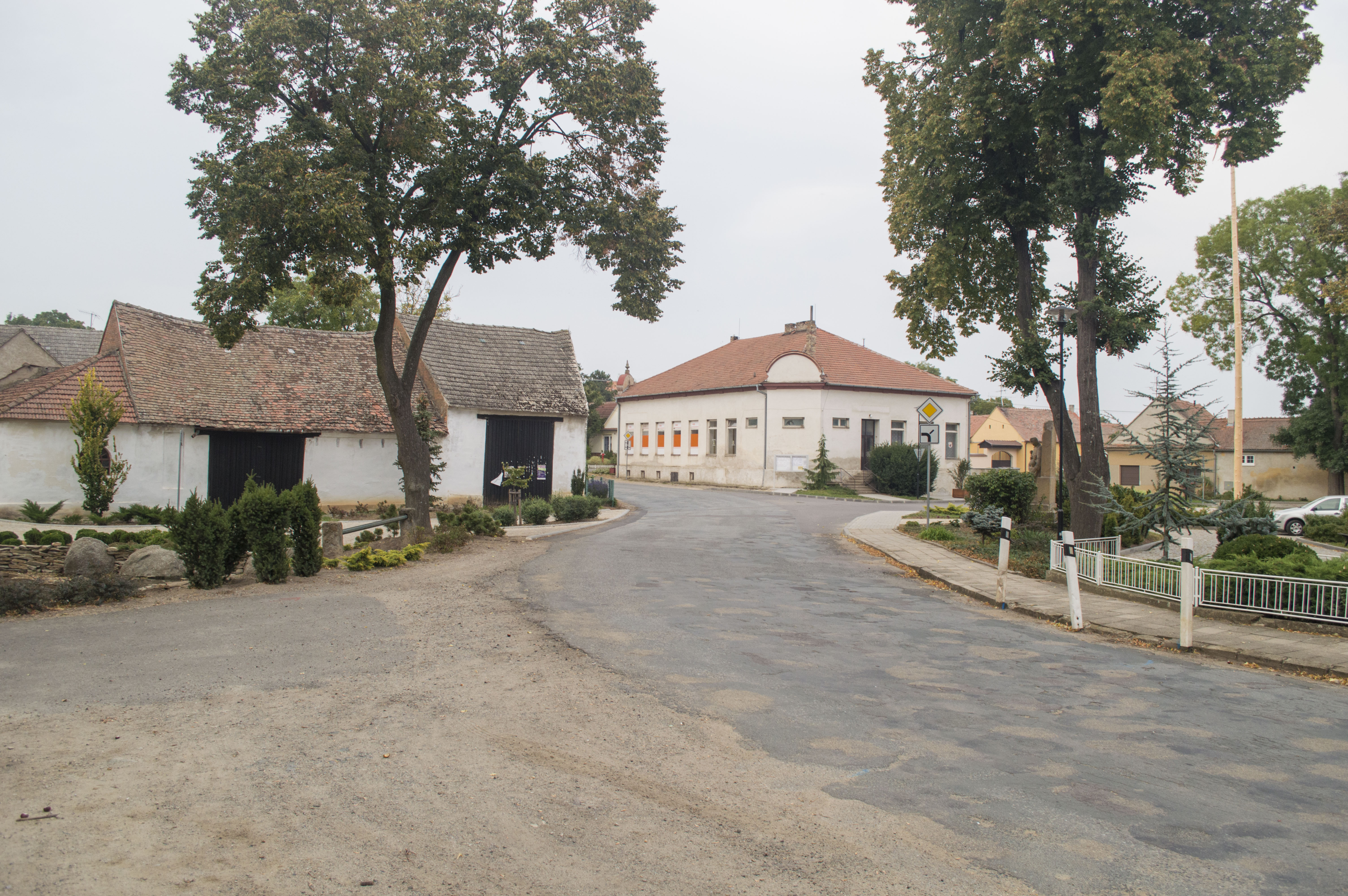
- Centre of Miroslavské Knínice

- Flag Coat of arms

- Location in the Czech Republic
- Coordinates: 48°58′40″N 16°19′20″E
- Country: Czech Republic
- Region: South Moravian
- District: Znojmo
- First mentioned: 1262

Area
  - Total: 8.64 km^{2} (3.34 sq mi)
- Elevation: 268 m (879 ft)

Population (2026-01-01)
  - Total: 346
  - Density: 40.0/km^{2} (104/sq mi)
- Time zone: UTC+1 (CET)
  - Summer (DST): UTC+2 (CEST)
- Postal code: 671 72
- Website: www.miroslavske-kninice.cz

Miroslavské Knínice (formerly Německé Knínice; German: Deutsch Knönitz) is a municipality and village in Znojmo District in the South Moravian Region of the Czech Republic. It has about 300 inhabitants.

== Geography ==
Miroslavské Knínice is located about 24 kilometres (15 mi) northeast of Znojmo and 30 km (19 mi) southwest of Brno. It lies in the Bobrava Highlands. The highest point is at 373 m (1,224 ft) above sea level.

== History ==
The first written mention of Knínice is from 1262, when Jaroslav of Knínice was documented as the owner of a fortress in Knínice. In 1503, Knínice was bought by Lords of Lomnice, who joined the village to the Náměšť estate. It was part of the estate until 1799 and shared its fate and owners. After the death of the last lord of Lomnice in 1563, the estate was inherited by the Zierotin family, who owned it until 1628. Other notable owners were Albrecht von Wallenstein (1628–1629), the Verdenberg family (1629–1733) and the Haugwitz family (1752–1799).

== Demographics ==
Historical population

Year	Pop.	±%
1869	615	—
1880	614	−0.2%
1890	617	+0.5%
1900	632	+2.4%
1910	641	+1.4%

Year	Pop.	±%
1921	734	+14.5%
1930	706	−3.8%
1950	583	−17.4%
1961	539	−7.5%
1970	484	−10.2%

Year	Pop.	±%
1980	440	−9.1%
1991	338	−23.2%
2001	330	−2.4%
2011	330	+0.0%
2021	327	−0.9%

Source: Censuses

== Economy ==
The municipality is known for its viticulture and wine-making. It lies in the Znojemská wine subregion. The first mention of vineyards in the village is from 1364.

== Transport ==
The railway line Brno–Hrušovany nad Jevišovkou passes through the municipal territory, but there is no train station.

== Sights ==
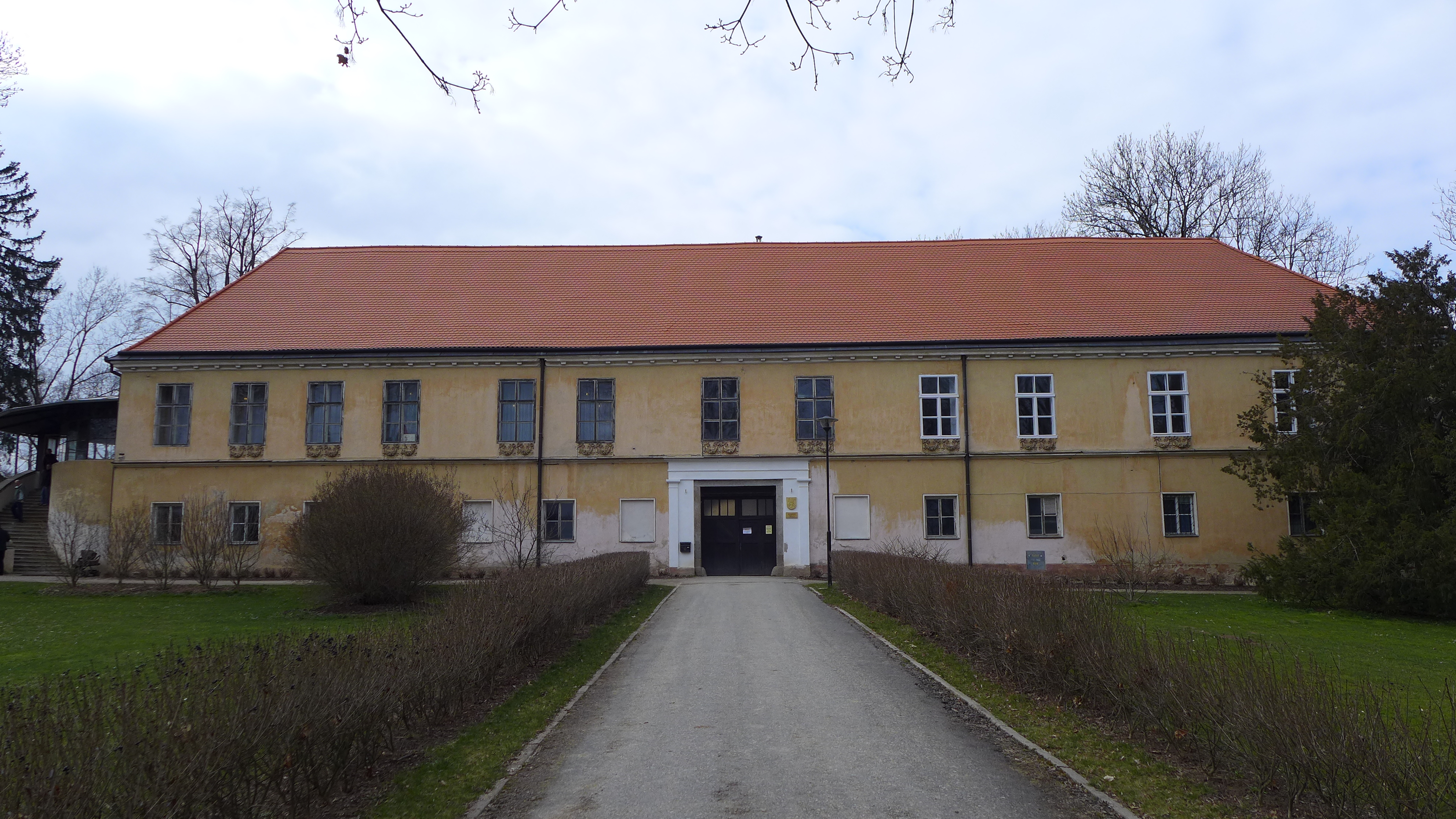
Miroslavské Knínice Castle

The castle is one of the main landmarks of the municipality. The old fortress was rebuilt into a Baroque castle, then in the early 19th century, it was completely rebuilt into its current Neoclassical form.

The Church of Saint Nicholas was originally an early Gothic building. In 1802, it was replaced by the current Neoclassical structure.

== Notable people ==
- Friedrich Wilhelm von Haugwitz (1702–1765), Austrian statesman; died here
