= Friedrich Wilhelm von Haugwitz =

Austrian politician (1702–1765)

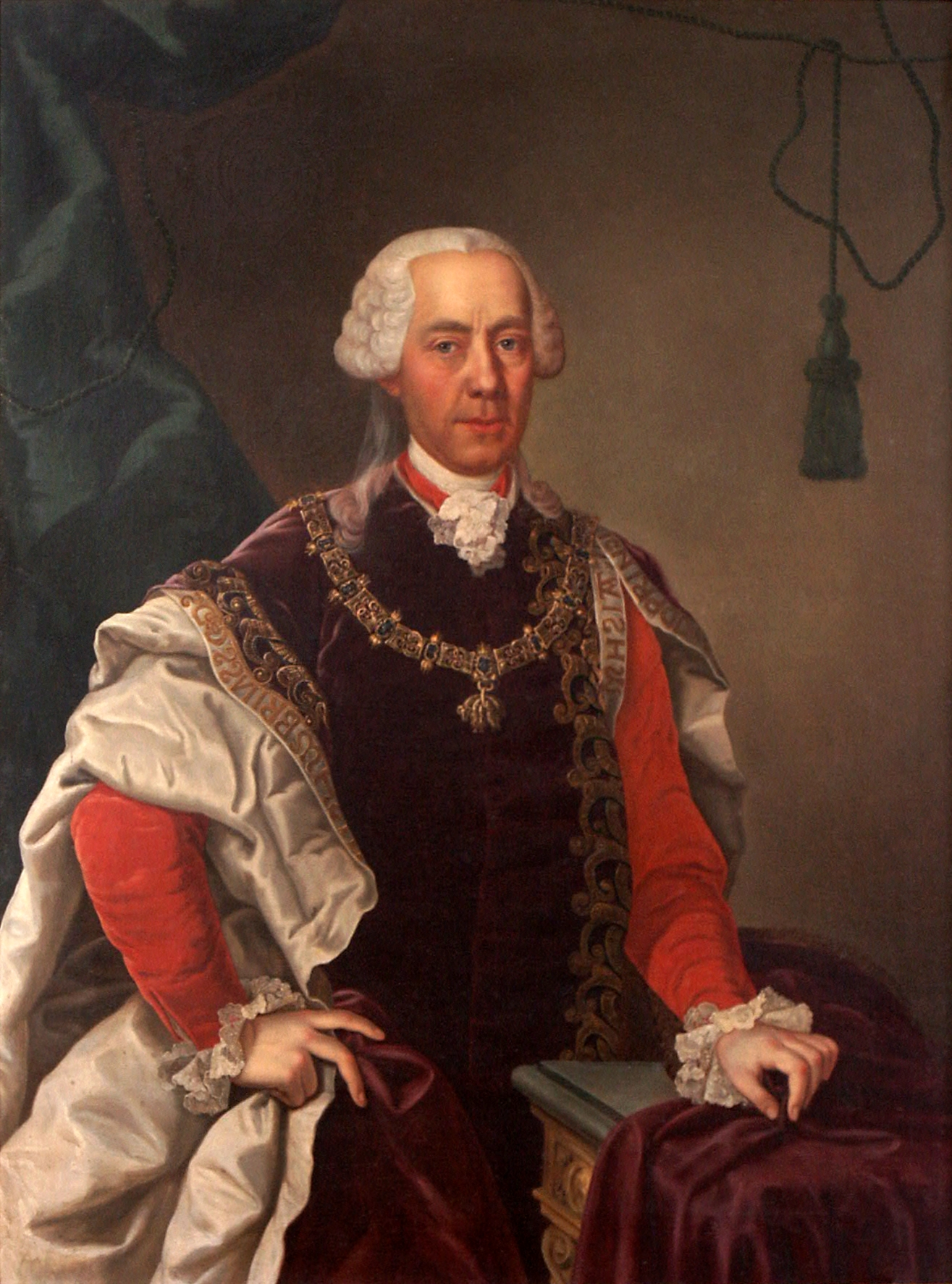

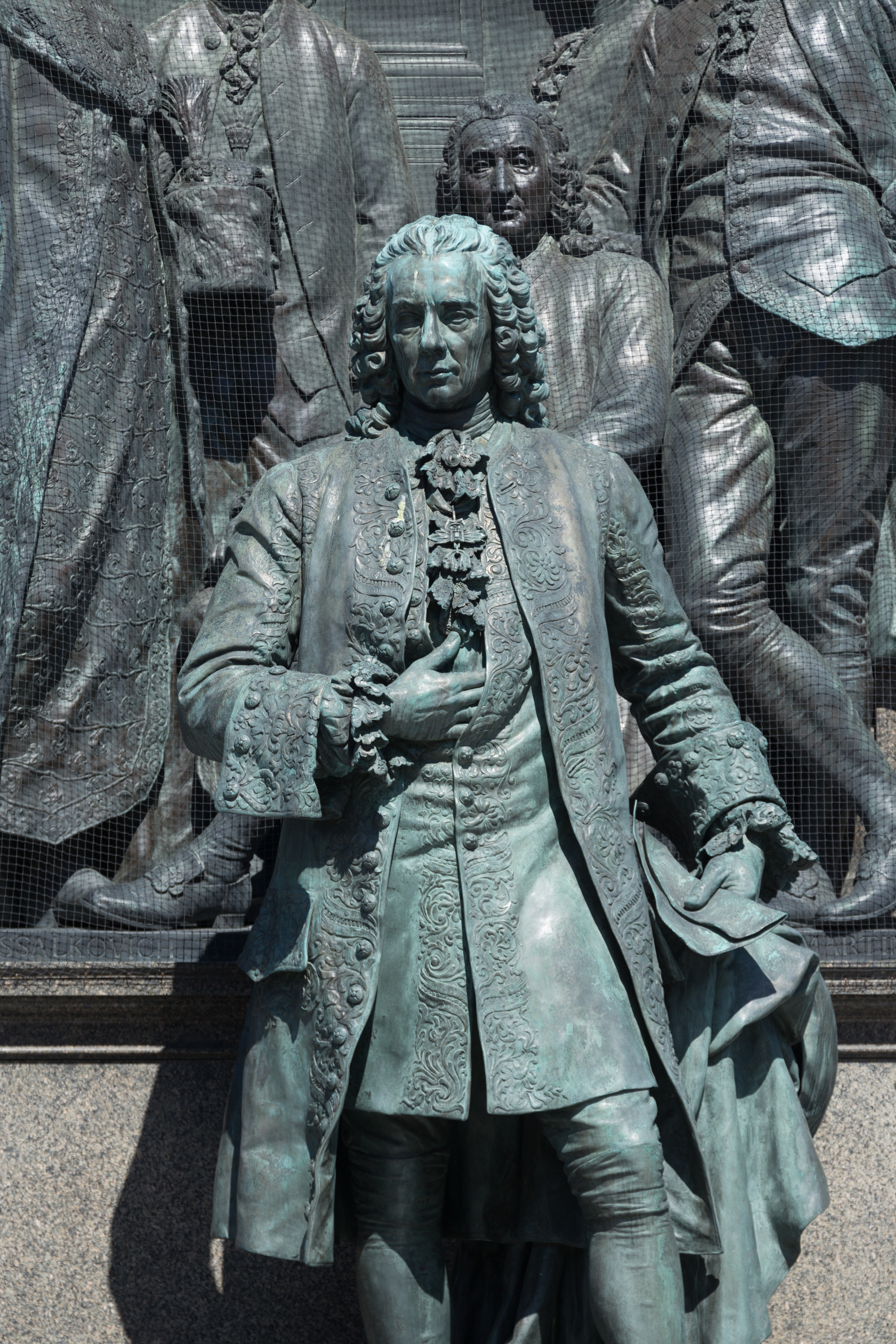
von Haugwitz as lead Administrator on the Maria-Theresia Memorial in Vienna

Friedrich Wilhelm Graf von Haugwitz (German: Friedrich Wilhelm Graf von Haugwitz), Czech: Fridrich Vilém Haugwitz; 11 December 1702, Saxony – 30 August 1765, Deutsch Knönitz (Czech: Miroslavské Knínice), Habsburg Moravia) was Supreme Chancellor of the United Court Chancery and the head of Directorium in publicis et cameralibus under Maria Theresa of Austria. He also served as one of the key advisors in instituting Maria Theresa's reforms. Haugwitz attempted to bring both centralization and economic reform to the Habsburg lands.

== Biography ==
In this position, Haugwitz presided over the hereditary lands of the Habsburg monarchy. After 1760, the chancery also dealt in the affairs of Bohemia. The Directorium in publicis et cameralibus became a centralized agency established with the advisement of Haugwitz to deal with matters such as “international administration and taxation, public safety, social welfare, education, church matters, mining and commerce”. It is clear from Maria Theresa's testament that Haugwitz was one of her most valued advisors. “He was truly sent to me by Providence, for to break the deadlock I needed such a man, honorable, disinterested, without predispositions, and with neither ambition nor hangers-on, who supported what was good because he saw it to be good…”

Haugwitz’ father was a general in the service of Saxony. As a young man’ Haugwitz went to Rome and then entered the civil service in Silesia. This job came to an end when Frederick II invaded Silesia and Haugwitz escaped to Vienna. Maria Theresa sent him to the remaining part of Silesia under her rule to get the finances in order. Haugwitz, as a student of the Austrian cameralist, Wilhelm von Schröder de, learned hostility towards the wealthy estates. Haugwitz was also an admirer of the reforms and new administration in the Prussian province of Silesia. He intended to change economic and administrative institutions through compartmentalization of government functions, education, centralization of the economy and provision of economic information to the monarchy.

In terms of compartmentalization, Haugwitz instituted a separation of judicial matters from political and fiscal matters by instituting a new High Court (Oberste Justizstelle). Regional courts functioned directly beneath the Empress with each departmental chief supervising his own affairs.

Haugwitz also focused on another important initiative to bring modern economic thought to students. Maria Theresa had established the Theresianum to train noble children for civil service. Through this institution, Haugwitz planned to bring about economic modernization. To catalyze this modernization and establish Vienna as a place of economic discourse, Haugwitz brought Johann Heinrich Gottlob Justi to Vienna, first to teach German as the language of administration and later to train students according to both German Kameralism and modern economic theories and practices. As both a former soldier in Prussia and a Protestant, Justi was not well liked in Vienna. Because of this mistrust, Justi lacked the access to pertinent economic data required to execute his theories. Society was also not prepared for modern economic thought because of the traditionally Jesuit nature of scholarship and the division of the Habsburg economy into various regional and local economies.

In 1746, under the direction of Haugwitz, in an attempt to bring about economic centralization, the Directorium was established as a central agency to supervise the lands in the monarchy and make recommendations about economic improvements. In 1749, the government established Representationen und Cammern as local offices of the Directorium chiefly as mechanisms for supervising tax policy.

Because of this economic centralization, Haugwitz provided Emperor Joseph II with an unprecedented amount of information about the economies of the states over which he would reign. As part of Joseph II's education, he received an extensive overview of the economic makeup of each state. Such a report was unprecedented because it would traditionally have been viewed as an intrusion in the affairs normally reserved to the estates. All of these reforms helped to bring about the eventual peak of mercantilism in the 1760s.

Military reforms complemented Haugwitz's economic initiatives. Due to his belief in the need for “immediate supremacy of the sovereign over the army, and the maintenance of an adequate body of troops even in time of peace,” Haugwitz contributed to military reform in both funding and the development of a standing army.

To protect the monarchy, Haugwitz recommended a standing army of 108,000 supported by contributions by the estates of 14 million gulden. To avoid the previous issues in estates' withholding of contributions, or the tedious process of frequent appeals to the estates, Haugwitz instituted the Ten Years’ Recess. Under this program, despite the resistance of the estates, the estates would guarantee payment for ten years. This period abolished the previous fluctuations in finances. Previously, when taxes were levied from the estates, the estates disagreed amongst themselves over the amount levied, divided the sum among the various estates, collected taxes from the peasantry, deducted from these taxes and then distributed the remainder to the monarchy. In this reform, Representationen und Cammern collected the taxes in order that the greatest portion of the levy would be distributed to the monarchy.

In addition to these military finance reforms, Haugwitz instituted reforms within the military. A policy quite close to conscription was established. Uniform dress was required of soldiers in order to foster national spirit. Haugwitz advocated the usage of Prussian fighting tactics. A training school was founded to train officers in these tactics.

Despite the large-scale nature and depth of Haugwitz's reforms, their efficacy was not as great as he had intended. Haugwitz's attempt to transform the monarchy from a “feudal aristocracy” to a “well-organised-despotism” was incomplete. (Franck p. 190) The superior court system that established local judges, while initially an attempt at both centralization and organization brought about the opposite due to the tremendous autonomy of each departmental chief. Furthermore, the reforms had limited scope, because they were not aimed at nor did they have any effect on Hungary, Transylvania, Austria, the Netherlands, or Lombardy.

The beginning of the Seven Years’ War in 1757 thwarted the development of many of the reforms. In false defense of his failing policies, Haugwitz argued that the reforms “were only for peacetime”. Eventually, Haugwitz's Directorium was stripped of its military and financial functions and renamed the Bohemian and Austrian Court Chancellery. Most power now became centered in the Council of State headed by Wenzel Anton Graf Kaunitz. Kaunitz, a historic foe of Haugwitz, replaced him in instituting policies. However, Haugwitz's policies would have an effect throughout the reign of Maria Theresa and later in the reign of Joseph II.

Early in his career the composer Joseph Haydn was briefly in Count Haugwitz's employ, playing the organ in the Bohemian Chancellery chapel at the Judenplatz.

== Death ==
In the summer of 1765, he moved to one of his castles in Miroslavské Knínice, where, due to dysentery, his health worsened. He died on 30 August 1765. His body was taken to Náměšť nad Oslavou, where he was buried on 1 September 1765 in the crypt of the Church of St. John the Baptist. Later, his remains, along with those of his wife, were moved, on 19 February 1768, to a crypt in the Capuchin church near the castle in Náměšť.
