= Prince Eugene of Savoy =

Military commander in the service of Austria (1663–1736)

Eugene of Savoy
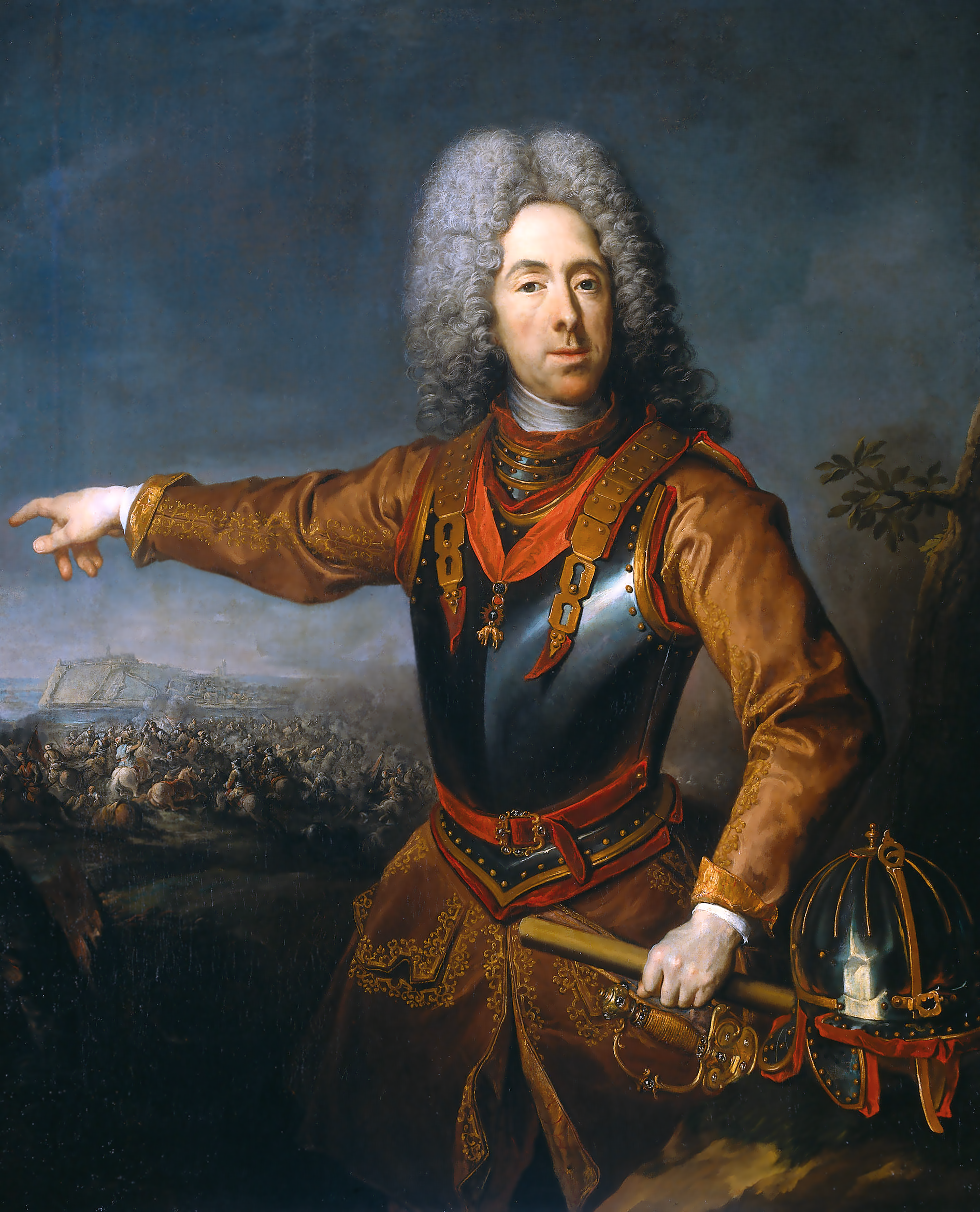
- Portrait of Eugene of Savoy by Jacob van Schuppen, 1718
- Born: 18 October 1663; Hôtel de Soissons, Paris, France
- Died: 21 April 1736 (aged 72); Vienna, Austria
- Burial: St. Stephen's Cathedral, Vienna
- House: Savoy-Carignano
- Father: Eugene Maurice of Savoy
- Mother: Olympia Mancini
- Military career
- Allegiance: Holy Roman Empire
- Service years: 1683-1735
- Rank: Feldmarschall
- Conflicts: See list: Great Turkish War; Battle of Vienna; Siege of Buda (1684); Siege of Buda (1686); Battle of Mohács; Siege of Belgrade; Battle of Zenta; Sack of Sarajevo; Nine Years' War; Siege of Mainz (1689); Battle of Staffarda; War of the Spanish Succession; Battle of Carpi; Battle of Chiari; Battle of Cremona; Battle of Luzzara; Battle of Blenheim; Battle of Cassano; Siege of Turin; Battle of Toulon; Battle of Oudenarde; Siege of Lille; Crossing of the Scheldt; Battle of Malplaquet; Battle of Denain; Rhine campaign (1713); Austro-Turkish War; Battle of Petrovaradin; Siege of Temeşvar; Battle of Belgrade; War of the Polish Succession; Siege of Philippsburg

Prince Eugene Francis of Savoy-Carignano (Note: French: Eugène François; German: Eugen Franz; Italian: Eugenio Francesco) (18 October 1663 – 21 April 1736), better known as Prince Eugene, (Note: German: Prinz Eugen) was a distinguished feldmarschall in the Army of the Holy Roman Empire and of the Austrian Habsburg dynasty during the 17th and 18th centuries. Renowned as one of the greatest military commanders of his era, Prince Eugene also rose to the highest offices of state at the Imperial court in Vienna, spending six decades in the service of three emperors.

Born in Paris, to the son of a French count and a niece of Cardinal Mazarin, Eugene was raised at the court of King Louis XIV. Initially destined for the priesthood as the youngest son of a noble family, he chose to pursue a military career at 19. Due to his poor physique and possibly a scandal involving his mother, Louis XIV denied him a commission in the French Royal Army and forbade him from enlisting elsewhere. Embittered, Eugene fled France and entered the service of Emperor Leopold I, cousin and rival of Louis XIV, in whose service his elder brother Louis Julius had just fallen in battle.

At 20, Prince Eugene of Savoy distinguished himself during the Ottoman siege of Vienna in 1683. Commanding troops at Buda (1686; now Budapest) and Belgrade (1688), he became a field marshal by age 25. In the Nine Years' War, he fought alongside his distant cousin, the Duke of Savoy. As commander-in-chief in Hungary, Eugene's decisive victory at the Battle of Zenta (1697) ended the Ottoman threat for nearly 20 years. During the War of the Spanish Succession (1701–1714), he served Emperor Leopold I, achieving victories in Italy and forming a crucial partnership with the Duke of Marlborough, securing wins at Blenheim (1704), Oudenaarde (1708), and Malplaquet (1709). His success continued in Italy, notably at Turin (1706). Renewed Austro-Turkish conflicts saw Eugene triumph at Petrovaradin (1716) and Belgrade (1717), solidifying his legacy as one of Europe's greatest military commanders and securing peace in 1718.

Throughout the late 1720s, Eugene's diplomatic skills secured powerful allies for the Emperor in dynastic struggles with the Bourbon powers. Physically and mentally fragile in his later years, Eugene saw less success as commander-in-chief during the War of the Polish Succession (1733–1735). Despite his opposition to the conflict, he loyally led a defensive campaign, preventing enemy invasion of Bavaria. During his peaceful years, Eugene accumulated a vast collection of art and literature and corresponded with contemporary artists, scientists, and philosophers. His architectural legacy includes Baroque palaces like the Belvedere in Vienna. He died on 21 April 1736, aged 72.

== Early years (1663–1699) ==
=== Birth and family ===
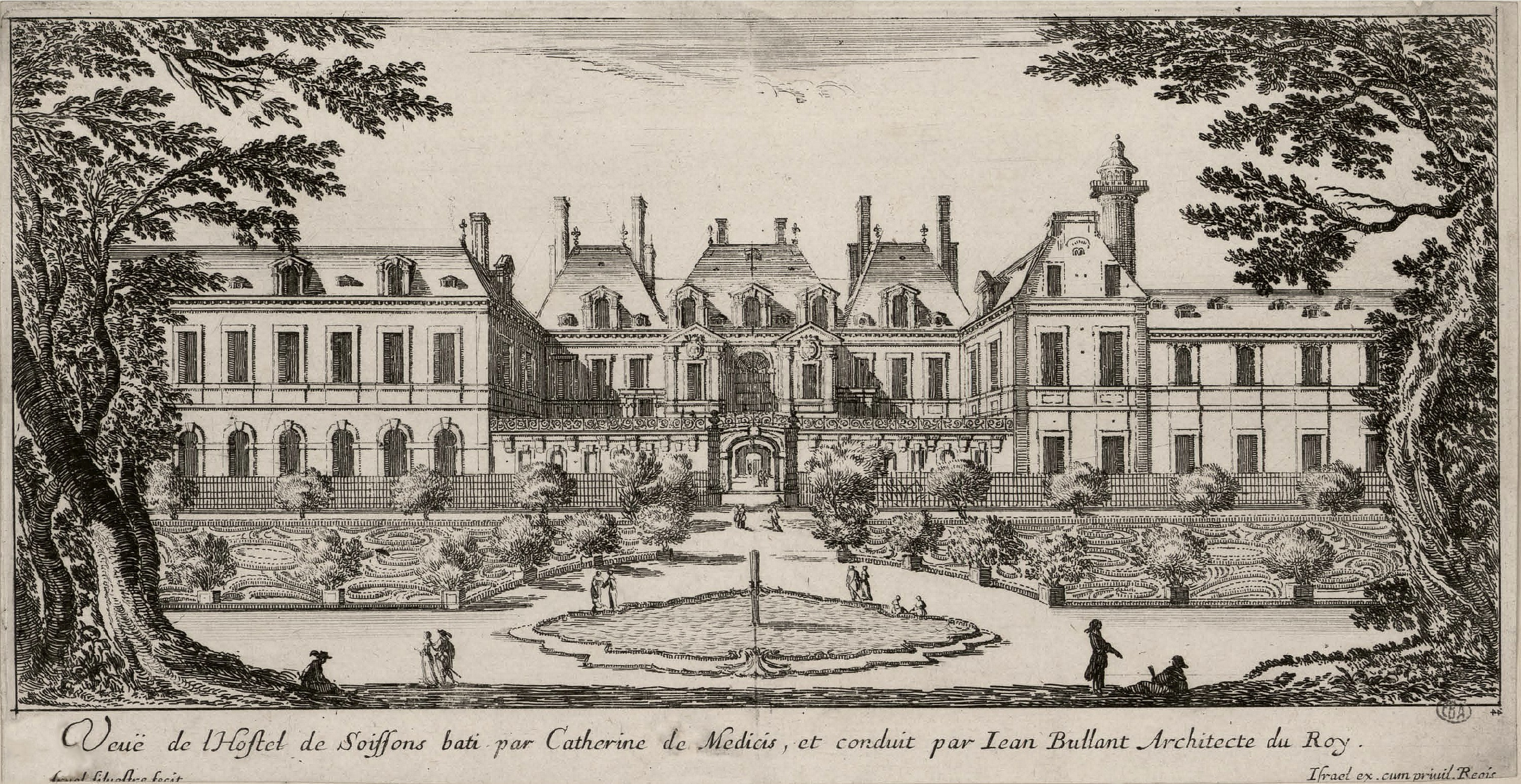
Hôtel de Soissons, Eugene's birthplace. Engraving by Israel Silvestre, c. 1650.

Prince Eugene was born at the Hôtel de Soissons in Paris on 18 October 1663. His mother, Olympia Mancini, was one of Cardinal Mazarin's nieces whom the Cardinal had brought to Paris from Rome in 1647 to further his (and, to a lesser extent, their) ambitions. The Mancinis were raised at the Palais-Royal along with the young Louis XIV, with whom Olympia formed an intimate relationship. Yet to her great disappointment, her chance to become queen passed by, and in 1657 she married Eugene Maurice, Count of Soissons, Count of Dreux and Prince of Savoy. Together they had had five sons (Eugene being the youngest) and three daughters, but neither parent spent much time with the children: the father, a French general officer, spent much of his time away campaigning, while Olympia's passion for court intrigue meant the children received little attention from her.

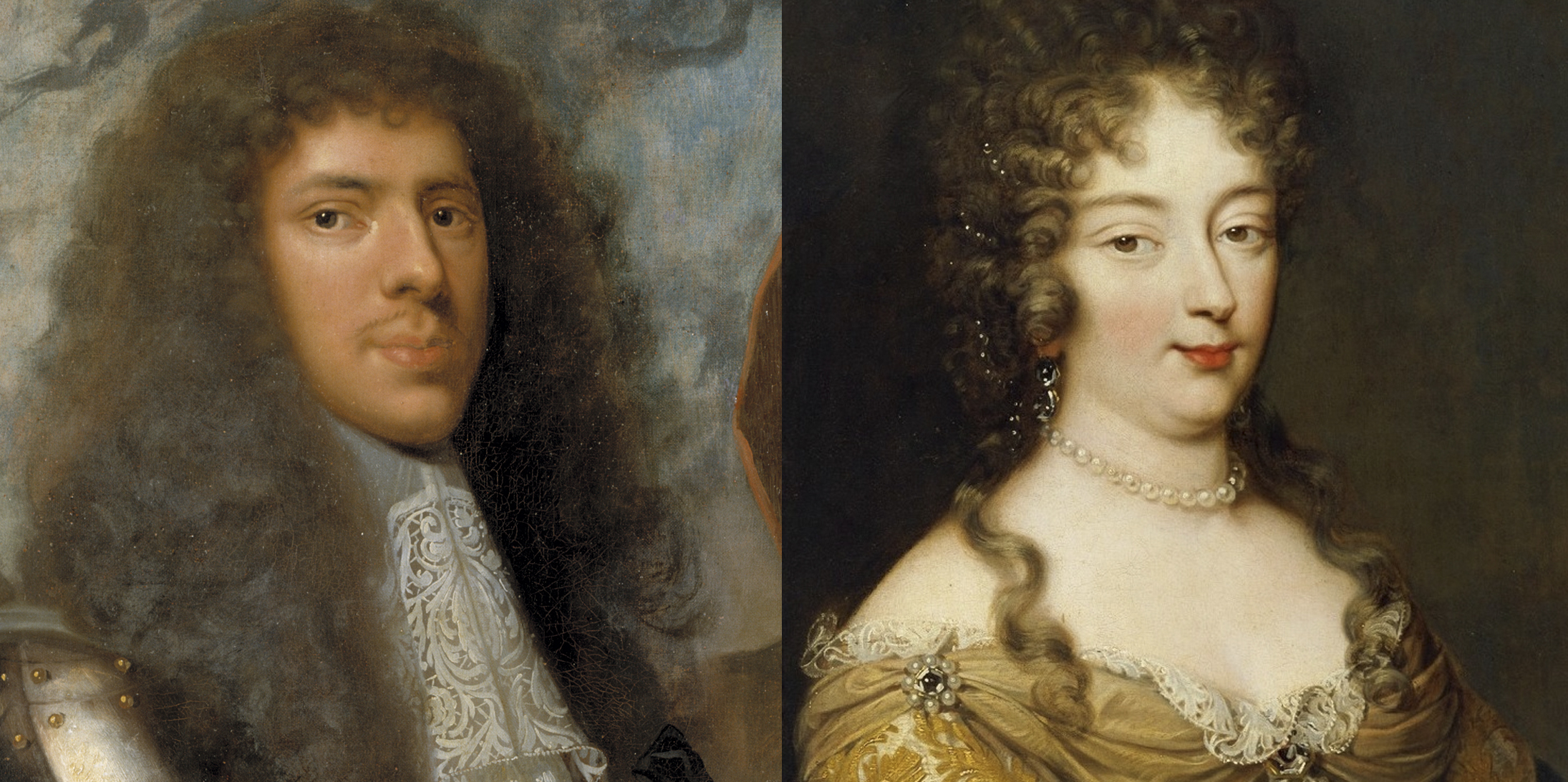
Eugene Maurice and Olympia Mancini, Count and Countess of Soissons, parents of Prince Eugene

The King remained strongly attached to Olympia, so much so that many believed them to be lovers; but her scheming eventually led to her downfall. After falling out of favour at court, Olympia turned to Catherine Deshayes (known as La Voisin), and to the arts of black magic and astrology. It proved a fatal relationship. She became embroiled in the "Affaire des poisons"; suspicions abounded of her involvement in her husband's premature death in 1673, and even implicated her in a plot to kill the King himself. Whatever the truth, Olympia, rather than face trial, subsequently fled France for Brussels in January 1680, leaving Eugene in the care of his paternal grandmother, Marie de Bourbon, Countess of Soissons, and of his paternal aunt, Louise Christine of Savoy, Princess of Baden consort to the heir apparent Ferdinand Maximilian, and mother of Prince Louis of Baden.

=== Youth ===
From the age of ten, Eugene had been brought up for a career in the church, in line with expectations for the youngest son. Elizabeth Charlotte, Duchess of Orléans, known for her satirical letters and her hostility toward those who opposed the French crown, described him unfavourably, writing that he was "never good looking" and criticising his features. In the same retrospective commentary, she claimed he had lived a life of "debauchery" and associated with what she described as an "effeminate” circle", including figures such as the Abbé de Choisy. These remarks were made decades later, after Eugene had entered the service of France’s principal enemy, the Habsburgs.

In February 1683, to the surprise of his family, the 19-year-old Eugene declared his intention of joining the army. Eugene applied directly to Louis XIV for command of a company in French service, but the King who was said to dislike Eugene's appearance and who had shown no compassion for Olympia's children since her disgrace—refused him out of hand. "The request was modest, not so the petitioner", he remarked. "No one else ever presumed to stare me out so insolently." Whatever the case, Louis XIV's choice would cost him dearly twenty years later, for it would be precisely Eugene, in collaboration with the Duke of Marlborough, who would defeat the French army at Blenheim, a decisive battle which checked French military supremacy and political power.

Denied a military career in France, Eugene decided to seek service abroad. One of Eugene's brothers, Louis Julius, had entered Imperial service the previous year, but he had been immediately killed fighting the Ottoman Empire in 1683. As soon as news of his death reached Paris, Eugene decided to immediately travel to Austria in the hope of taking over his brother's command. It was not an unnatural decision: his first cousin, Louis of Baden, was already a leading general in the Imperial army, as was a more distant cousin, Maximilian II Emanuel, Elector of Bavaria. 13 days after his brother's death, on the night of 26 July 1683, Eugene left Paris and headed east. Some accounts state that Eugene travelled in disguise, reportedly dressed as a woman, and was accompanied by his cousin Louis Armand I, Prince of Conti. Years later, in his memoirs, Eugene recalled his early years in France:

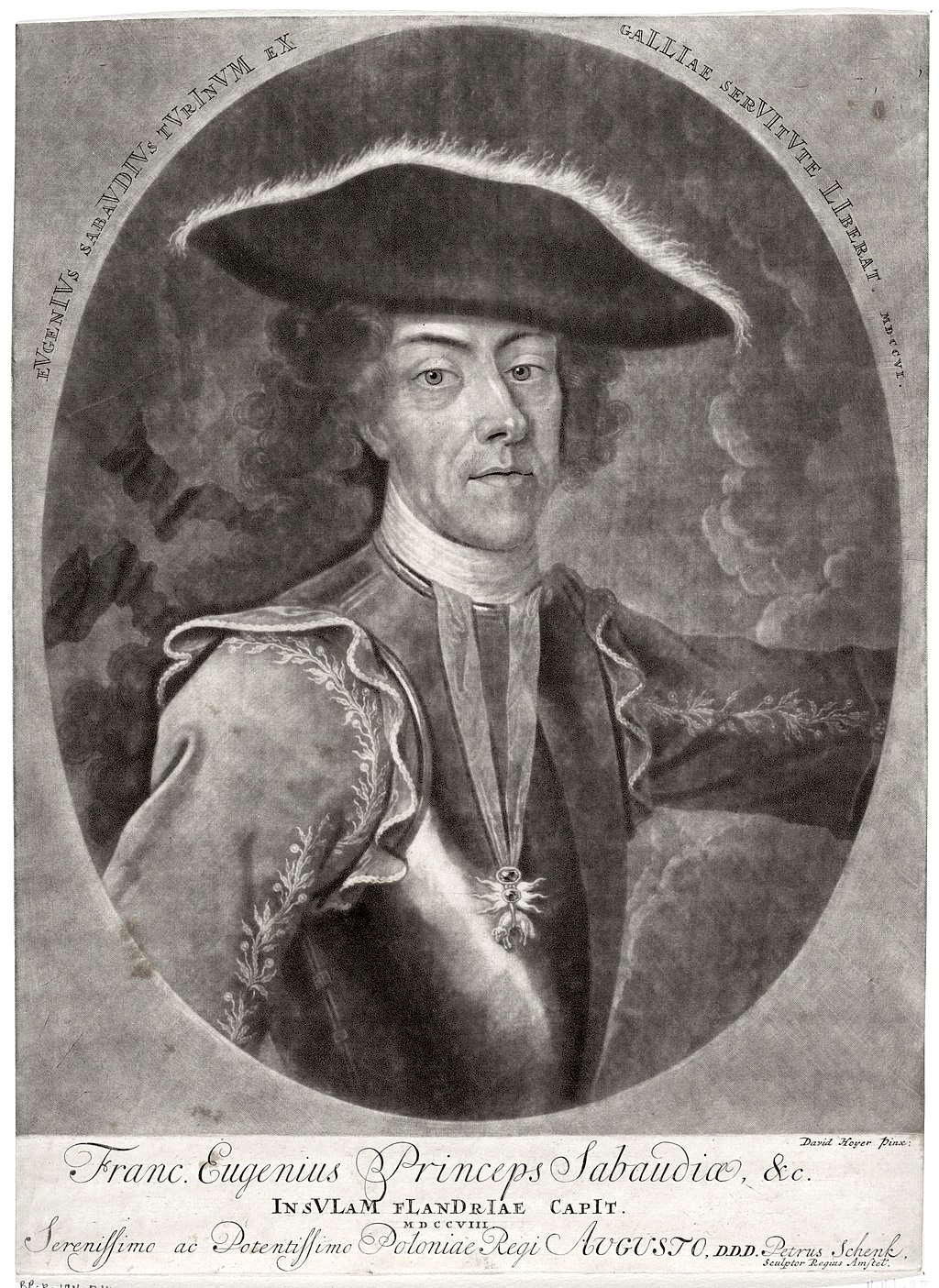
Prince Eugene as a young General by German painter David Hoyer

Some future historians, good or bad, will perhaps take the trouble to enter into the details of my youth, of which, I scarcely recollect anything. They will certainly speak of my mother; somewhat too intriguing indeed, driven from the court, exiled from Paris, and suspected, I believe, of sorcery, by people who were not, themselves, very great conjurors. They will tell, how I was born in France and how I quitted it, my heart swelling with enmity against Louis XIV who refused me a company of horse, because, said he, I was of too delicate a constitution; and an abbey, because he thought, (from I know not what evil discourse respecting me, or what false anecdotes current in the gallery of Versailles,) that I was more formed for pleasure than for piety. There is not a Huguenot, expelled by the revocation of the edict of Nantz who hated him more than I did. Therefore when Louvois, hearing of my departure, said, "So much the better; he will never return into this country again,"— I swore never to enter it but with arms in my hands. I HAVE KEPT MY WORD.
I have penetrated into it on many sides, and it is not my fault that I have not gone further. But for the English, I had given law in the capital of the Grand Monarque, and made his MAINTENON shut herself up in a convent for life.

— Memoirs of Prince Eugene of Savoy

=== Great Turkish War ===
By May 1683, the Ottoman threat to Emperor Leopold I's capital, Vienna, was very evident. The Grand Vizier, Kara Mustafa Pasha—encouraged by Imre Thököly's Magyar rebellion—had invaded Hungary with between 100,000 and 200,000 men; within two months approximately 90,000 were beneath Vienna's walls. With the 'Turks at the gates', the Emperor fled for the safe refuge of Passau up the Danube. It was at Leopold I's camp that Eugene arrived in mid-August.

Although Eugene was not of Austrian extraction, he did have Habsburg antecedents. His grandfather, Thomas Francis, founder of the Carignano line of the House of Savoy, was the son of Catherine Michaela of Spain—a daughter of Philip II of Spain—and the great-grandson of the Emperor Charles V. But of more immediate consequence to Leopold I was the fact that Eugene was a relative of Victor Amadeus II, the Duke of Savoy, a connection that the Emperor hoped might prove useful in any future confrontation with France. These ties, together with his ascetic manner and appearance (a positive advantage to him at the sombre court of Leopold I), ensured the refugee from the hated French king a warm welcome at Passau, and a position in Imperial service. Though French was his favoured language, he communicated with Leopold in Italian, as the Emperor (though he knew it perfectly) disliked French. But Eugene also had a reasonable command of German, which he understood very easily, something that helped him much in the military.

I will devote all my strength, all my courage, and if need be, my last drop of blood, to the service of your Imperial Majesty.

— Prince Eugene to Leopold I

Battle of Vienna, 12 September 1683

Eugene had no doubt as to where his new allegiance lay, and this loyalty was immediately put to the test. By September, the Imperial forces under the Duke of Lorraine, together with a powerful Polish army under King John III Sobieski, were poised to strike the Sultan's army. On the morning of 12 September, the Christian forces drew up in line of battle on the south-eastern slopes of the Vienna Woods, looking down on the massed enemy camp. The day-long Battle of Vienna resulted in the lifting of the 60-day siege, and the Sultan's forces were routed. Serving under Baden, as a twenty-year-old volunteer, Eugene distinguished himself in the battle, earning commendation from Lorraine and the Emperor; he later received the nomination for the colonelcy and was awarded the Kufstein regiment of dragoons by Leopold I.

==== Holy League ====
In March 1684, Leopold I formed the Holy League with Poland and Venice to counter the Ottoman threat. For the next two years, Eugene continued to perform with distinction on campaign and establish himself as a dedicated, professional soldier; by the end of 1685, still only 22 years old, he was made a Major-General. Little is known of Eugene's life during these early campaigns. Contemporary observers make only passing comments of his actions, and his own surviving correspondence, largely to his cousin Victor Amadeus, are typically reticent about his own feelings and experiences. Nevertheless, it is clear that Baden was impressed with Eugene's qualities—"This young man will, with time, occupy the place of those whom the world regards as great leaders of armies." It is also known that many Greeks served in Eugene's army, some in active military roles and others as scouts or in supply duties. Eugene was also described as an influential advocate for the Greek community.

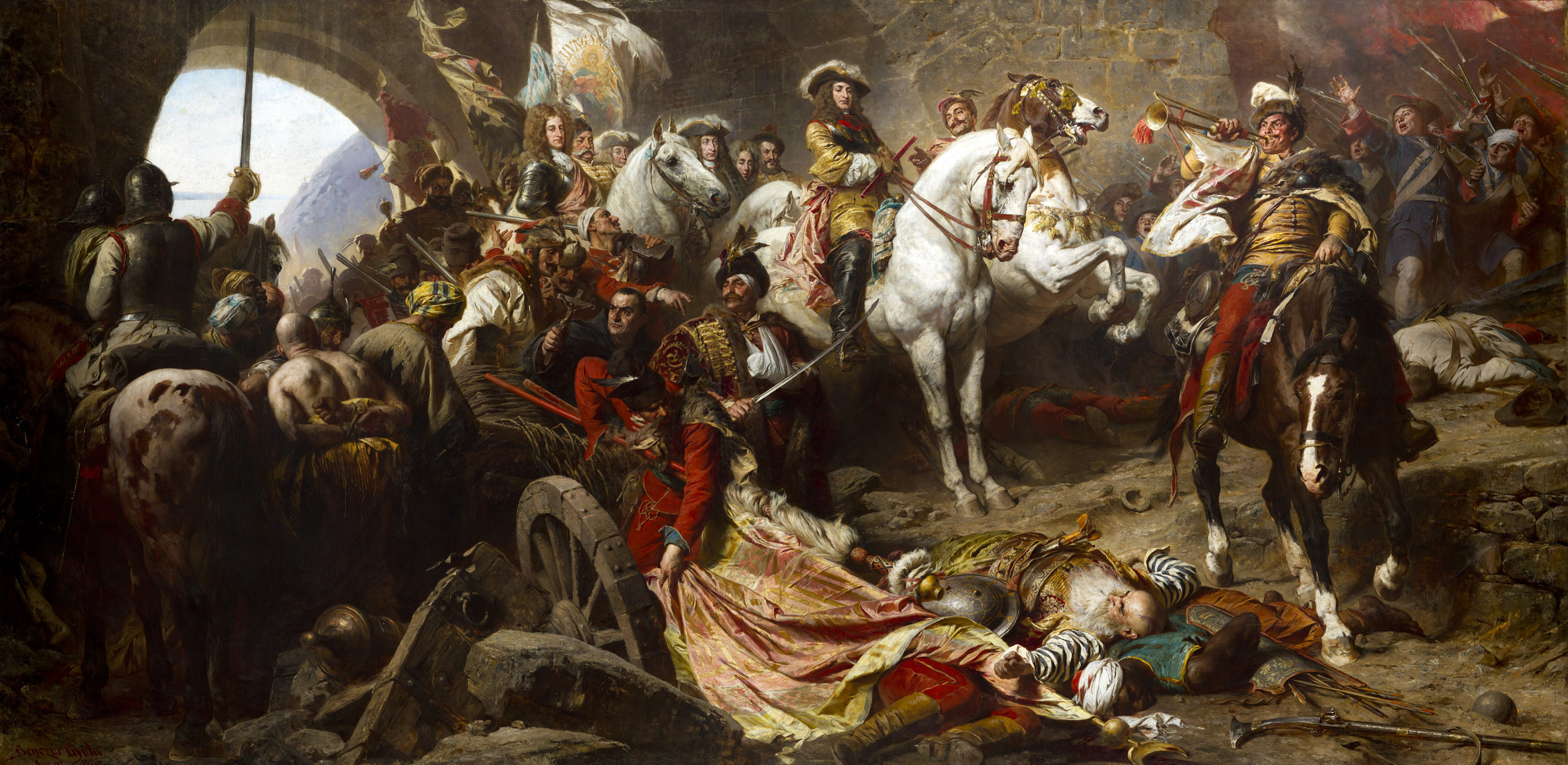
1896 painting of the recapture of Buda Castle in 1686 (with Eugene on the second white horse from the right) by Gyula Benczúr

In June 1686, the Duke of Lorraine besieged Buda (Budapest), the centre of Ottoman Hungary and the old royal capital. After resisting for 78 days, the city fell on 2 September, and Turkish resistance collapsed throughout the region as far away as Transylvania and Serbia. Further success followed in 1687, where, commanding a cavalry brigade, Eugene made an important contribution to the victory at the Battle of Mohács on 12 August. Such was the scale of their defeat that the Ottoman army mutinied—a revolt which spread to Constantinople. The Grand Vizier, Sarı Süleyman Pasha, was executed and Sultan Mehmed IV, deposed. Once again, Eugene's courage earned him recognition from his superiors, who granted him the honour of personally conveying the news of victory to the Emperor in Vienna. For his services, Eugene was promoted to Lieutenant-General in November 1687. He was also gaining wider recognition. King Charles II of Spain bestowed upon him the Order of the Golden Fleece, while his cousin, Victor Amadeus, provided him with money and two profitable abbeys in Piedmont. Eugene's military career suffered a temporary setback in 1688 when, on 6 September, the Prince suffered a severe wound to his knee by a musket ball during the Siege of Belgrade, and did not return to active service until January 1689.

==== Interlude in the west: Nine Years' War ====
Just as Belgrade was falling to Imperial forces under Max Emmanuel in the east, French troops in the west were crossing the Rhine into the Holy Roman Empire. Louis XIV had hoped that a show of force would lead to a quick resolution to his dynastic and territorial disputes with the princes of the Empire along his eastern border, but his intimidatory moves only strengthened German resolve, and in May 1689, Leopold I and the Dutch signed an offensive compact aimed at repelling French aggression.

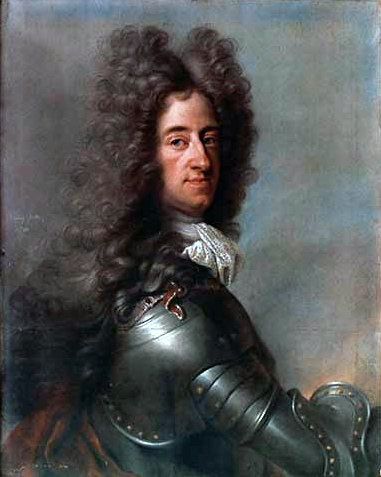
Max Emanuel, Elector of Bavaria, Eugene's early mentor before becoming his opponent in the War of the Spanish Succession, painting by Joseph Vivien

The Nine Years' War was professionally and personally frustrating for the prince. Initially fighting on the Rhine with Max Emmanuel—receiving a slight head wound at the Siege of Mainz in 1689—Eugene subsequently transferred himself to Piedmont after Victor Amadeus joined the Alliance against France in 1690. Promoted to general of cavalry, he arrived in Turin with his friend the Prince of Commercy; but it proved an inauspicious start. Against Eugene's advice, Amadeus insisted on engaging the French at Staffarda and suffered a serious defeat—only Eugene's handling of the Savoyard cavalry in retreat saved his cousin from disaster. Eugene remained unimpressed with the men and their commanders throughout the war in Italy. "The enemy would long ago have been beaten", he wrote to Vienna, "if everyone had done their duty." So contemptuous was he of the Imperial commander, Count Carafa, he threatened to leave Imperial service.

In Vienna, Eugene's attitude was dismissed as the arrogance of a young upstart, but so impressed was the Emperor by his passion for the Imperial cause, he promoted him to Field-Marshal in 1693. When Carafa's replacement, Count Caprara, was himself transferred in 1694, it seemed that Eugene's chance for command and decisive action had finally arrived. But Amadeus, doubtful of victory and now more fearful of Habsburg influence in Italy than he was of French, had begun secret dealings with Louis XIV aimed at extricating himself from the war. By 1696, the deal was done, and Amadeus transferred his troops and his loyalty to the enemy. Eugene was never to fully trust his cousin again; although he continued to pay due reverence to the Duke as head of his family, their relationship would forever after remain strained.

Military honours in Italy undoubtedly belonged to the French commander Marshal Catinat, but Eugene, the one Allied general determined on action and decisive results, did well to emerge from the Nine Years' War with an enhanced reputation. With the signing of the Treaty of Ryswick in September/October 1697, the desultory war in the west was finally brought to an inconclusive end, and Leopold I could once again devote all his martial energies into defeating the Ottoman Turks in the east.

==== Battle of Zenta ====
The distractions of the war against Louis XIV had enabled the Turks to recapture Belgrade in 1690. In August 1691, the Austrians, under Louis of Baden, regained the advantage by heavily defeating the Turks at the Battle of Slankamen on the Danube, securing Habsburg possession of Hungary and Transylvania. When Baden was transferred west to fight the French in 1692, his successors, first Caprara, then from 1696, Augustus the Strong, the Elector of Saxony, proved incapable of delivering the final blow. On the advice of the President of the Imperial War Council, Ernst Rüdiger von Starhemberg, thirty-four-year old Eugene was offered supreme command of Imperial forces in April 1697. This was Eugene's first truly independent command—no longer need he suffer under the excessively cautious generalship of Caprara and Carafa, or be thwarted by the deviations of Victor Amadeus. But on joining his army, he found it in a state of 'indescribable misery'. Confident and self-assured, the Prince of Savoy (ably assisted by Commercy and Guido Starhemberg) set about restoring order and discipline.

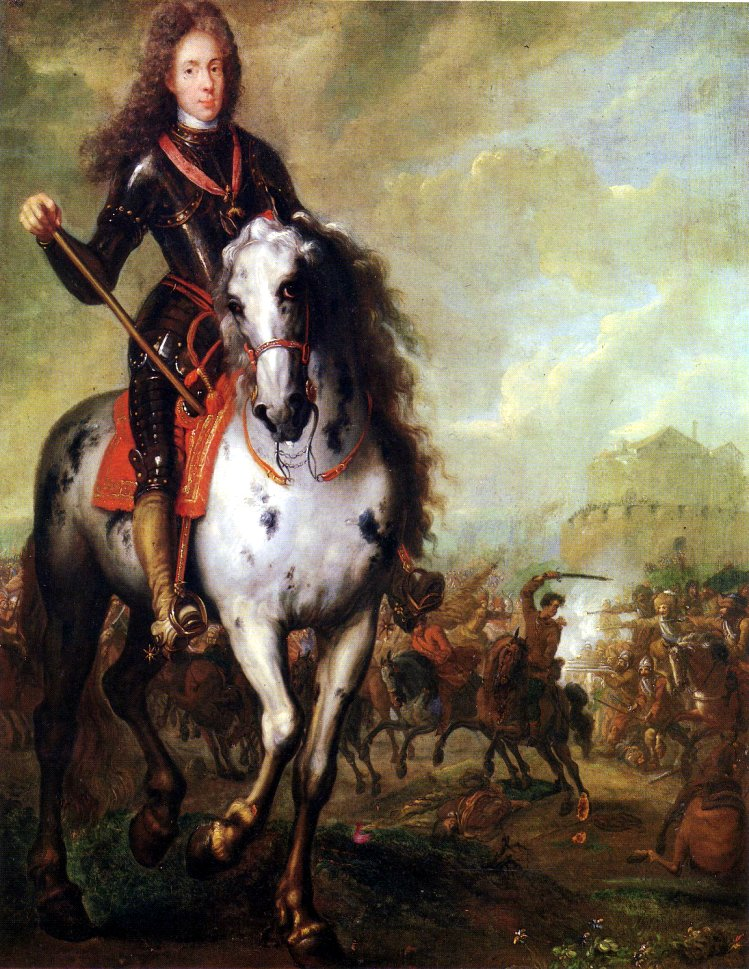
Portrait of Prince Eugene of Savoy (1663–1736) c. 1700. Flemish School.

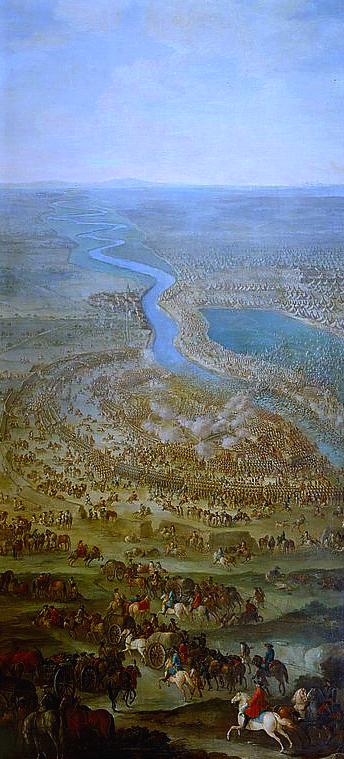
Battle of Zenta by Jacques-Ignace Parrocel.

Leopold I had warned Eugene that "he should act with extreme caution, forgo all risks and avoid engaging the enemy unless he has overwhelming strength and is practically certain of being completely victorious", but when the Imperial commander learnt of Sultan Mustafa II's march on Transylvania, Eugene abandoned all ideas of a defensive campaign and moved to intercept the Turks as they crossed the River Tisza at Zenta on 11 September 1697.

It was late in the day before the Imperial army struck. The Ottoman cavalry had already crossed the river so Eugene decided to attack immediately, arranging his men in a half-moon formation. The vigour of the assault wrought terror and confusion among the Turks, and by nightfall, the battle was won. For the loss of some 2,000 dead and wounded, Eugene had inflicted an overwhelming defeat upon the enemy with approximately 25,000 Turks killed, including the Grand Vizier, Elmas Mehmed Pasha, the pashas of Adana, Anatolia, and Bosnia, plus more than thirty aghas of the Janissaries, sipahis, and silihdars, as well as seven horsetails (symbols of high authority), 100 pieces of heavy artillery, 423 banners, and the revered seal which the sultan always entrusted to the Grand Vizier on an important campaign. Eugene had annihilated the Ottoman army and brought to an end the War of the Holy League. Although the Ottomans lacked western organization and training, the Savoyard prince had revealed his tactical skill, his capacity for bold decision, and his ability to inspire his men to excel in battle against a dangerous foe.

After a brief terror-raid into Ottoman Bosnia, culminating in the sack of Sarajevo, Eugene returned to Vienna in November to a triumphal reception. His victory at Zenta had turned him into a European hero, and with victory came reward. Land in Hungary, given him by the Emperor, yielded a good income, enabling the Prince to cultivate his newly acquired tastes in art and architecture (see below); but for all his newfound wealth and property, he was, nevertheless, without personal ties or family commitments. Of his four brothers, only one was still alive at this time. His fourth brother, Emmanuel, had died aged 14 in 1676; his third, Louis Julius (already mentioned) had died on active service in 1683, and his second brother, Philippe, died of smallpox in 1693. Eugene's remaining brother, Louis Thomas, ostracized for incurring the displeasure of Louis XIV, travelled Europe in search of a career, before arriving in Vienna in 1699. With Eugene's help, Louis found employment in the Imperial army, only to be killed in action against the French in 1702. Of Eugene's sisters, the youngest had died in childhood. The other two, Marie Jeanne-Baptiste and Louise Philiberte, led dissolute lives. Expelled from France, Marie joined her mother in Brussels, before eloping with a renegade priest to Geneva, living with him unhappily until her premature death in 1705. Of Louise, little is known after her early salacious life in Paris, but in due course, she lived for a time in a convent in Savoy before her death in 1726.

The Battle of Zenta proved to be the decisive victory in the long war against the Turks. With Leopold I's interests now focused on Spain and the imminent death of Charles II, the Emperor terminated the conflict with the Sultan; he signed the Treaty of Karlowitz on 26 January 1699.

== Middle life (1700–20) ==
=== War of the Spanish Succession ===
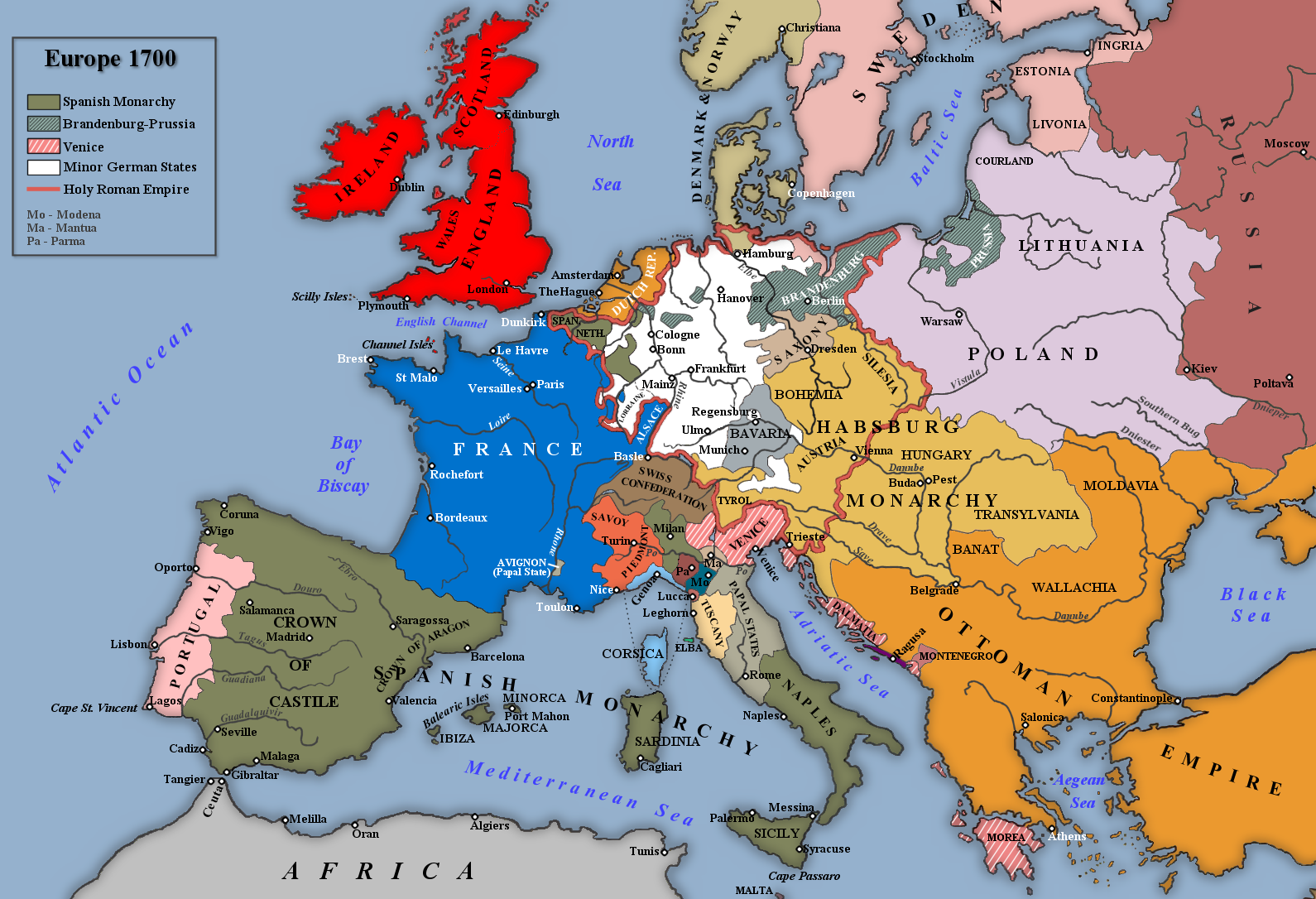
Europe at the beginning of the War of the Spanish Succession. Eugene fought primarily in northern Italy in the early years of the war, then later in the Low Countries.

With the death of the infirm and childless Charles II of Spain on 1 November 1700, the succession of the Spanish throne and subsequent control over her empire once again embroiled Europe in war—the War of the Spanish Succession. On his deathbed Charles II had bequeathed the entire Spanish inheritance to Louis XIV's grandson, Philip, Duke of Anjou. This threatened to unite the Spanish and French kingdoms under the House of Bourbon—something unacceptable to England, the Dutch Republic, and Leopold I, who had himself a claim to the Spanish throne. From the beginning, the Emperor had refused to accept the will of Charles II, and he did not wait for England and the Dutch Republic to begin hostilities. Before a new Grand Alliance could be concluded Leopold I prepared to send an expedition to seize the Spanish lands in Italy.

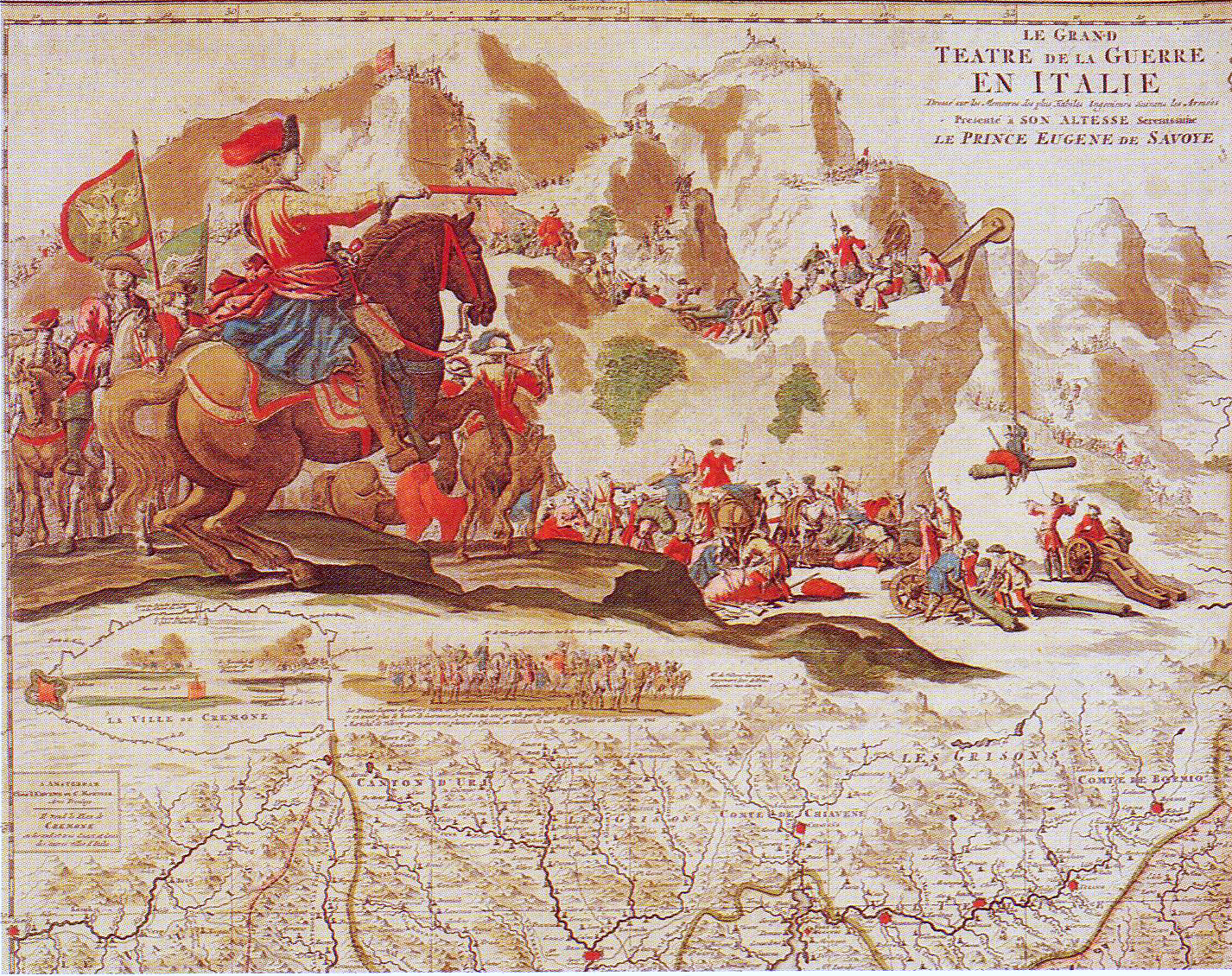
Prince Eugene crossing the Alps, 1701. Coloured copperplate engraving.

Eugene crossed the Alps with some 30,000 men in May/June 1701. After a series of brilliant manoeuvres the Imperial commander defeated Catinat at the Battle of Carpi on 9 July. "I have warned you that you are dealing with an enterprising young prince", wrote Louis XIV to his commander, "he does not tie himself down to the rules of war." On 1 September Eugene defeated Catinat's successor, Marshal Villeroi, at the Battle of Chiari, in a clash as destructive as any in the Italian theatre. But as so often throughout his career the Prince faced war on two fronts—the enemy in the field and the government in Vienna.

Starved of supplies, money, and men, Eugene was forced into unconventional means against the vastly superior enemy. During a daring raid on Cremona on the night of 31 January/1 February 1702 Eugene captured the French commander-in-chief. Yet the coup was less successful than hoped: Cremona remained in French hands, and the Duke of Vendôme, whose talents far exceeded Villeroi's, became the theatre's new commander. Villeroi's capture caused a sensation in Europe and had a galvanizing effect on English public opinion. "The surprise at Cremona", wrote the diarist John Evelyn, "... was the great discourse of this week"; but appeals for succour from Vienna remained unheeded, forcing Eugene to seek battle and gain a 'lucky hit'. The resulting Battle of Luzzara on 15 August proved inconclusive. Although Eugene's forces inflicted double the number of casualties on the French the battle settled little except to deter Vendôme trying an all-out assault on Imperial forces that year, enabling Eugene to hold on south of the Alps. With his army routing away, and personally grieving for his long-standing friend Prince Commercy who had died at Luzzara, Eugene returned to Vienna in January 1703.

==== President of the Imperial War Council ====
Eugene's European reputation was growing (Cremona and Luzzara had been celebrated as victories throughout the Allied capitals), yet because of the condition and morale of his troops the 1702 campaign had not been a success. Austria itself was now facing the direct threat of invasion from across the border in Bavaria where the state's Elector, Maximilian Emanuel, had declared for the Bourbons in August the previous year. Meanwhile, in Hungary a small-scale revolt had broken out in May and was fast gaining momentum. With the monarchy at the point of complete financial breakdown Leopold I was at last persuaded to change the government. At the end of June 1703 Gundaker Starhemberg replaced Gotthard Salaburg as President of the Treasury, and Prince Eugene succeeded Henry Mansfeld as the new President of the Imperial War Council (Hofkriegsratspräsident).

As head of the war council Eugene was now part of the Emperor's inner circle, and the first president since Raimondo Montecuccoli to remain an active commander. Immediate steps were taken to improve efficiency within the army: encouragement and, where possible, money, was sent to the commanders in the field; promotion and honours were distributed according to service rather than influence; and discipline improved. But the Austrian monarchy faced severe peril on several fronts in 1703: by June the Duke of Villars had reinforced the Elector of Bavaria on the Danube thus posing a direct threat to Vienna, while Vendôme remained at the head of a large army in northern Italy opposing Guido Starhemberg's weak Imperial force. Of equal alarm was Francis II Rákóczi's revolt which, by the end of the year, had reached as far as Moravia and Lower Austria.

==== Blenheim ====
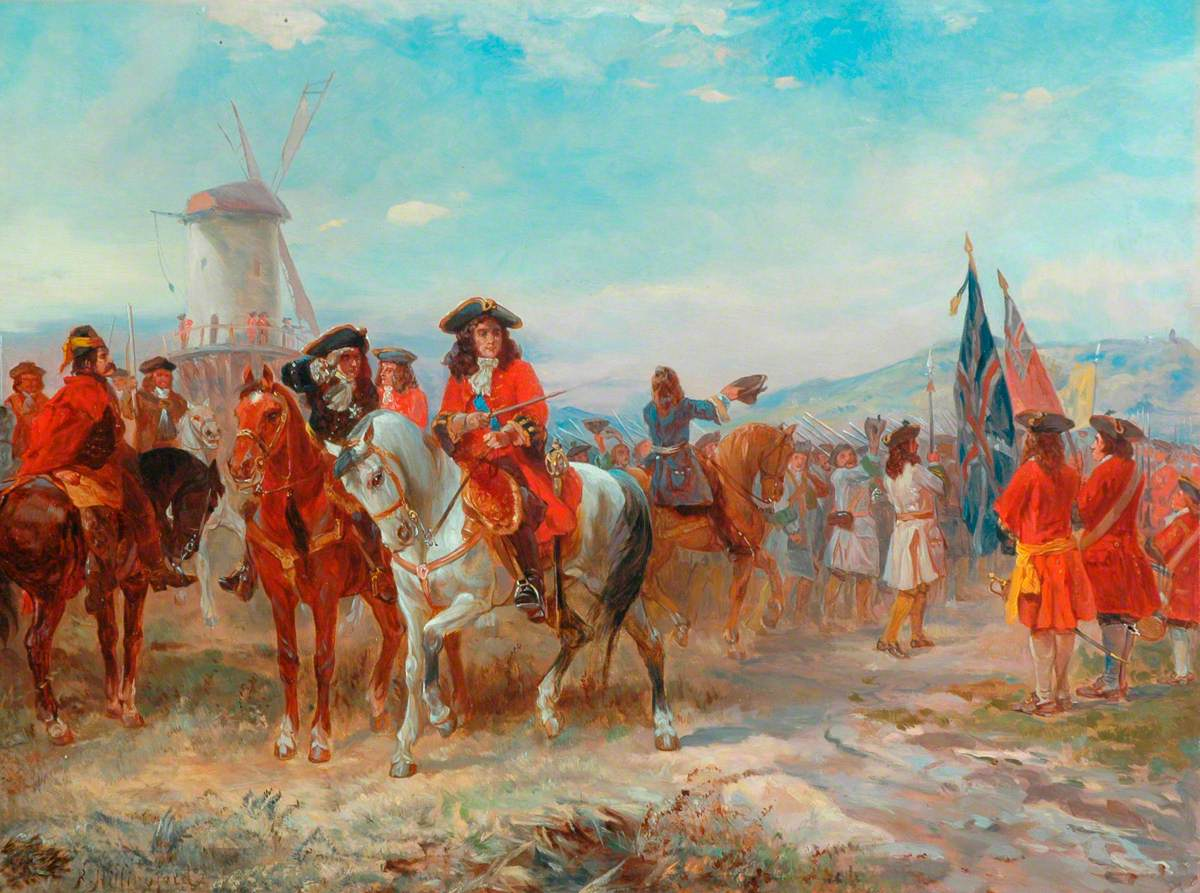
Meeting of the Duke of Marlborough and Prince Eugene at Blenheim, 1704 by Robert Alexander Hillingford.

Dissension between Villars and the Elector of Bavaria had prevented an assault on Vienna in 1703, but in the Courts of Versailles and Madrid, ministers confidently anticipated the city's fall. The Imperial ambassador in London, Count Wratislaw, had pressed for Anglo-Dutch assistance on the Danube as early as February 1703, but the crisis in southern Europe seemed remote from the Court of St. James's where colonial and commercial considerations were more to the fore of men's minds. Only a handful of statesmen in England or the Dutch Republic realized the true implications of Austria's peril; foremost among these was the English Captain-General, the Duke of Marlborough.

By early 1704 Marlborough had resolved to march south and rescue the situation in southern Germany and on the Danube, personally requesting the presence of Eugene on campaign so as to have "a supporter of his zeal and experience". The Allied commanders met for the first time at the small village of Mundelsheim on 10 June, and immediately formed a close rapport—the two men becoming, in the words of Thomas Lediard, 'Twin constellations in glory'. This professional and personal bond ensured mutual support on the battlefield, enabling many successes during the Spanish Succession war. The first of these victories, and the most celebrated, came on 13 August 1704 at the Battle of Blenheim. Eugene commanded the right wing of the Allied army, holding the Elector of Bavaria's and Marshal Marsin's superior forces, while Marlborough broke through the Marshal Tallard's center, inflicting over 30,000 casualties. The battle proved decisive: Vienna was saved and Bavaria was knocked out of the war. Both Allied commanders were full of praise for each other's performance. Eugene's holding operation, and his pressure for action leading up to the battle, proved crucial for the Allied success.

In Europe Blenheim is regarded as much a victory for Eugene as it is for Marlborough, a sentiment echoed by Sir Winston Churchill (Marlborough's descendant and biographer), who pays tribute to "the glory of Prince Eugene, whose fire and spirit had exhorted the wonderful exertions of his troops." France now faced the real danger of invasion, but Leopold I in Vienna was still under severe strain: Rákóczi's revolt was a major threat; and Guido Starhemberg and Victor Amadeus (who had once again switched loyalties and rejoined the Grand Alliance in 1703) had been unable to halt the French under Vendôme in northern Italy. Only Amadeus' capital, Turin, held on.

==== Turin and Toulon ====
Eugene's major engagements in the Italian theatre during the War of the Spanish Succession.

Eugene returned to Italy in April 1705, but his attempts to move west towards Turin were thwarted by Vendôme's skilful manoeuvres. Lacking boats and bridging materials, and with desertion and sickness rife within his army, the outnumbered Imperial commander was helpless. Leopold I's assurances of money and men had proved illusory, but desperate appeals from Amadeus and criticism from Vienna goaded the Prince into action, resulting in the Imperialists' bloody defeat at the Battle of Cassano on 16 August. Following Leopold I's death and the accession of Joseph I to the Imperial throne in May 1705, Eugene began to receive the personal backing he desired. Joseph I proved to be a strong supporter of Eugene's supremacy in military affairs; he was the most effective emperor the Prince served and the one he was happiest under. Promising support, Joseph I persuaded Eugene to return to Italy and restore Habsburg honour.

The Imperial commander arrived in theatre in mid-April 1706, just in time to organize an orderly retreat of what was left of Count Reventlow's inferior army following his defeat by Vendôme at the Battle of Calcinato on 19 April. Vendôme now prepared to defend the lines along the River Adige, determined to keep Eugene cooped to the east while the Marquis of La Feuillade threatened Turin. Feigning attacks along the Adige, Eugene descended south across the river Po in mid-July, outmanoeuvring the French commander and gaining a favourable position from which he could at last move west towards Piedmont and relieve Savoy's capital.

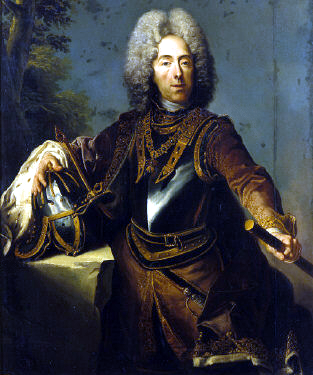
Prince Eugene by Jacob van Schuppen.

Events elsewhere now had major consequences for the war in Italy. With Villeroi's crushing defeat by Marlborough at the Battle of Ramillies on 23 May, Louis XIV recalled Vendôme north to take command of French forces in Flanders. It was a transfer that Saint-Simon considered something of a deliverance for the French commander who was "now beginning to feel the unlikelihood of success (in Italy) ... for Prince Eugene, with the reinforcements that had joined him after the Battle of Calcinato, had entirely changed the outlook in that theatre of the war." The Duke of Orléans, under the direction of Marsin, replaced Vendôme, but indecision and disorder in the French camp led to their undoing. After uniting his forces with Victor Amadeus at Villastellone in early September, Eugene attacked, overwhelmed, and decisively defeated the French forces besieging Turin on 7 September. Eugene's success broke the French hold on northern Italy, and the whole Po valley fell under Allied control. Eugene had gained a victory as signal as his colleague had at Ramillies—"It is impossible for me to express the joy it has given me;" wrote Marlborough, "for I not only esteem but I really love the prince. This glorious action must bring France so low, that if our friends could but be persuaded to carry on the war with vigour one year longer, we cannot fail, with the blessing of God, to have such a peace as will give us quiet for all our days."

The Imperial victory in Italy marked the beginning of Austrian rule in Lombardy, and earned Eugene the Governorship of Milan. But the following year was to prove a disappointment for the Prince and the Grand Alliance as a whole. The Emperor and Eugene (whose main goal after Turin was to take Naples and Sicily from Philip duc d'Anjou's supporters), reluctantly agreed to Marlborough's plan for an attack on Toulon—the seat of French naval power in the Mediterranean. Disunion between the Allied commanders—Victor Amadeus, Eugene, and the English Admiral Cloudesley Shovell—doomed the Toulon enterprise to failure. Although Eugene favoured some sort of attack on France's south-eastern border it was clear he felt the expedition impractical, and showed none of the "alacrity which he had displayed on other occasions." Substantial French reinforcements finally brought an end to the venture, and on 22 August 1707, the Imperial army began its retirement. The subsequent capture of Susa could not compensate for the total collapse of the Toulon expedition and with it any hope of an Allied war-winning blow that year.

==== Oudenarde and Malplaquet ====
Prince Eugene at Oudenarde (detail) by Jan van Huchtenburg, who was employed around 1709 to depict ten battle scenes.

At the beginning of 1708 Eugene successfully evaded calls for him to take charge in Spain (in the end Guido Starhemberg was sent), thus enabling him to take command of the Imperial army on the Moselle and once again unite with Marlborough in the Spanish Netherlands. Eugene (without his army) arrived at the Allied camp at Assche, west of Brussels, in early July, providing a welcome boost to morale after the early defection of Bruges and Ghent to the French. " ... our affairs improved through God's support and Eugene's aid", wrote the Prussian General Natzmer, "whose timely arrival raised the spirits of the army again and consoled us." Heartened by the Prince's confidence, the Allied commanders devised a bold plan to engage the French army under Vendôme and the Duke of Burgundy. On 10 July the Anglo-Dutch army made a forced march to surprise the French, reaching the River Scheldt just as the enemy was crossing to the north. The ensuing battle on 11 July—more a contact action rather than a set-piece engagement—ended in a resounding success for the Allies, aided by the dissension of the two French commanders. While Marlborough remained in overall command, Eugene had led the crucial right flank and centre. Once again the Allied commanders had co-operated remarkably well. "Prince Eugene and I", wrote the Duke, "shall never differ about our share of the laurels."

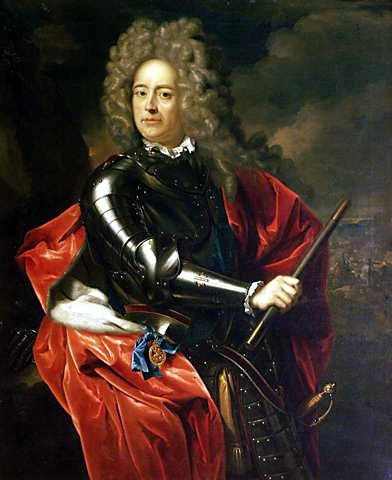
Duke of Marlborough (1650–1722) by Adriaen van der Werff. Eugene became Allied commander-in-chief following Marlborough's dismissal in 1711.

Marlborough now favoured a bold advance along the coast to bypass the major French fortresses, followed by a march on Paris. But fearful of unprotected supply-lines, the Dutch and Eugene favoured a more cautious approach. Marlborough acquiesced and resolved upon the siege of Vauban's great fortress, Lille. While the Duke commanded the covering force, Eugene oversaw the siege of the town which surrendered on 22 October but Marshal Boufflers did not yield the citadel until 10 December. Yet for all the difficulties of the siege (Eugene was badly wounded above his left eye by a musket ball, and even survived an attempt to poison him), the campaign of 1708 had been a remarkable success. The French were driven out of almost all the Spanish Netherlands. "He who has not seen this", wrote Eugene, "has seen nothing."

The recent defeats, together with the severe winter of 1708–09, had caused extreme famine and privation in France. Louis XIV was close to accepting Allied terms, but the conditions demanded by the leading Allied negotiators, Anthonie Heinsius, Charles Townshend, Marlborough, and Eugene—principally that Louis XIV should use his own troops to force Philip V off the Spanish throne—proved unacceptable to the French. Neither Eugene nor Marlborough had objected to the Allied demands at the time, but neither wanted the war with France to continue, and would have preferred further talks to deal with the Spanish issue. But the French King offered no further proposals. Lamenting the collapse of the negotiations, and aware of the vagaries of war, Eugene wrote to the Emperor in mid-June 1709. "There can be no doubt that the next battle will be the biggest and bloodiest that has yet been fought."

After the fall of Tournai on 3 September (itself a major undertaking), the Allied generals turned their attention towards Mons. Marshal Villars, recently joined by Boufflers, moved his army south-west of the town and began to fortify his position. Marlborough and Eugene favoured an engagement before Villars could render his position impregnable; but they also agreed to wait for reinforcements from Tournai which did not arrive until the following night, thus giving the French further opportunity to prepare their defences. Notwithstanding the difficulties of the attack, the Allied generals did not shrink from their original determination. The subsequent Battle of Malplaquet, fought on 11 September 1709, was the bloodiest engagement of the war. On the left flank, the Prince of Orange led his Dutch infantry in desperate charges only to have it cut to pieces; on the other flank, Eugene attacked and suffered almost as severely. But sustained pressure on his extremities forced Villars to weaken his centre, thus enabling Marlborough to break through and claim victory. Villars was unable to save Mons, which subsequently capitulated on 21 October, but his resolute defence at Malplaquet—inflicting up to 25% casualties on the Allies—may have saved France from destruction.

==== Final campaigning: Eugene alone ====
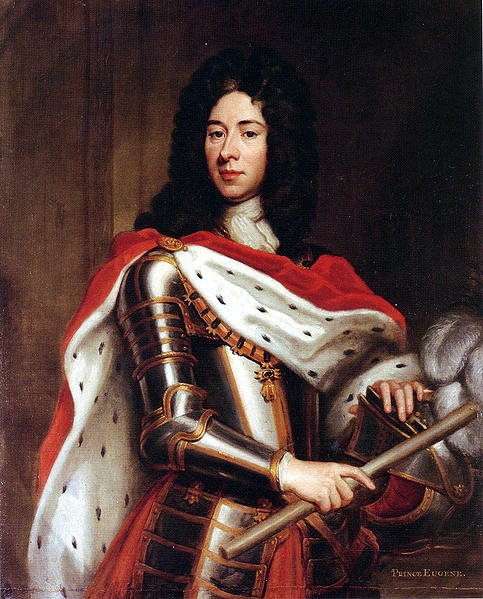
Portrait of Eugene from the school of Godfrey Kneller, 1712.

In August 1709 Eugene's chief political opponent and critic in Vienna, Prince Salm, retired as court chamberlain. Eugene and Wratislaw were now the undisputed leaders of the Austrian government: all major departments of state were in their hands or those of their political allies. Another attempt at a negotiated settlement at Geertruidenberg in April 1710 failed, largely because the British Whigs still felt strong enough to refuse concessions, while Louis XIV saw little reason to accept what he had refused the previous year. Eugene and Marlborough could not be accused of wrecking the negotiations, but neither showed regret at the breakdown of the talks. There was no alternative but to continue the war, and in June the Allied commanders captured Douai. This success was followed by a series of minor sieges, and by the close of 1710 the Allies had cleared much of France's protective ring of fortresses. Yet there had been no final, decisive breakthrough, and this was to be the last year that Eugene and Marlborough would work together.

Following the death of Joseph I on 17 April 1711 his brother, Charles, the pretender to the Spanish throne, became emperor. In England the new Tory government (the 'peace party' who had deposed the Whigs in October 1710) declared their unwillingness to see Charles VI become Emperor as well as King of Spain, and had already begun secret negotiations with the French. In January 1712 Eugene arrived in England hoping to divert the Tory government away from its peace policy, but despite the social success the visit was a political failure: Queen Anne and her ministers remained determined to end the war regardless of the Allies. Eugene had also arrived too late to save Marlborough who, seen by the Tories as the main obstacle to peace, had already been dismissed on charges of embezzlement. Elsewhere the Austrians had made some progress—the Hungarian revolt had finally came to end. Although Eugene would have preferred to crush the rebels the Emperor had offered lenient conditions, leading to the signing of the Treaty of Szatmár on 30 April 1711.

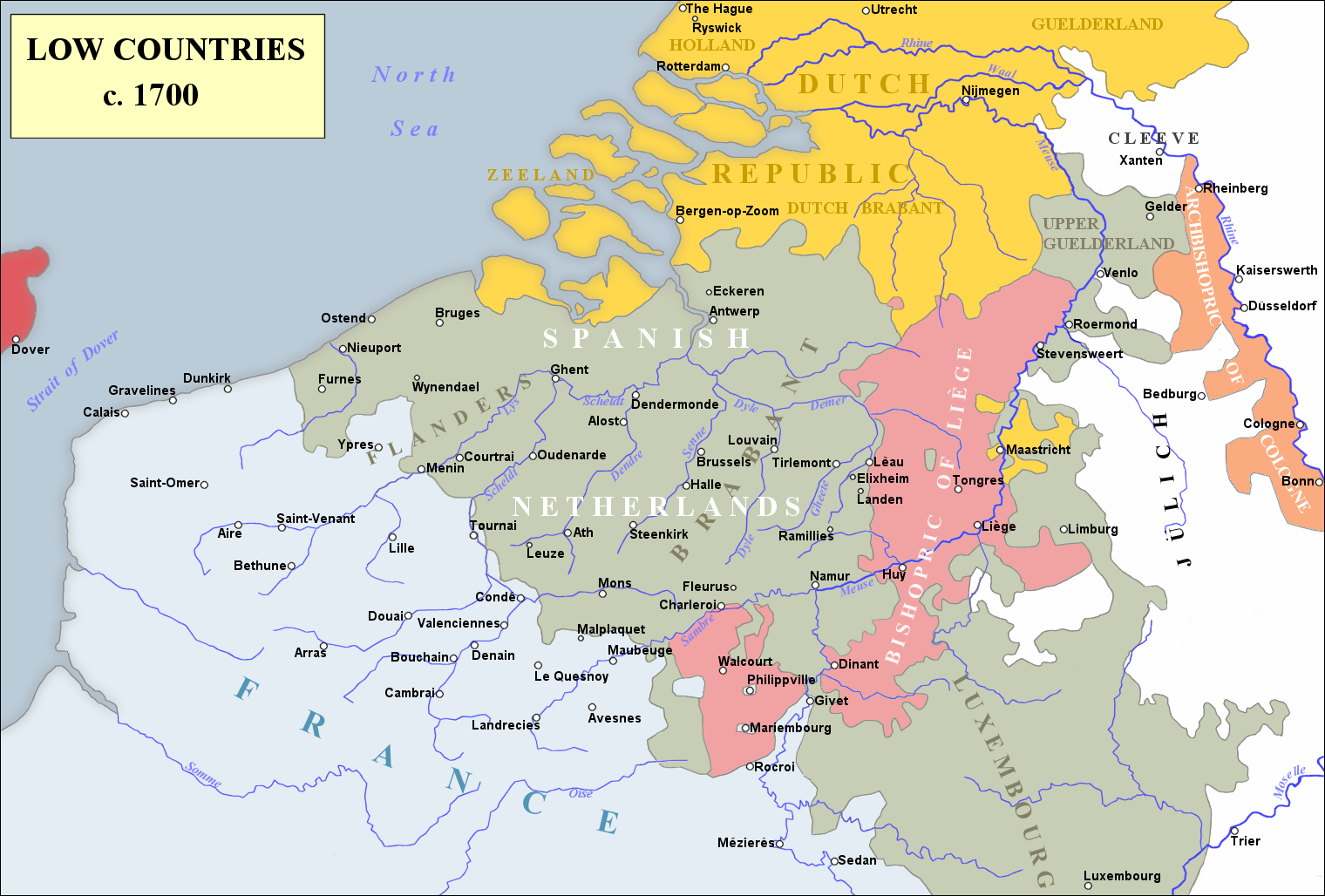
Following his victory in northern Italy, Eugene fought primarily in the Low Countries during the War of the Spanish Succession.

Hoping to influence public opinion in Britain and force the French into making substantial concessions, Eugene prepared for a major campaign. But on 21 May 1712—when the Tories felt they had secured favourable terms with their unilateral talks with the French—the Duke of Ormonde (Marlborough's successor) received the so-called 'restraining orders', forbidding him to take part in any military action. Eugene took the fortress of Le Quesnoy in early July, before besieging Landrecies, but Villars, taking advantage of Allied disunity, outmanoeuvred Eugene and defeated the Earl of Albermarle's Dutch garrison at the Battle of Denain on 24 July. The French followed the victory by seizing the Allies' main supply magazine at Marchiennes, before reversing their earlier losses at Douai, Le Quesnoy and Bouchain. In one summer the whole forward Allied position laboriously built up over the years to act as the springboard into France had been precipitously abandoned.

With the death in December of his friend and close political ally, Count Wratislaw, Eugene became undisputed 'first minister' in Vienna. His position was built on his military successes, but his actual power was expressed through his role as president of the war council, and as de facto president of the conference which dealt with foreign policy. In this position of influence Eugene took the lead in pressing Charles VI towards peace. The government had come to accept that further war in the Netherlands or Spain was impossible without the aid of the Maritime Powers; yet the Emperor, still hoping that somehow he could place himself on the throne in Spain, refused to make peace at the Utrecht conference along with the other Allies. Reluctantly, Eugene prepared for another campaign, but lacking troops, finance, and supplies his prospects in 1713 were poor. Villars, with superior numbers, was able to keep Eugene guessing as to his true intent. Through successful feints and stratagems Landau fell to the French commander in August, followed in November by Freiburg. Eugene was reluctant to carry on the war, and wrote to the Emperor in June that a bad peace would be better than being 'ruined equally by friend and foe'. With Austrian finances exhausted and the German states reluctant to continue the war, Charles VI was compelled to enter into negotiations. Eugene and Villars (who had been old friends since the Turkish campaigns of the 1680s) initiated talks on 26 November. Eugene proved an astute and determined negotiator, and gained favourable terms by the Treaty of Rastatt signed on 7 March 1714 and the Treaty of Baden signed on 7 September 1714. Despite the failed campaign in 1713 the Prince was able to declare that, "in spite of the military superiority of our enemies and the defection of our Allies, the conditions of peace will be more advantageous and more glorious than those we would have obtained at Utrecht."

=== Austro-Turkish War ===
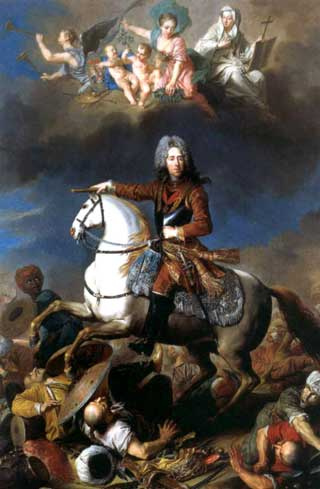
Prince Eugene during the Austro-Turkish War. Artist: Jacob van Schuppen.

Eugene's main reason for desiring peace in the west was the growing danger posed by the Turks in the east. Turkish military ambitions had revived after 1711 when they had mauled Peter the Great's army on the River Pruth (Pruth River Campaign): in December 1714 Sultan Ahmed III's forces attacked the Venetians in the Kingdom of the Morea. To Vienna it was clear that the Turks intended to attack Hungary and undo the whole Karlowitz settlement of 1699. After the Sublime Porte rejected an offer of mediation in April 1716, Charles VI despatched Eugene to Hungary to lead his relatively small but professional army. Of all Eugene's wars this was the one in which he exercised most direct control; it was also a war which, for the most part, Austria fought and won on her own. Eugene left Vienna in early June 1716 with a field army of between 80,000 and 90,000 men. By early August 1716 the Ottoman Turks, some 200,000 men under the sultan's son-in-law, the Grand Vizier Damat Ali Pasha, were marching from Belgrade towards Eugene's position on the north bank of the Danube west of the fortress of Petrovaradin. The Grand Vizier had intended to seize the fortress; but Eugene gave him no chance to do so. After resisting calls for caution and forgoing a council of war, the Prince decided to attack immediately on the morning of 5 August with approximately 70,000 men. The Turkish janissaries had some initial success, but after an Imperial cavalry attack on their flank, Ali Pasha's forces fell into confusion. Although the Imperials lost almost 5,000 dead or wounded, the Turks, who retreated in disorder to Belgrade, seem to have lost double that amount, including the Grand Vizier himself who had entered the mêlée and subsequently died of his wounds.

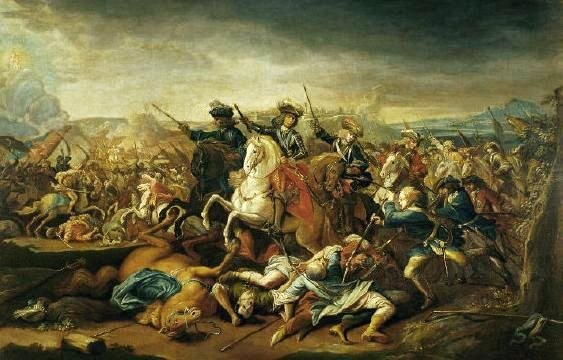
Eugene at the Battle of Belgrade 1717. Artist: Johann Gottfried Auerbach. The battle was Eugene's last great victory.

Eugene proceeded to take the Banat fortress of Temeswar in mid-October 1716 (thus ending 164 years of Turkish rule), before turning his attention to the next campaign and to what he considered the main goal of the war, Belgrade. Situated at the confluence of the Rivers Danube and Sava, Belgrade held a garrison of 30,000 men under Serasker Mustapha Pasha. Imperial troops besieged the place in mid-June 1717, and by the end of July large parts of the city had been destroyed by artillery fire. By the first days of August, however, a huge Turkish field army (150,000–200,000 strong), under the new Grand Vizier Hacı Halil Pasha had arrived on the plateau east of the city to relieve the garrison. News spread through Europe of Eugene's imminent destruction; but he had no intention of lifting the siege. With his men suffering from dysentery, and continuous bombardment from the plateau, Eugene, aware that a decisive victory alone could extricate his army, decided to attack the relief force. On the morning of 16 August, 40,000 Imperial troops marched through the fog, caught the Turks unaware, and routed Halil Pasha's army; a week later Belgrade surrendered, effectively bringing an end to the war. The victory was the crowning point of Eugene's military career and had confirmed him as the leading European general. His ability to snatch victory at the moment of defeat had shown the prince at his best.

The principal objectives of the war had been achieved: the task Eugene had begun at Zenta was complete, and the Karlowitz settlement secured. By the terms of the Treaty of Passarowitz, signed on 21 July 1718, the Turks surrendered the Banat of Temeswar, along with Belgrade and most of Serbia, although they regained the Morea from the Venetians. The war had dispelled the immediate Turkish threat to Hungary and was a triumph for Austria and for Eugene personally.

=== Quadruple Alliance ===
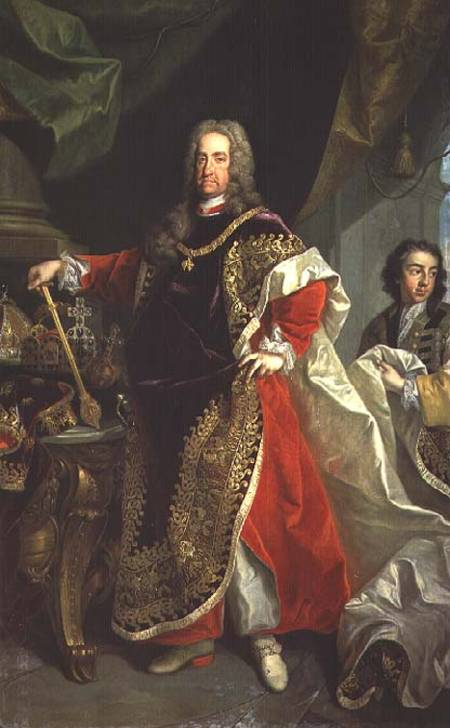
Charles VI (1685–1740), by Johann Gottfried Auerbach. Eugene served Emperor Charles VI for the last 25 years of his life.

While Eugene fought the Turks in the east, unresolved issues following the Utrecht/Rastatt settlements led to hostilities between the Emperor and Philip V of Spain in the west. Charles VI had refused to recognise Philip V as King of Spain, a title which he himself claimed; in return, Philip V had refused to renounce his claims to Naples, Milan, and the Netherlands, all of which had transferred to the House of Austria following the Spanish Succession war. Philip V was roused by his influential wife, Elisabeth Farnese, daughter of the Hereditary Prince of Parma, who personally held dynastic claims in the name of her son, Charles, to the duchies of Tuscany, Parma and Piacenza. Representatives from a newly formed Anglo-French alliance—who were desirous of European peace for their own dynastic securities and trade opportunities—called on both parties to recognise each other's sovereignty. Yet Philip V remained intractable, and on 22 August 1717 his chief minister, Alberoni, effected the invasion of Austrian Sardinia in what seemed like the beginning of the reconquest of Spain's former Italian empire.

Eugene returned to Vienna from his recent victory at Belgrade (before the conclusion of the Turkish war) determined to prevent an escalation of the conflict, complaining that, "two wars cannot be waged with one army"; only reluctantly did the Prince release some troops from the Balkans for the Italian campaign. Rejecting all diplomatic overtures Philip V unleashed another assault in June 1718, this time against Savoyard Sicily as a preliminary to attacking the Italian mainland. Realizing that only the British fleet could prevent further Spanish landings, and that pro-Spanish groups in France might push the regent, Duke of Orléans, into war against Austria, Charles VI had no option but to sign the Quadruple Alliance on 2 August 1718, and formally renounce his claim to Spain. Despite the Spanish fleet's destruction off Cape Passaro, Philip V and Elisabeth remained resolute, and rejected the treaty.

Although Eugene could have gone south after the conclusion of the Turkish war, he chose instead to conduct operations from Vienna; but Austria's military effort in Sicily proved derisory, and Eugene's chosen commanders, Zum Jungen, and later Count Mercy, performed poorly. It was only from pressure exerted by the French army advancing into the Basque provinces of northern Spain in April 1719, and the British Navy's attacks on the Spanish fleet and shipping, that compelled Philip V and Elisabeth to dismiss Alberoni and join the Quadruple Alliance on 25 January 1720. Nevertheless, the Spanish attacks had strained Charles VI's government, causing tension between the Emperor and his Spanish Council on the one hand, and the conference, headed by Eugene, on the other. Despite Charles VI's own personal ambitions in the Mediterranean it was clear to the Emperor that Eugene had put the safeguarding of his conquests in Hungary before everything else, and that military failure in Sicily also had to rest on Eugene. Consequently, the Prince's influence over the Emperor declined considerably.

== Later life (1721–36) ==
=== Governor-General of the Austrian Netherlands ===
Eugene had become governor of the Austrian Netherlands—in June 1716, but he was an absent ruler, directing policy from Vienna through his chosen representative the Marquis of Prié. Prié proved unpopular with the local population and the guilds who, following the Barrier Treaty of 1715, were obliged to meet the financial demands of the administration and the Dutch barrier garrisons; with Eugene's backing and encouragement, civil disturbances in Antwerp and Brussels were forcibly suppressed. After displeasing the Emperor over his initial opposition to the formation of the Ostend Company, Prié also lost the support of the native nobility from within his own council of state in Brussels, particularly from the Marquis de Mérode-Westerloo. One of Eugene's former favourites, General Bonneval, also joined the noblemen in opposition to Prié, further undermining the Prince. When Prié's position became untenable, Eugene felt compelled to resign his post as governor of the Austrian Netherlands on 16 November 1724. As compensation, Charles VI conferred on him the honorary position as vicar-general of Italy, worth 140,000 gulden a year, and an estate at Siebenbrunn in Lower Austria said to be worth double that amount. But his resignation distressed him, and to compound his concerns Eugene caught a severe bout of influenza that Christmas, marking the beginning of permanent bronchitis and acute infections every winter for the remaining twelve years of his life.

=== 'Cold war' ===
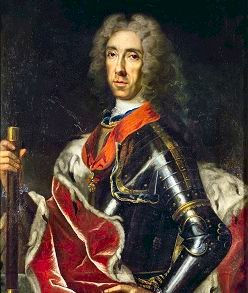
Prince Eugene by Jan Kupecký.

The 1720s saw rapidly changing alliances between the European powers and almost constant diplomatic confrontation, largely over unsolved issues regarding the Quadruple Alliance. The Emperor and the Spanish king continued to use each other's titles, and Charles VI still refused to remove the remaining legal obstacles to Don Charles' eventual succession to the duchies of Parma and Tuscany. Yet in a surprise move Spain and Austria moved closer with the signing of the Treaty of Vienna in April/May 1725. In response Britain, France, and Prussia joined in the Alliance of Hanover to counter the danger to Europe of an Austro-Spanish hegemony. For the next three years there was the continual threat of war between the Hanover Treaty powers and the Austro-Spanish bloc.

From 1726, Eugene gradually began to regain his political influence. With his many contacts throughout Europe Eugene, backed by Gundaker Starhemberg and Count Schönborn, the Imperial vice-chancellor, managed to secure powerful allies and strengthen the Emperor's position—his skill in managing the vast secret diplomatic network over the coming years was the main reason why Charles VI once again came to depend upon him. In August 1726 Russia acceded to the Austro-Spanish alliance, and in October Frederick William I of Prussia followed suit by defecting from the Allies with the signing of a mutual defensive treaty with the Emperor.

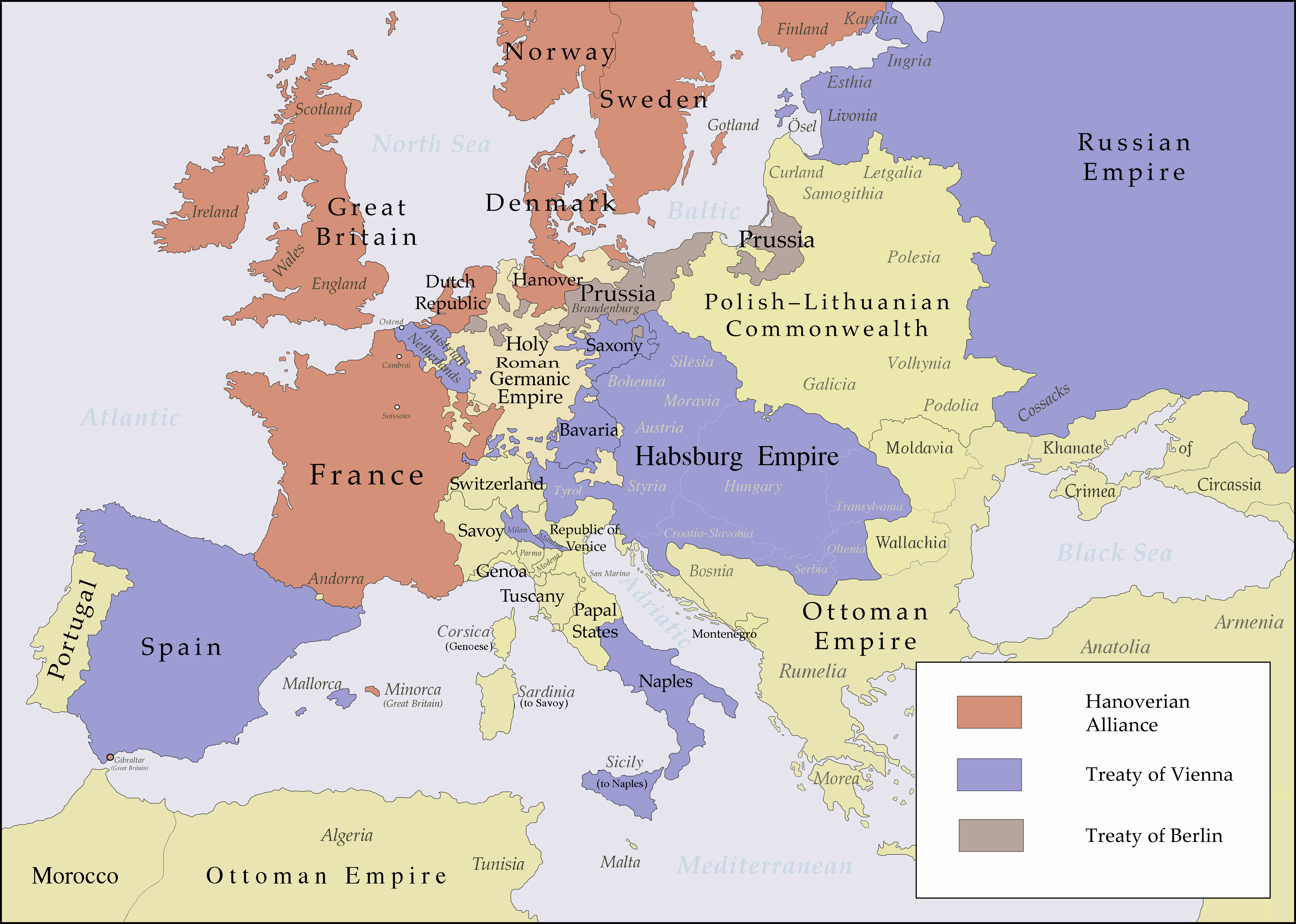
Coalitions in Europe between 1725 and 1730. Signatories of the Treaty of Vienna (30 April 1725) in blue and signatories of the Treaty of Hanover (3 September 1725) in red. Prussia, in brown, first joined the Hanoverian Alliance, but later changed sides after the Treaty of Berlin on 23 December 1728.

Despite the conclusion of the brief Anglo-Spanish conflict, manoeuvring between the European powers persisted throughout 1727–28. In 1729 Elisabeth Farnese abandoned the Austro-Spanish alliance. Realizing that Charles VI could not be drawn into the marriage pact she wanted, Elisabeth concluded that the best way to secure her son's succession to Parma and Tuscany now lay with Britain and France. To Eugene it was 'an event that which is seldom to be found in history'. Following the Prince's determined lead to resist all pressure, Charles VI sent troops into Italy to prevent the entry of Spanish garrisons into the contested duchies. By the beginning of 1730 Eugene, who had remained bellicose throughout the whole period, was again in control of Austrian policy.

In Britain there now emerged a new political re-alignment as the Anglo-French entente became increasingly defunct. Believing that a resurgent France now posed the greatest danger to their security, Robert Walpole led British ministers in moving to reform the Anglo-Austrian Alliance, leading to the signing of the Second Treaty of Vienna on 16 March 1731. Eugene had been the Austrian minister most responsible for the alliance, believing once again it would provide security against France and Spain. The treaty compelled Charles VI to sacrifice the Ostend Company and accept, unequivocally, the accession of Don Charles to Parma and Tuscany. In return King George II as King of Great Britain and Elector of Electorate of Hanover guaranteed the Pragmatic Sanction, the device to secure the rights of the Emperor's daughter, Maria Theresa, to the entire Habsburg inheritance. It was largely through Eugene's diplomacy that in January 1732 the Imperial diet also guaranteed the Pragmatic Sanction which, together with the Treaties with Britain, Russia, and Prussia, marked the culmination of the Prince's diplomacy. But the Treaty of Vienna had infuriated the court of King Louis XV: the French had been ignored and the Pragmatic Sanction guaranteed, thus increasing Habsburg influence and confirming Austria's vast territorial size. The Emperor also intended Maria Theresa to marry Duke Francis Stephen of Lorraine which would present an unacceptable threat on France's border. By the beginning of 1733 the French army was ready for war: all that was needed was the excuse.

=== War of the Polish Succession ===
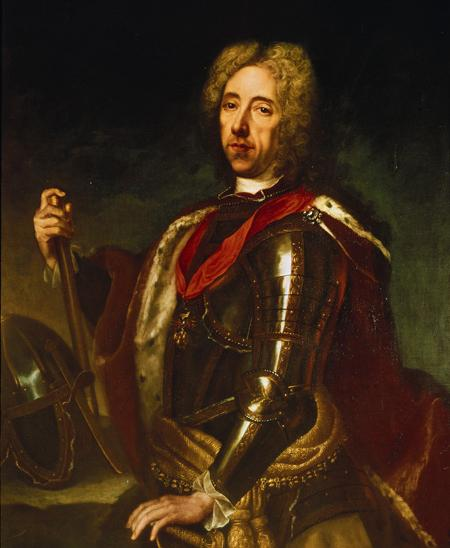
Portrait of Prince Eugene of Savoy in later years by Jan Kupecký.

In 1733 the Polish King and Elector of Saxony, Augustus the Strong, died. There were two candidates for his successor: first, Stanisław Leszczyński, the father-in-law of Louis XV; second, the Elector of Saxony's son, Augustus, supported by Russia, Austria, and Prussia. The Polish succession had afforded Louis XV's chief minister, Fleury, the opportunity to attack Austria and take Lorraine from Francis Stephen. To gain Spanish support France backed the succession of Elisabeth Farnese's sons to further Italian lands.

Eugene entered the War of the Polish Succession as President of the Imperial War Council and commander-in-chief of the army, but he was severely handicapped by the quality of his troops and the shortage of funds; now in his seventies, the Prince was also burdened by rapidly declining physical and mental powers. France declared war on Austria on 10 October 1733, but without the funds from the Maritime Powers – who, despite the Vienna treaty, remained neutral throughout the war – Austria could not hire the necessary troops to wage an offensive campaign. "The danger to the monarchy", wrote Eugene to the Emperor in October, "cannot be exaggerated". By the end of the year French forces had seized Lorraine and Milan; by early 1734 Spanish troops had taken Sicily.

Eugene took command on the Rhine in April 1734, but vastly outnumbered he was forced onto the defensive. In June Eugene set out to relieve Philippsburg, yet his former drive and energy was now gone. Accompanying Eugene was a young prince Frederick of Prussia, sent by his father to learn the art of war. Frederick gained considerable knowledge from Eugene, recalling in later life his great debt to his Austrian mentor, but the Prussian prince was aghast at Eugene's condition, writing later, "his body was still there but his soul had gone." Eugene conducted another cautious campaign in 1735, once again pursuing a sensible defensive strategy on limited resources; but his short-term memory was by now practically non-existent, and his political influence disappeared completely—Gundaker Starhemberg and Johann Christoph von Bartenstein now dominated the conference in his place. Fortunately for Charles VI, Fleury was determined to limit the scope of the war, and in October 1735 he granted generous peace preliminaries to the Emperor.

=== Later years and death ===
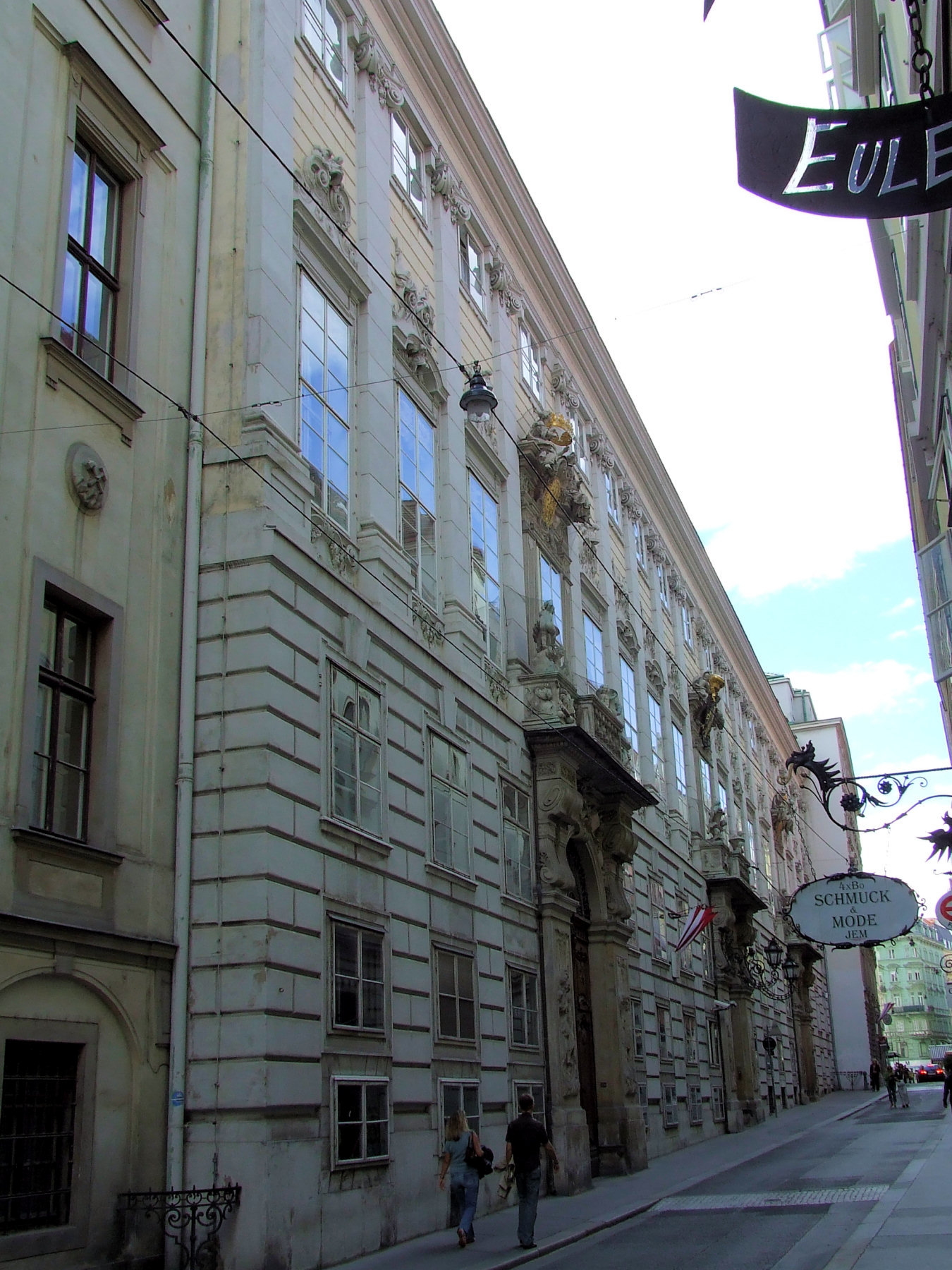
Eugene's Stadtpalais, Vienna, where the Prince conducted most of his business.

Eugene returned to Vienna from the War of the Polish Succession in October 1735, weak and feeble; when Maria Theresa and Francis Stephen married in February 1736 Eugene was too ill to attend. After playing cards at Countess Batthyány's on the evening of 20 April until nine in the evening, he returned home to the Stadtpalais, his attendant offered him to take his prescribed medicine which Eugene declined.

When his servants arrived to wake him the next morning on 21 April 1736, they found Prince Eugene dead after passing away quietly during the night. It has been said that on the same morning he was discovered dead, the great lion in his menagerie was also found dead.

Eugene's heart was buried with the ashes of his ancestors in Turin, in the Basilica of Superga. His remains were carried in a long procession to St. Stephen's Cathedral, where his embalmed body was buried in the Kreuzkapelle. It is said that the emperor himself attended as a mourner without anybody's knowledge.

The Prince's niece Maria Anna Victoria, whom he had never met, inherited Eugene's immense possessions. Within a few years she sold off the palaces, the country estates and the art collection of a man who had become one of the wealthiest in Europe, after arriving in Vienna as a refugee with empty pockets.

== Personal life ==
Being an Italian by descent, a Frenchman by birth, and a German by adoption, Prince Eugene signed his name using the trilingual form “Eugenio von Savoye” (Italian: Eugenio, German: von, French: Savoye).

Eugene never married. He was reported to have said that a woman was a hindrance in war and that a soldier should not marry. Some contemporaries attributed his defeat at the 1712 Battle of Denain to the presence of an Italian lady accompanying him on campaign, a claim repeated by Voltaire, who said he had met the woman in question. He was sometimes described as "Mars without Venus" for his lifelong bachelorhood. Winston Churchill, in his biography of the John Churchill, 1st Duke of Marlborough, wrote that Eugene was "a bachelor, almost a misogynist, disdainful of money, content with his bright sword and his lifelong animosity against Louis XIV".

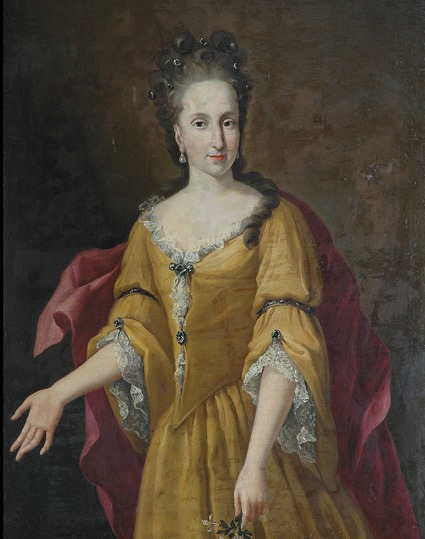
Hungarian Countess Eleonore Batthyány-Strattmann, Viennese court lady and companion of Prince Eugene.

For the final two decades of his life, Eugene was closely associated with Hungarian Countess Eleonore Batthyány-Strattmann, the widowed daughter of Theodor von Strattman, a former Hofkanzler. Although Eugene left no personal papers beyond official correspondence, he and Eleonore were constant companions. They met almost daily for dinner, receptions, and card games, and were widely assumed by diplomats to be lovers. One earlier reference exists to another woman, Countess Maria Thürheim, but there is no further evidence of a relationship. The precise beginning of Eugene and Eleonore's relationship is unknown, though their estates in Hungary near Rechnitz Castle made them neighbours after the Battle of Zenta. In diplomatic correspondence of the early 18th century, she was referred to as “Eugen’s Egeria” and eventually as his constant companion. When asked if she and the prince would marry, Eleonore reportedly replied, “I love him too well for that, I would rather have a bad reputation than deprive him of his.”

Allegations concerning Eugene’s private life circulated in later court correspondence, most notably from Elizabeth Charlotte, Duchess of Orléans, a prolific letter-writer and wife of Philippe I, Duke of Orléans, a noted court figure known for male companions and brother to Louis XIV. In her correspondence, she alleged that Eugene had engaged in “youthful indiscretions” with lackeys and pages, and claimed that he was denied an ecclesiastical benefice due to “depravity”. Eugene’s biographer Helmut Oehler attributed these comments to her personal hostility. Eugene himself mocked the claims in his memoirs as “the invented anecdotes from the gallery of Versailles”. These allegations were made many years later, after Eugene had inflicted military defeats on her brother-in-law Louis XIV. No further contemporary accusations regarding Eugene’s private life were recorded. According to historians Kramar and Mayrhofer, reflecting the attitudes of a time when such allegations were framed as discrediting or defamatory, “there was never again an observer or a malicious diplomat who accused Eugene of homosexual inclinations”.

Eugene’s high standing at court also attracted criticism. Guido Starhemberg, a former subordinate, became a vocal critic. Montesquieu described him as Eugene’s chief rival at the Habsburg court. Another rival, Johann Matthias von der Schulenburg, who had served under Eugene during the War of the Spanish Succession, criticised him in a letter, writing: He "has no idea but to fight whenever the opportunity offers". and adding that he “loves la petite débauche et la p---- above all things.” Eugene’s principal biographer, Max Braubach, interpreted the phrase as referring to general sexual indulgence, such as fornication or whoring. As Governor-General of the Austrian Netherlands, Eugene was linked to an exclusive brothel on Amsterdam’s Prinsengracht. The establishment, operated by a woman known as Madame Therese, was reportedly frequented by Eugene, who is said to have once brought the English consul as a guest. A drawing by Cornelis Troost, held by the Rijksmuseum, depicts Eugene inspecting a line-up of prostitutes “as he did his own troops”. According to the museum, the image was based on a contemporary anecdote.

Eugene’s closest personal relationships also shaped his legacy. He was especially close to the papal nuncio, Domenico Silvio Passionei, who later delivered his funeral oration. Without a direct family of his own, Eugene arranged the marriage of his only surviving nephew, Emmanuel Thomas, son of his brother Louis Thomas, to Princess Maria Theresia of Liechtenstein, Duchess of Troppau. Emmanuel died of smallpox in 1729. Eugene then turned to his grand-nephew, Eugene Jean, Count of Soissons, Emmanuel’s only son and Eugene’s last male heir. Seeking to establish a second Savoy principality in central Italy, Eugene arranged a marriage between Eugene Jean and the child sovereign of the Duchy of Massa and Carrara, Maria Teresa Cybo-Malaspina, then under regency. He secured the approval of Charles VI, Holy Roman Emperor and Charles Emmanuel III of Sardinia. Though matrimonial agreements were signed in 1732, the marriage never took place due to Eugene Jean's early death in 1734 in Mannheim while he was serving in the imperial army.

With Eugene Jean’s death, Prince Eugene’s closest relative was Princess Maria Anna Victoria of Savoy, daughter of Louis Thomas and Eugene Jean’s aunt. Though Eugene never met her, and reportedly showed no interest in doing so, she became his legal heiress in the absence of a will. She was preferred over his cousin, Victor Amadeus I, Prince of Carignano, head of the cadet branch of the House of Savoy bearing that name.

== Patron of the arts ==
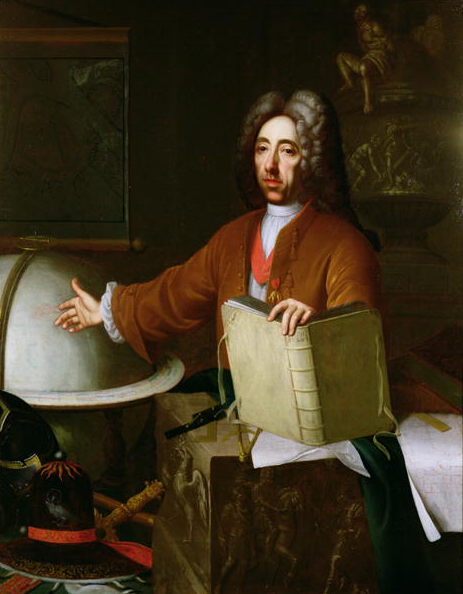
Portrait of Prince Eugene by Jacob van Schuppen.

Eugene's rewards for his victories, his share of booty, his revenues from his abbeys in Savoy, and a steady income from his Imperial offices and governorships, enabled him to contribute to the landscape of Baroque architecture Eugene spent most of his life in Vienna at his Winter Palace, the Stadtpalais, built by Fischer von Erlach. The palace acted as his official residence and home, but for reasons that remain speculative the Prince's association with Fischer ended before the building was complete, favouring instead Johann Lukas von Hildebrandt as his chief architect. Eugene first employed Hildebrandt to finish the Stadtpalais before commissioning him to prepare plans for a palace on his Danubian island at Ráckeve, the Savoy Castle in Ráckeve. Begun in 1701 the single-story building took twenty years to complete; yet, probably because of the Rákóczi revolt, the Prince seems to have visited it only once—after the siege of Belgrade in 1717.

Of more importance was the grandiose complex of the two Belvedere palaces in Vienna. The single-storey Lower Belvedere, with its exotic gardens and zoo, was completed in 1716. The Upper Belvedere, completed between 1720 and 1722, is a more substantial building; with sparkling white stucco walls and copper roof, it became a wonder of Europe. Eugene and Hildebrandt also converted an existing structure on his Marchfeld estate into a country seat, the Schloss Hof, situated between the Rivers Danube and Morava. The building, completed in 1729, was far less elaborate than his other projects but it was strong enough to serve as a fortress in case of need. Eugene spent much of his spare time there in his last years accommodating large hunting parties.

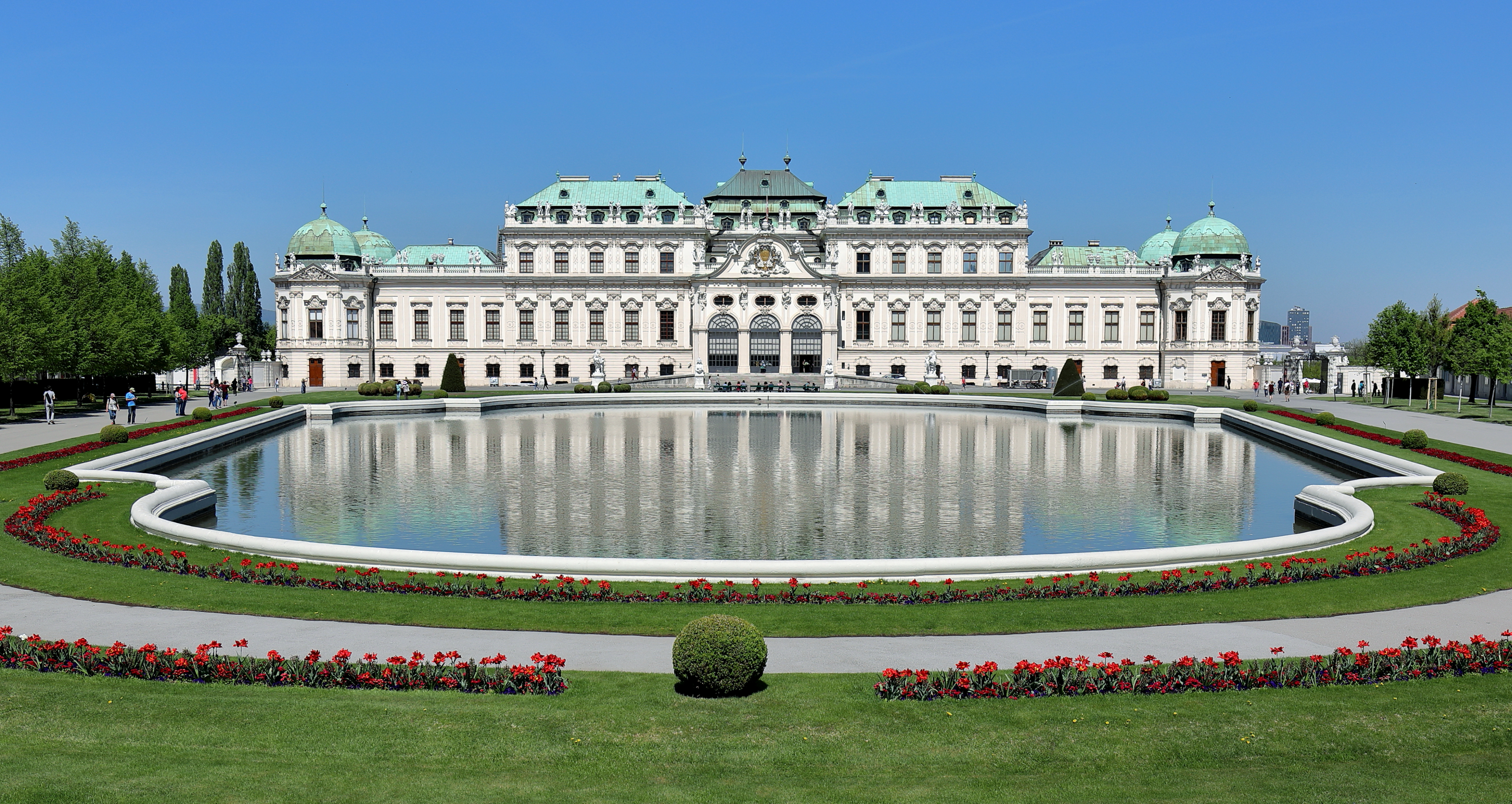
Upper Belvedere, Vienna, the summer residence of Prince Eugene of Savoy

In the years following the Peace of Rastatt Eugene became acquainted with a large number of scholarly men. Given his position and responsiveness, they were keen to meet him: few could exist without patronage and this was probably the main reason for Gottfried Leibniz's association with him in 1714. Eugene also befriended the French writer Jean-Baptiste Rousseau who, by 1716, was receiving financial support from Eugene. Rousseau stayed on attached to the Prince's household, probably helping in the library, until he left for the Netherlands in 1722. Another acquaintance, Montesquieu, already famous for his Persian Letters when he arrived in Vienna in 1728, favourably recalled his time spent at the Prince's table. Nevertheless, Eugene had no literary pretensions of his own, and was not tempted like Maurice de Saxe or Marshal Villars to write his memoirs or books on the art of war. He did, however, become a collector on the grandest scale: his picture galleries were filled with 16th- and 17th-century Italian, Dutch and Flemish art; his library at the Stadtpalais crammed with over 15,000 books, 237 manuscripts as well as a huge collection of prints (of particular interest were books on natural history and geography). "It is hardly believable", wrote Rousseau, "that a man who carries on his shoulders the burden of almost all the affairs of Europe ... should find as much time to read as though he had nothing else to do."

At Eugene's death his possessions and estates, except those in Hungary which the crown reclaimed, went to his niece, Princess Maria Anna Victoria, who at once decided to sell everything. The artwork was bought by Charles Emmanuel III of Sardinia. Eugene's library, prints and drawings were purchased by the Emperor in 1737 and have since passed into Austrian national collections.

== Historical reputation and legacy ==
Napoleon considered Eugene one of the eight greatest commanders of history. Although later military critics have disagreed with that assessment, Eugene was undoubtedly the greatest Austrian general. He was no military innovator, but he had the ability to make an inadequate system work. He was equally adept as an organiser, strategist, and tactician, believing in the primacy of battle and his ability to seize the opportune moment to launch a successful attack.

"The important thing", wrote Maurice de Saxe in his Reveries, "is to see the opportunity and to know how to use it. Prince Eugene possessed this quality which is the greatest in the art of war and which is the test of the most elevated genius." This fluidity was key to his battlefield successes in Italy and in his wars against the Turks. Nevertheless, in the Low Countries, particularly after the battle of Oudenarde in 1708, Eugene, like his cousin Louis of Baden, tended to play safe and become bogged down in a conservative strategy of sieges and defending supply lines. After the attempt on Toulon in 1707, he also became very wary of combined land/sea operations. To historian Derek McKay the main criticism of him as a general is his legacy—he left no school of officers nor an army able to function without him.

Eugene was a disciplinarian—when ordinary soldiers disobeyed orders he was prepared to shoot them himself—but he rejected blind brutality, writing "you should only be harsh when, as often happens, kindness proves useless".

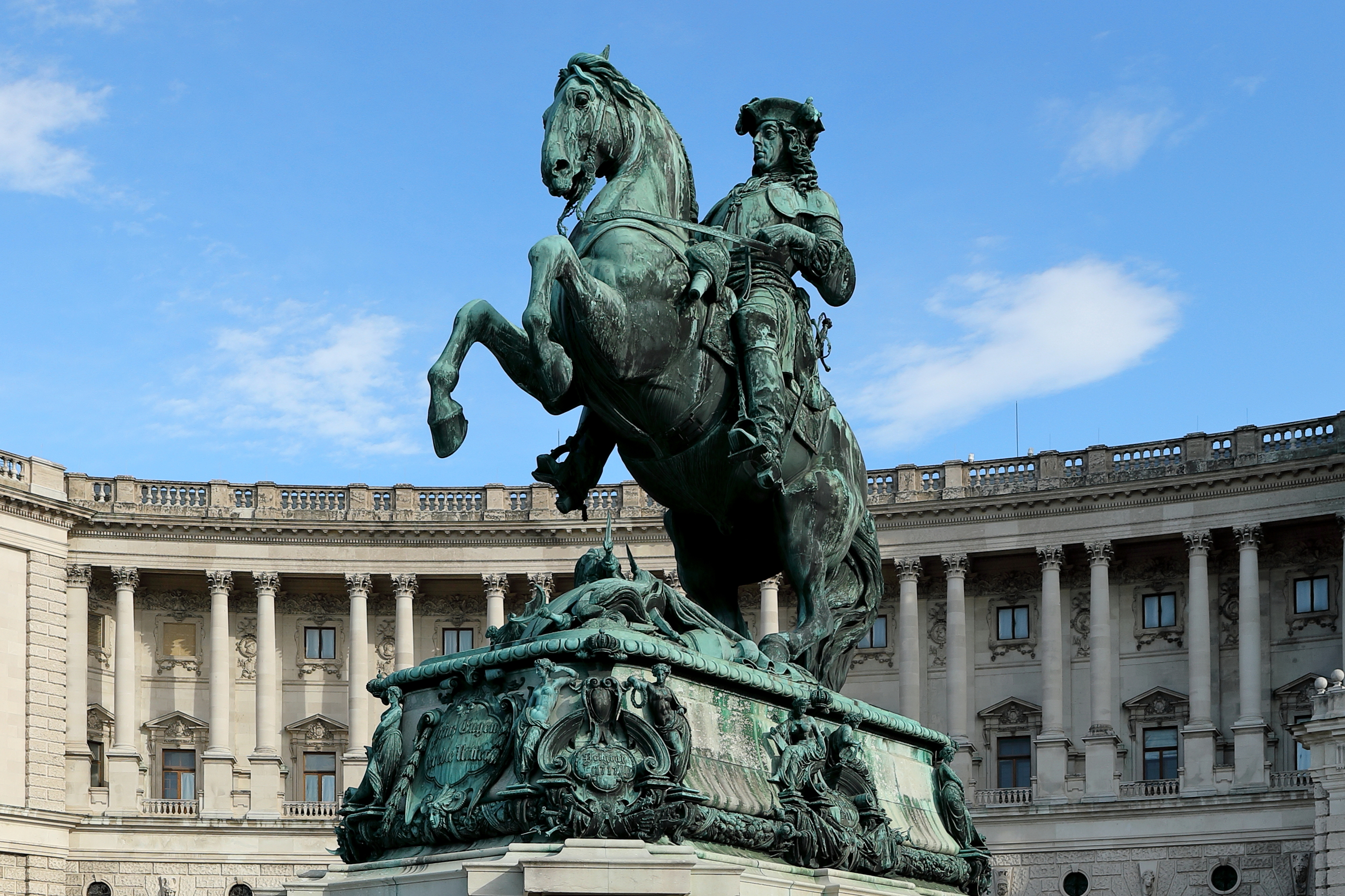
Eugene's monument in Heldenplatz, Vienna, by Anton Dominik Fernkorn.

On the battlefield Eugene demanded courage in his subordinates, and expected his men to fight where and when he wanted; his criteria for promotion were based primarily on obedience to orders and courage on the battlefield rather than social position. On the whole, his men responded because he was willing to push himself as hard as them. His position as President of the Imperial War Council proved less successful. Following the long period of peace after the Austro-Turkish War, the idea of creating a separate field army or providing garrison troops with effective training for them to be turned into such an army quickly was never considered by Eugene. By the time of the War of the Polish Succession, therefore, the Austrians were outclassed by a better prepared French force. For this Eugene was largely to blame—in his view (unlike the drilling and manoeuvres carried out by the Prussians which to Eugene seemed irrelevant to real warfare) the time to create actual fighting men was when war came.

Although Frederick II of Prussia had been struck by the muddle of the Austrian army and its poor organisation during the Polish Succession war, he later amended his initial harsh judgements. "If I understand anything of my trade", commented Frederick in 1758, "especially in the more difficult aspects, I owe that advantage to Prince Eugene. From him I learnt to hold grand objectives constantly in view, and direct all my resources to those ends." To historian Christopher Duffy it was this awareness of the 'grand strategy' that was Eugene's legacy to Frederick.

To his responsibilities, Eugene attached his own personal values – physical courage, loyalty to his sovereign, honesty, self-control in all things – and he expected these qualities from his commanders. Eugene's approach was dictatorial, but he was willing to co-operate with someone he regarded as his equal, such as Baden or Marlborough. Yet the contrast with his co-commander of the Spanish Succession war was stark. According to Churchill, "Marlborough was the model husband and father, concerned with building up a home, founding a family, and gathering a fortune to sustain it", whereas Eugene, the bachelor, was "disdainful of money, content with his bright sword and his lifelong animosities against Louis XIV". The result was an austere figure, inspiring respect and admiration rather than affection.

Sicco van Goslinga, one of the Dutch field deputies who worked very close with Eugene during his campaigns with Marlborough, described him in his memoires as follows:

He had untameable courage and outdid himself during battle and in all undertakings where vigorous action was required. But he was less skilled in matters requiring brainwork, perseverance, prudence and constant attention, like when it was necessary to take up a defensive position, carefully supply it with everything necessary for its preservation and watch over its security. He was unable to concern himself with [logistical] ancillary matters, which are so necessary for the security of an army. It was said that he needed a new army every year, implying that he had little concern for the lives of soldiers.

=== Memorials ===
==== Places and monuments ====
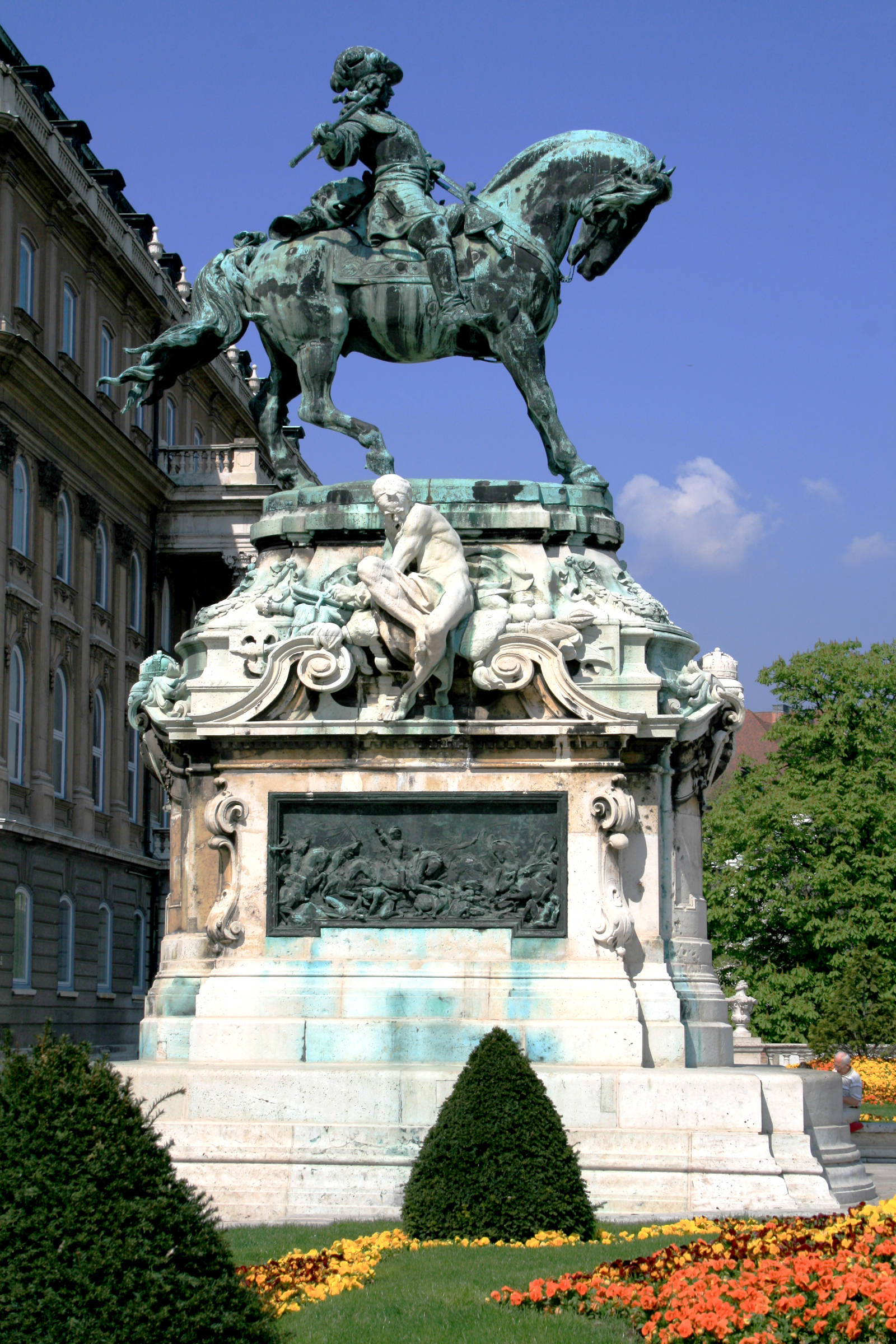
Eugene's statue, Buda Castle, Budapest, Hungary.

- A huge equestrian statue in the centre of Vienna commemorates Eugene's achievements. It is inscribed on one side, 'To the wise counsellor of three Emperors', and on the other, 'To the glorious conqueror of Austria's enemies'.
- A prominent equestrian statue of Eugene sculpted by József Róna overlooks the Danube Promenade from the royal gardens of Buda Castle in Budapest. Erected in 1900, it was originally meant as a placeholder for a planned equestrian statue of Franz Joseph I, which was ultimately never completed.
- Prinz-Eugen-Kapelle, a chapel located at the northern corner of St. Stephen's Cathedral in Vienna
- Prinz-Eugen-Straße a street in Vienna in use since 1890; Until 1911 a street in Döbling was also named Prinz-Eugen-Straße, since then the street connects Schwarzenbergplatz with the Wiedner Gürtel leading past the Belvedere Palace.
- Strada Eugeniu de Savoya, a street in central part of Timișoara, Romania and the nearby house of Prinz Eugene of Savoy, built in 1817, over the old entrance gate of the Timișoara, used by the general when entering in the conquered city in 1716.

==== Warships ====
Several ships have been named in Eugene's honour:

- SMS Prinz Eugen, an Austro-Hungarian ironclad warship built in 1862
- SMS Prinz Eugen, an Austro-Hungarian ironclad warship built in the 1870s
- SMS Prinz Eugen, an Austro-Hungarian battleship of World War I launched in 1912
- HMS Prince Eugene, a Royal Navy monitor
- Eugenio di Savoia, an Italian Navy light cruiser
- Prinz Eugen (later USS Prinz Eugen), a German Navy heavy cruiser of World War II launched in 1938

==== Other ====
- 7th SS Volunteer Mountain Division Prinz Eugen, a German mountain infantry division of the Waffen-SS. It was formed in 1941 from Volksdeutsche volunteers and conscripts from the Banat, Independent State of Croatia, Hungary and Romania. It was initially named SS-Freiwilligen-Division Prinz Eugen (SS-Volunteer Division Prinz Eugen).
- Panzer-Regiment 33, part of the 9th Panzer Division was in 1943 officially redesignated Panzer-Regiment Prinz Eugen.
- Prinz Eugen von Savoyen Prize, a prize awarded by the University of Vienna during the Nazi era in Austria rewarding "ethnic German culture".
- Eugene is the subject of the folksong "Prinz Eugen, der edle Ritter"

== Arms ==
Coat of arms of Prince Eugene of Savoy

== Ancestry ==
Genealogy

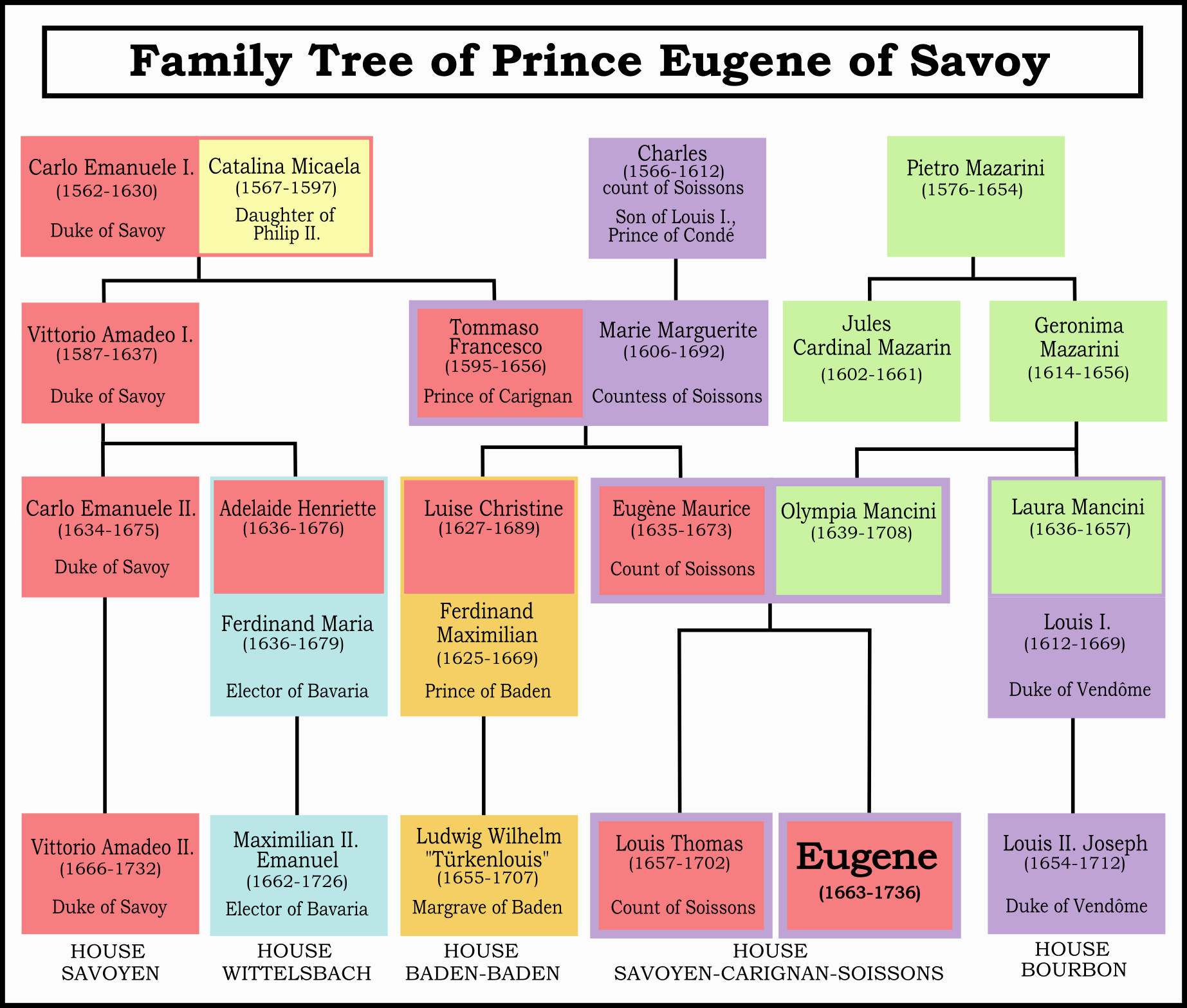
Genealogy of Prince Eugene, showing his close relationships with the French royal family and the family of Cardinal Mazarin. Eugene never married and had no children.

== See also ==
- 20 euro Baroque commemorative coin
- 7th SS Volunteer Mountain Division Prinz Eugen
- Louis William, Margrave of Baden-Baden
- Prinz Eugen, der edle Ritter

Preceded by Maximilian II Emanuel of Bavaria	Governor of the Habsburg Netherlands; 1716–1725	Succeeded by Count Wirich Philipp von Daun
Preceded by Heinrich Franz Count von Mansfeld	President of the Court War Council; 1703–1736	Succeeded by Lothar Joseph Count Königsegg
