= Prinz Eugen, der edle Ritter =

Austrian-German folksong

- Folksong
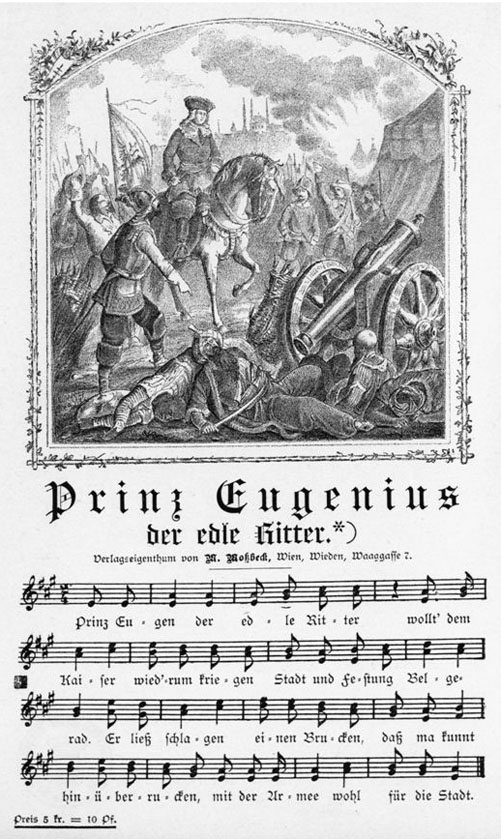
- Language: German
- Melody: Als Chursachsen das vernommen (1683)
- Composed: unknown

"Prinz Eugen, der edle Ritter" (Prince Eugene, the noble knight) is an Austrian-German folksong about the victory of Prince Eugene of Savoy in 1717 during the Austro-Turkish War (1716–1718). It tells of the bravery of Prince Eugene, his companion Prince Ludwig who lost his life in the battle, and their soldiers in defeating the Turks and recovering the city of Belgrade for the Holy Roman Empire. The oldest known record of the song comes from a handwritten songbook of 1719. The lyricist is unknown.

== Theme ==
The song is a narrative of the Siege of Belgrade (1717). The text diverts from historical accuracy in two aspects. The day of the final assault on the defenders is given as the 21 August although it was 16 August. Second, the song tells of the death of one Prince Louis (Prinz Ludewig). Eugene had two brothers named Louis but none of them fell at Belgrade. The younger one, Louis Julius (1660–1683) who had entered Imperial service prior to Eugene was killed by Crimean Tatars at Petronell, whereas the older one, Louis Thomas (1657–1702) had died at the Siege of Landau (1702).

== Background and legacy ==
The author of the song is unknown. The melody derives from "Als Chursachsen das vernommen, dass der Turk vor Wien was kommen" (When the Electorate of Saxony heard that the Turks were at Vienna) (1683) and has also later been adopted in the period before the German revolutions of 1848–1849 to "Ob wir rote, gelbe Kragen" (Whether we [wear] red or yellow collars), the Ob wir rote, gelbe Kragen from 1845 by Adalbert Harnisch. Josef Strauss composed in 1865 his Prinz Eugen March, Op. 186, for the unveiling of a statue of Prince Eugene at the Heldenplatz in Vienna; it uses elements of the folksong. Likewise, Carl Loewe quotes this folk song in the last stanza of his art song "Prinz Eugen, der edle Ritter", set to words by Ferdinand Freiligrath.

During the German occupation of Serbia in 1941, Nazi-controlled Radio Belgrade used bars from Prinz Eugen, der edle Ritter as its interval signal. The signal included the line referring to the "city and fortress of Belgrade", an allusion to the Habsburg capture of the city in 1717.

== Lyrics ==
| German (Original) | English (Translation) |
|---|---|
| Prinz Eugen der edle Ritter, wollt dem Kaiser wied'rum kriegen Stadt und Festung Belgerad! |: Er ließ schlagen einen Brukken, daß man kunt hinüberrucken mit der Armee, wohl, für die Stadt. :| | Prince Eugene, the noble knight, wished to recover for the Emperor the city and fortress of Belgrade. He had a bridge built so they could cross with the army to the city. |
| Als der Brucken war'd geschlagen, daß man kunnt mit Stuck und Wagen; Frei passir'n den Donaufluß, |: Bei Semlin schlug man das Lager, Alle Türken zu verjagen, Ihn'n zum Spott und zum Verdruß. :| | When the bridge had been built and cannon and wagons could be transported across the Danube, they set up camp at Semlin, in order to drive all the Turks away, to their shame and vexation. |
| Am einundzwanzigsten August soeben Kam ein Spion bei Sturm und Regen, Schwur's dem Prinzen und zeigt's ihm an |: Daß die Türken futragieren, So viel, als man kunnt' verspüren, An die dreimalhunderttausend Mann. :| | Just on the 21st of August, a spy came through wind and rain. Under oath he showed him that the Turks were looking for food supplies. They were so many that one could have thought that they were up to three hundred thousand. |
| Als Prinz Eugenius dies vernommen, Ließ er gleich zusammenkommen Sein' Gen'ral und Feldmarschall. |: Er tät sie recht instruieren, Wie man sollt' die Truppen führen Und den Feind recht greifen an. :| | As soon as Prince Eugene learnt this, he immediately gathered his generals and field marshals. He instructed them how the troops should be manoeuvred and attack the enemy properly. |
| Bei der Parol' tät er befehlen, Daß man sollt' die Zwölfe zählen, Bei der Uhr um Mitternacht. |: Da sollt' all's zu Pferd aufsitzen, Mit dem Feinde zu scharmützen, Was zum Streit nur hätte Kraft. :| | As sign to attack he ordered to count the twelve chimes of the clock at midnight. Then all had to mount their horses and start skirmishes with the enemy who still had strength left. |
| Alles saß auch gleich zu Pferde, Jeder griff nach seinem Schwerte, Ganz still rückt man aus der Schanz; |: Die Musketier wie auch die Reiter; Täten alle tapfer streiten: Es war fürwahr ein schöner Tanz! :| | All got on their horses immediately, everyone unsheathed his sword and got out of the camp without saying a word. The musketeers and knights fought valiantly. It was really a beautiful dance! |
| Ihr Konstabler auf der Schanzen, Spielet auf zu diesem Tanzen; Mit Kartaunen groß und klein; Mit den großen, mit den kleinen Auf die Türken auf die Heiden, Daß sie laufen all' davon! | You, constables of the fortification, play up for this dance with your big and small cannons. With the big ones, with the small ones, shoot the Turks and heathens. Make them flee! |
| Prinz Eugenius auf der Rechten; Tät als wie ein Löwe fechten, Als Gen'ral und Feldmarschall. Prinz Ludewig ritt auf und nieder'. Halt't euch brav, ihr deutschen Brüder, Greift den Feind nur herzhaft an! | Prince Eugene attacked on the right flank and fought like a lion, as the general and field marshal. Prince Ludwig rode to and fro. Fight bravely, German brothers, attack the enemy with all your heart. |
| Prinz Ludewig, der mußt' aufgeben Seinen Geist und junges Leben, Ward getroffen von dem Blei. Prinz Eugen war sehr betrübet, Weil er ihn so sehr geliebet, Ließ ihn bring'n nach Peterwardein. | Prince Ludwig breathed his last, he had to abandon his young life. He was shot by a lead bullet. Prince Eugene was shattered, because he loved him so much. He had him carried to Peterwardein. |
