= Laurenz Janscha =

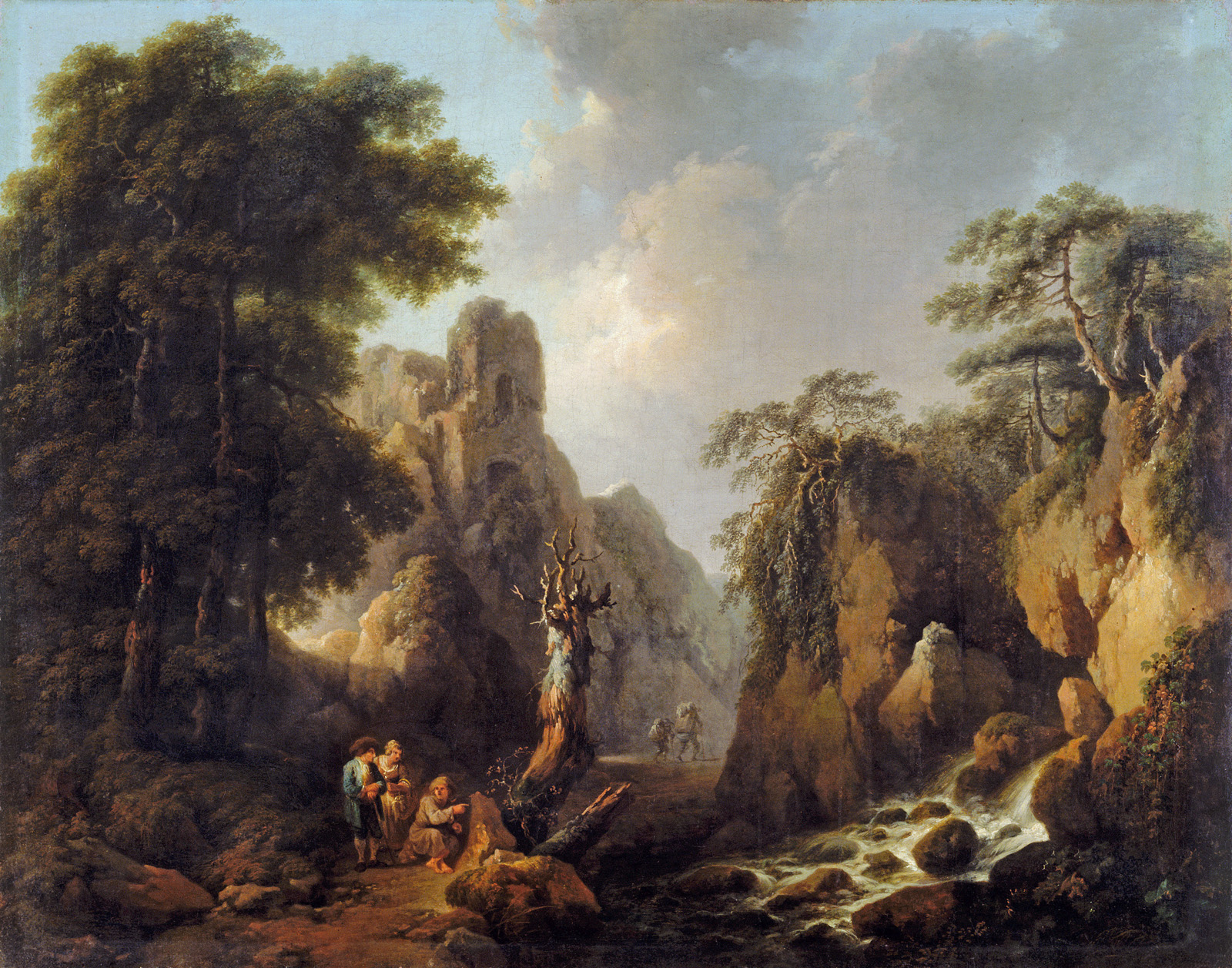
Imaginary Landscape with Ruins

Laurenz Janscha, originally Lovro Janša (30 June 1749 – 1 April 1812), was a Slovenian-born Austrian landscape painter and engraver.

== Life and work ==
He was born in Bresnitz to farmers Matija Janša (1683–1752) and Lucija Debellak (1705–1781). Around 1770, he was accepted as a student at a copper engraving school in Vienna, where he was trained in landscape drawing by Johann Christian Brand. Later, he studied with Franz Edmund Weirotter. After 1780, he also worked with etching.

In 1785, he worked for the Viennese publishing company, Artaria; producing seven watercolors for their Collection de 50 vues de la ville de Vienne. As a result, he came to focus on producing vedute of Vienna and its surroundings, many of which were engraved by Johann Ziegler. He created a massive panorama of the city in 1803. It was initially shown at the Wurstelprater, then toured to several cities.

In 1797, he had succeeded Carl Philipp Schallhas as the teacher of landscape drawing at the Academy of Fine Arts. In 1806, following the death of Friedrich August Brand, he was appointed head of the Master Class. He was named a professor in 1811. He died in 1812 in Vienna.

His eldest brother, Anton, started out as a painter, but gave it up to become a beekeeper, and was a pioneer of modern apiculture.

== Sources ==
- Peter Pötschner, "Janscha, Laurenz" in: Neue Deutsche Biographie 10 (1974), pp. 339 f. (Online)
- Stefan Grathoff, Laurenz Janscha @ the Institut für Geschichtliche Landeskunde, University of Mainz
- Biography from the Biographisches Lexikon des Kaiserthums Oesterreich @ WikiSource
