= Selo pri Žirovnici =

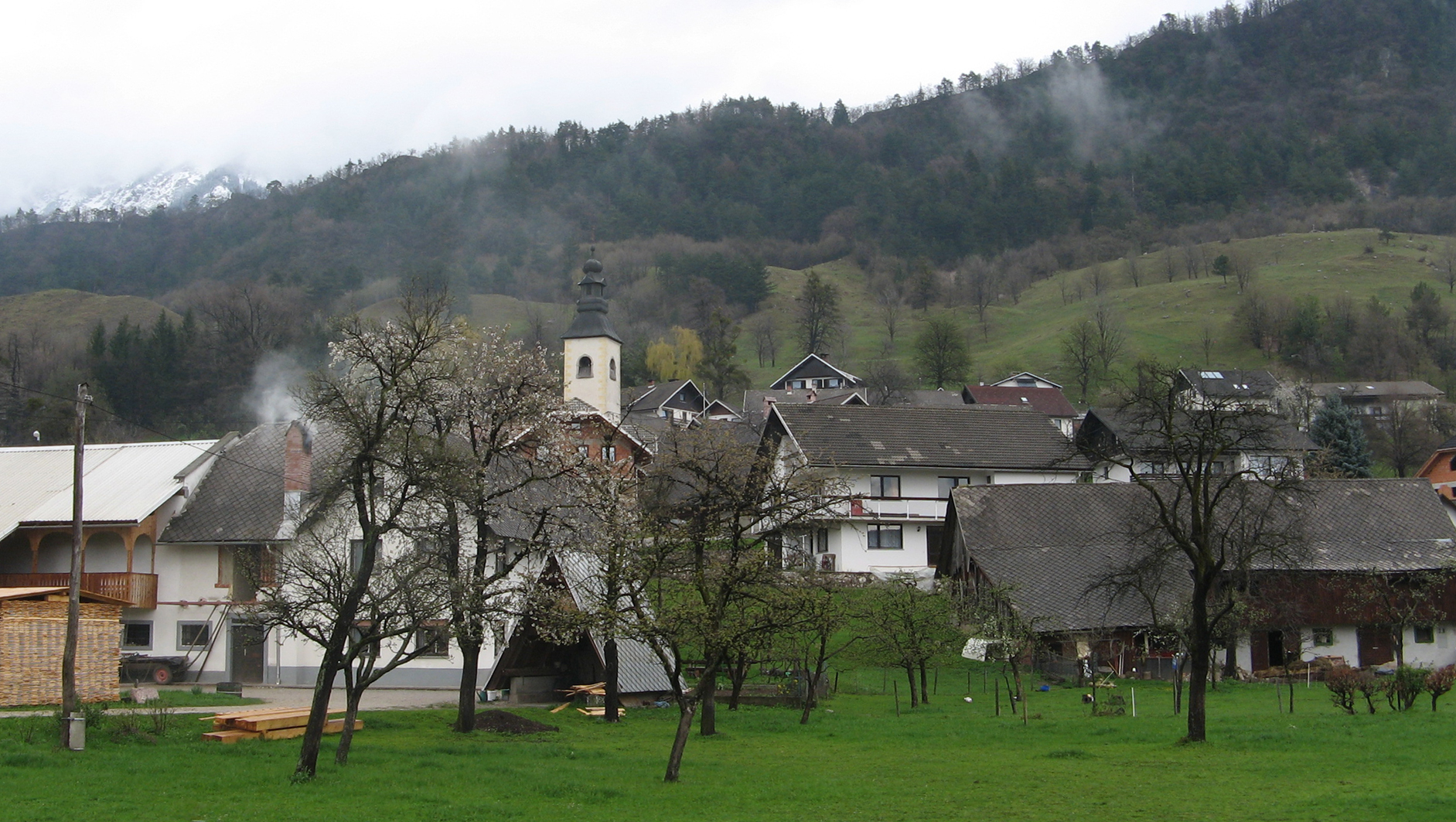

- Location in Slovenia
- Coordinates: 46°23′57″N 14°8′35″E
- Country: Slovenia
- Traditional region: Upper Carniola
- Statistical region: Upper Carniola
- Municipality: Žirovnica
- Elevation: 552 m (1,811 ft)

Population (2002)
  - Total: 294

Selo pri Žirovnici (pronounced [ˈsɛːlɔ pɾi ʒiˈɾoːu̯nitsi]) is one of ten villages in the Municipality of Žirovnica in the Upper Carniola region of Slovenia. It lies on the slopes of the Reber range between Žirovnica and Zabreznica and is more or less a continuous settlement with Zabreznica. There are open fields south of the village.

== Name ==
The name of the settlement was changed from Selo to Selo pri Žirovnici in 1953.

== Church ==
The church of St. Cantius was first mentioned in 1468 and is a Baroque structure with a belfry from 1764, but there is evidence that it replaced an earlier Romanesque structure. Fragments of 15th-century frescoes survive on the southern wall. The interior of the church was renovated in 1955.

== Mass grave ==
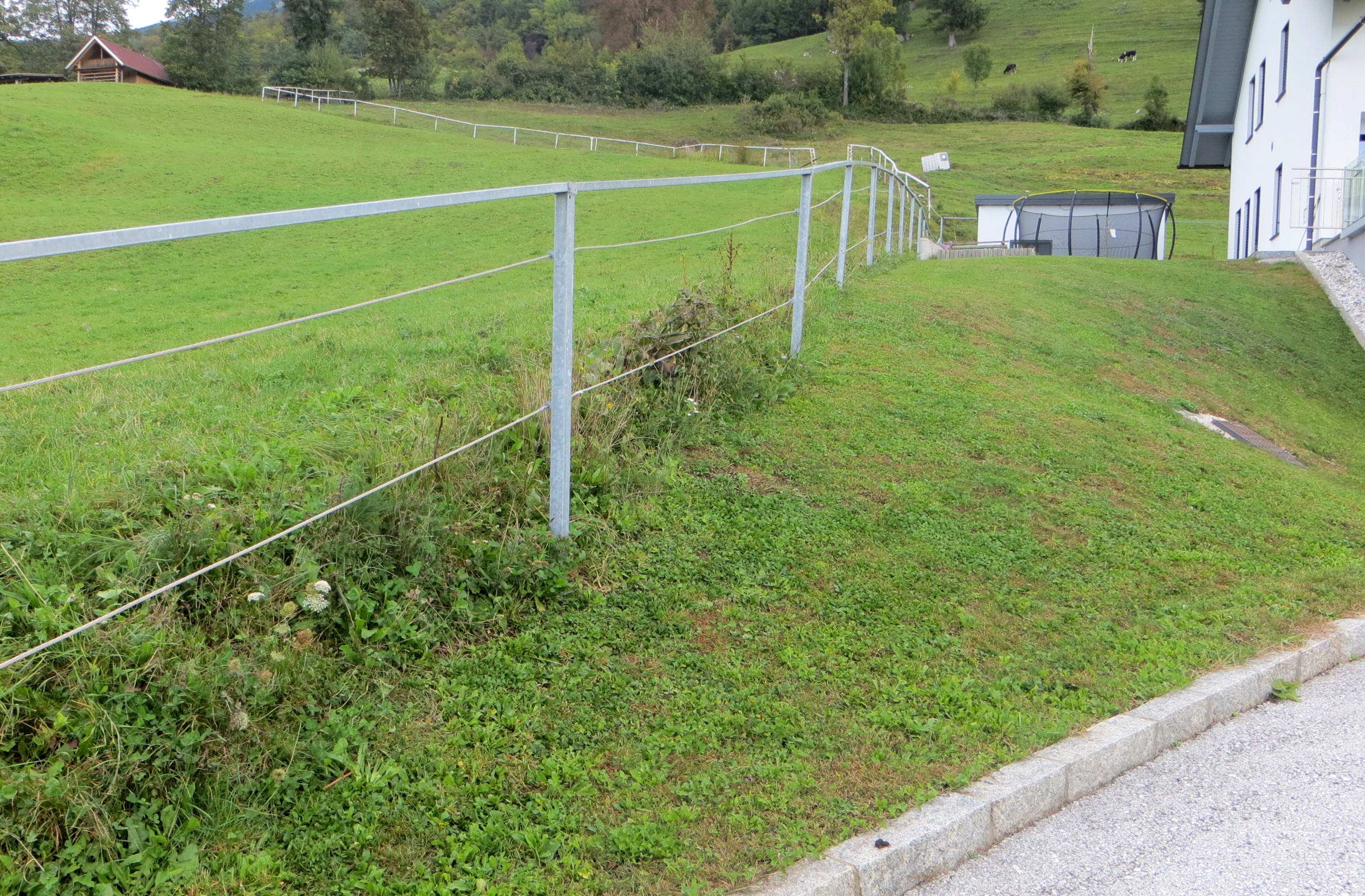
Selo pri Žirovnici Mass Grave

Selo pri Žirovnici is the site of a mass grave from the period immediately after the Second World War. The Selo pri Žirovnici Mass Grave (Slovene: Grobišče Selo pri Žirovnici), also known as the Pohar Meadow Mass Grave (Grobišče Poharjev travnik), is located in a meadow next to a fence separating it from a pasture, northeast of the house at Selo pri Žirovnici no. 114. The grave site is marked by raised earth. It contains the remains of six Croatian soldiers murdered between 14 and 18 May 1945.
