= Heinrich Carl Brandt =

German painter (1724–1787)

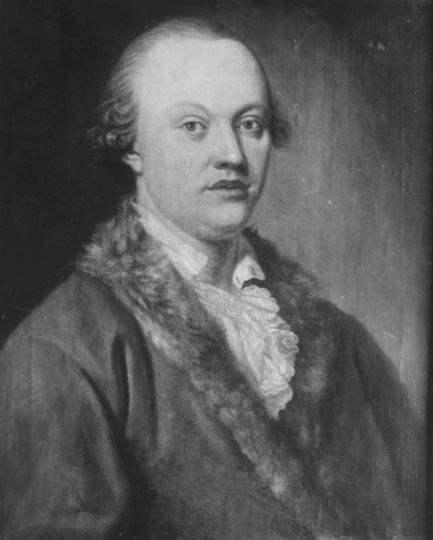
Self-portrait (date unknown)

Heinrich Carl Brandt (11 November 1724, in Vienna – 6 May 1787, in Munich) was an Austrian-German court painter. He created portraits of several noble families in Mainz, Mannheim and Munich. He is probably best known for the ones commissioned by the House of Wittelsbach.

== Life and work ==
There is no reliable information about his family, although the landscape painter, Christian Hilfgott Brand, is generally believed to have been his father. From 1739 to 1745, he studied with Jacob van Schuppen at the Academy of Fine Arts, Vienna. He then learned portrait painting in the master class of Martin van Meytens, who was the court painter for Empress Maria Theresa.

He had planned to complete his studies in Paris, but on his way there, he stopped in Frankfurt to paint a portrait of the diplomat, Johann Karl Philipp von Cobenzl, who was pleased with the results and recommended him to the Elector, Johann Friedrich Karl von Ostein. He was also pleased, and appointed him a court painter with an annual salary of 600 Florins, plus food and lodging. He remained there through 1760. In addition to his court work, he accepted apprentices for training.

In 1761, the Elector sent him to Mannheim to order stamps from the mint. While there, he visited the art galleries at Mannheim Palace and was so impressed by the works in their collection, he decided to move there to study them. In 1764, he received another appointment as court painter, for Charles Theodore, Elector of Bavaria. Five years later, when the private Mannheimer Zeichnungsakademie became a state institution, he was named its first Professor and Secretary. During his time there, he was married, but little is known of his wife or children, if any.

Despite a regular salary, plus additional payments per portrait, in the mid-1770s he began to suffer from financial problems. He was said to live a lavish lifestyle, with several mistresses, and his wife apparently left him. The final blow came in 1778, when the Elector moved his court to Munich. He followed, three years later, but his situation failed to improve, due to the higher cost of living there, and a drinking problem, which sometimes left him unable to work.

In 1787, he developed a close friendship with Gabriele Corva, the young daughter of the Elector's Castle Keeper, Franz Corva. The relationship was criticized as immoral, and brought his entire lifestyle into discussion. In May 1787, a loan was cancelled, not long before a major bill of exchange was coming due. Shortly after, he committed suicide by poisoning. He left a suicide note on the cancellation letter that read "Dieser Brief ist die Ursach meines Todes" (This letter is the cause of my death).

== Selected portraits ==
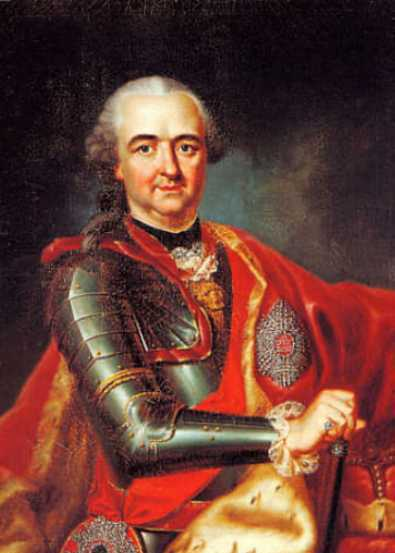
Charles Theodore, Elector of Bavaria

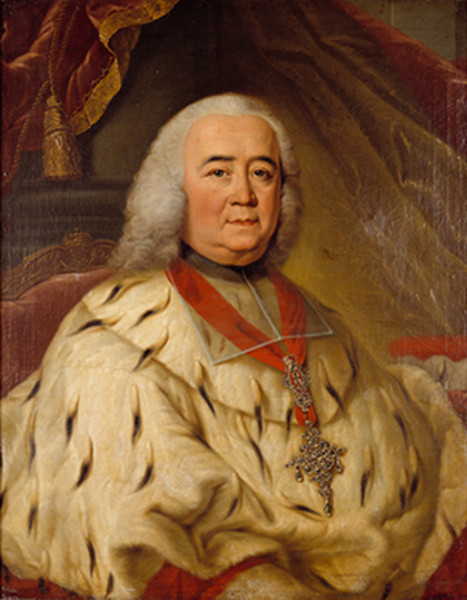
Johann Friedrich Karl von Ostein

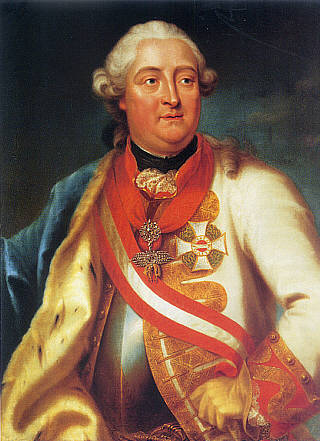
Frederick Michael, Count Palatine of Zweibrücken

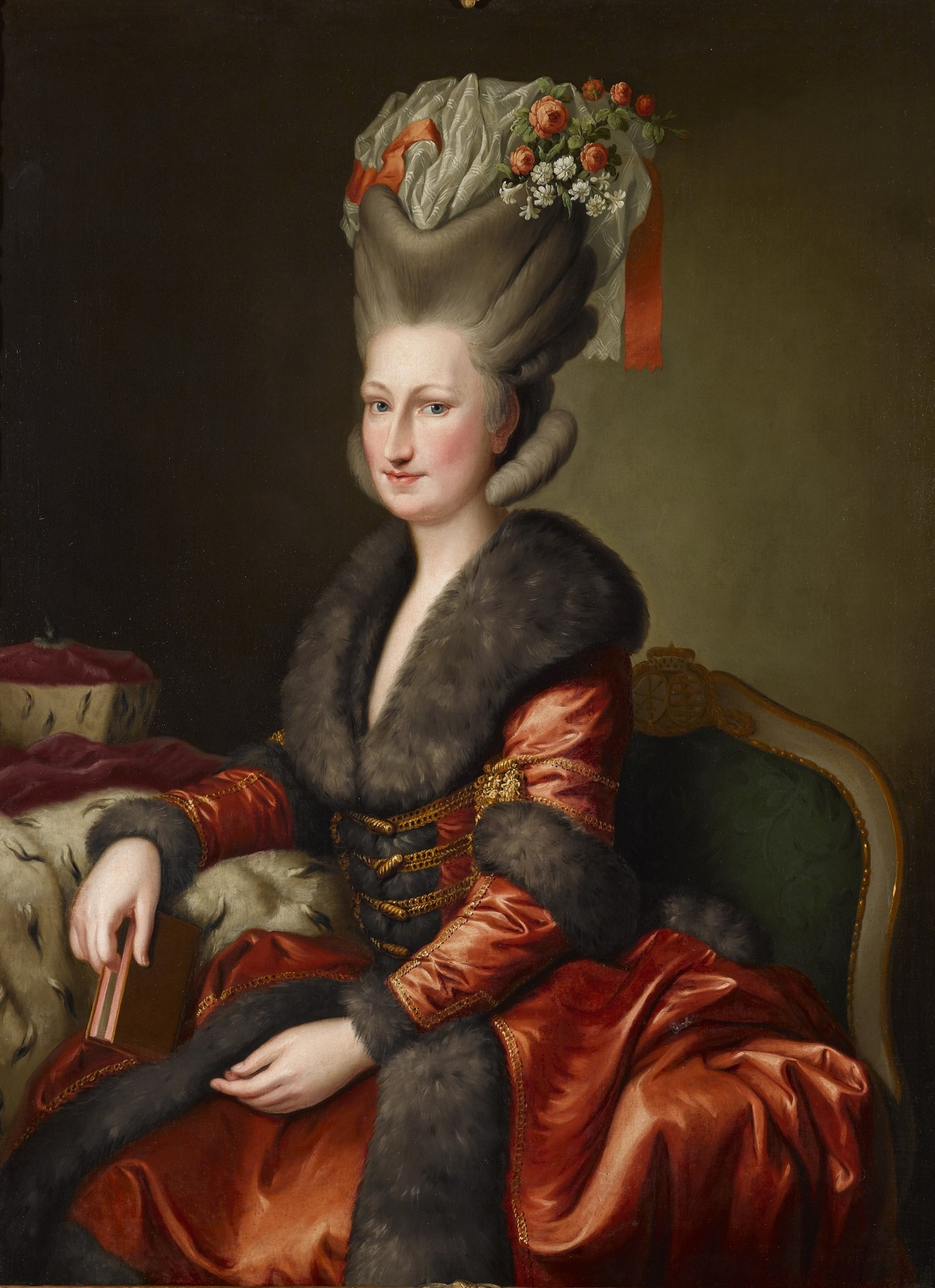
Amalie of Zweibrücken-Birkenfeld

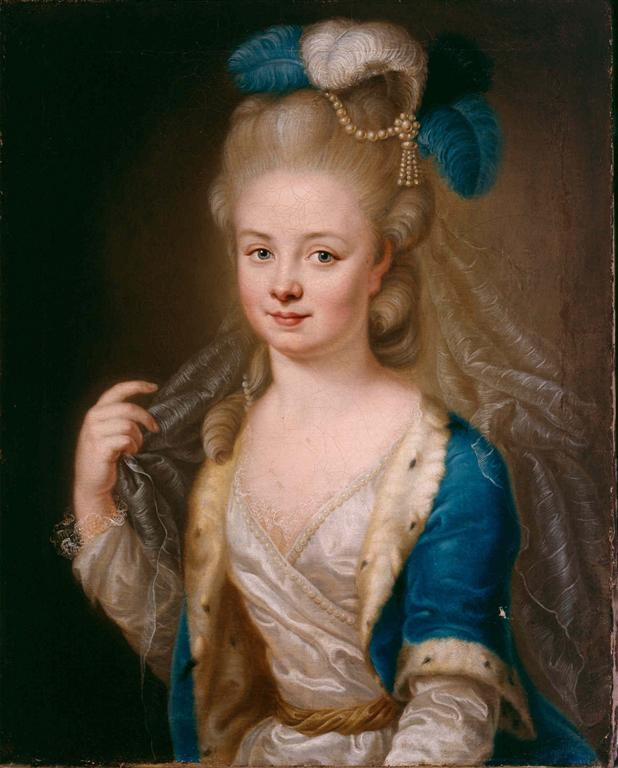
Countess Palatine Maria Anna of Zweibrücken-Birkenfeld
