= Jacob van Schuppen =

French-Austrian painter (1670–1751)

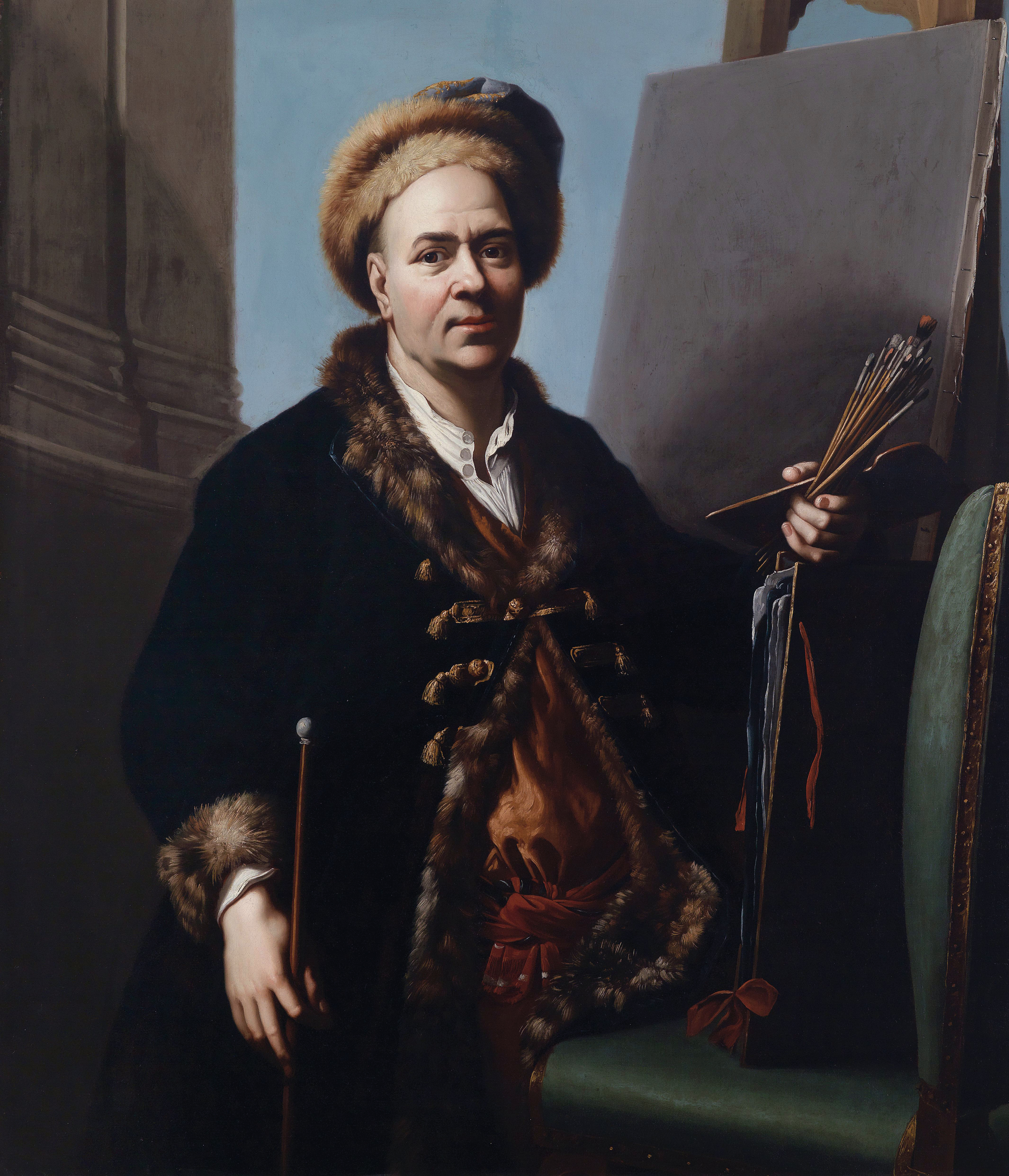
- Self-portrait
- Born: 26 January 1670; Fontainebleau
- Died: 29 January 1751 (aged 81); Vienna
- Known for: Painting

Jacob van Schuppen (26 January 1670 – 29 January 1751) was a French-Austrian painter who was known for his portraits, history paintings and genre scenes. He was court painter in Vienna.

== Biography ==
Jacob van Schuppen was born in Fontainebleau, France, as the son of Elisabeth de Mesmaker and the Flemish painter-engraver Pieter van Schuppen, who was originally from Antwerp. He worked in the Netherlands before moving to Vienna. He was taught to paint by his father and his uncle Nicolas de Largillière.

In 1719, he was registered in Lunéville, but he moved in the same year to Vienna, where he became court painter. In 1725, he was appointed director of the Academy of Fine Arts Vienna, when it was refounded by Emperor Charles VI as the k.k. Hofakademie der Maler, Bildhauer und Baukunst (Imperial and Royal Court Academy of painters, sculptors and architecture).

In 1730, he taught Adam Friedrich Oeser and he was an influence on Daniel Gran. Christian Hilfgott Brand (father of Johann Christian Brand) and Carl Heinrich Brandt were among his pupils.

== Gallery ==
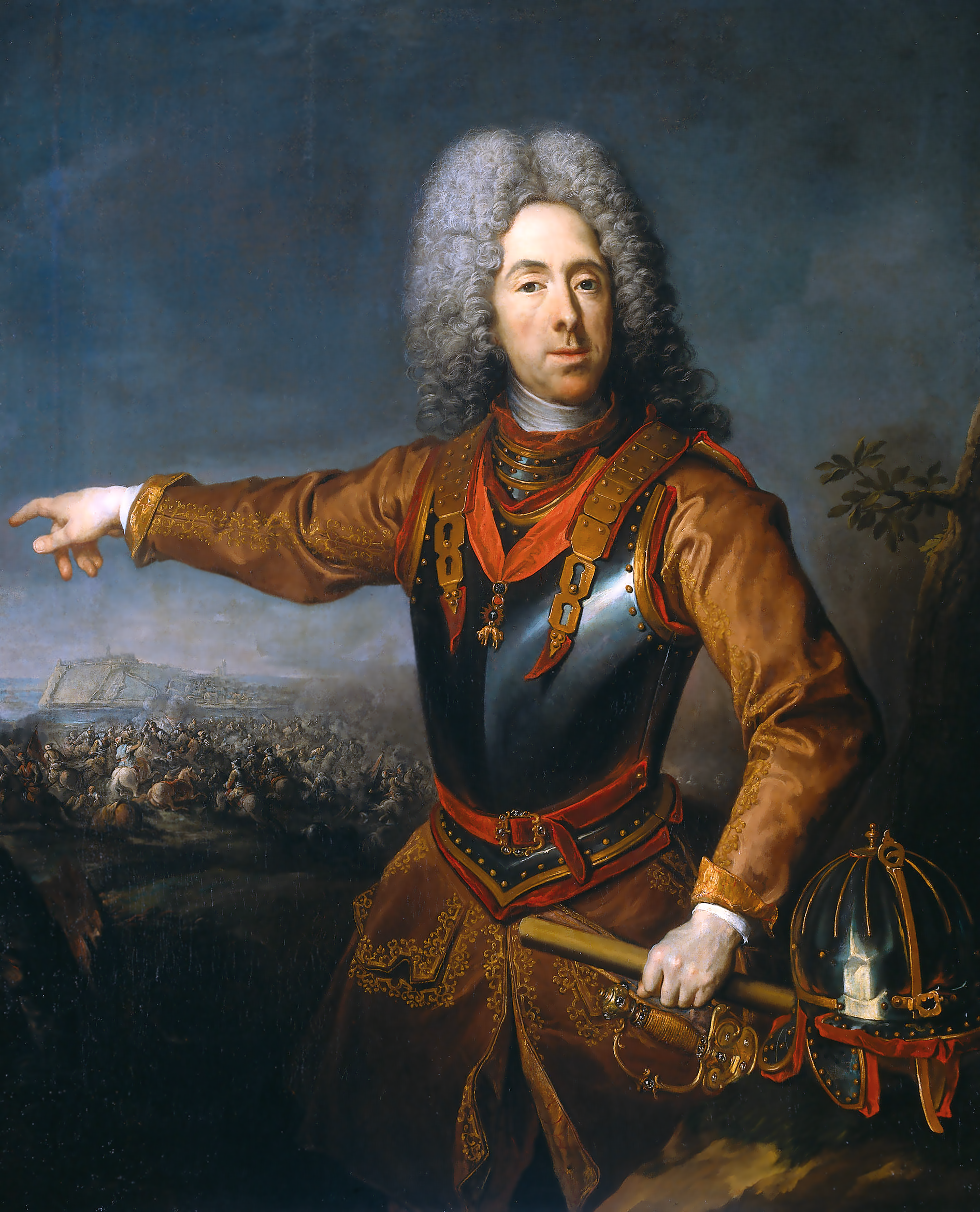
Portrait of Eugene of Savoy, 1718
