= Rodine, Žirovnica =

Rodine
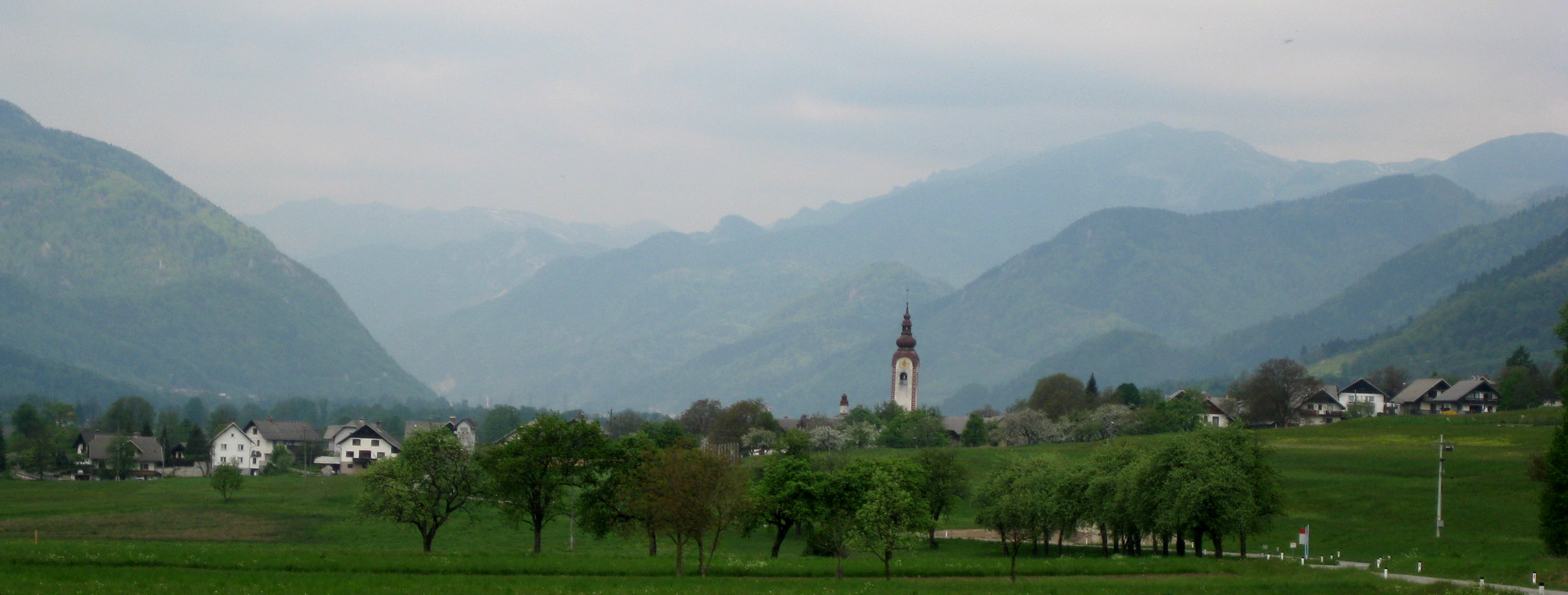

- Location in Slovenia
- Coordinates: 46°23′4″N 14°10′34″E
- Country: Slovenia
- Traditional region: Upper Carniola
- Statistical region: Upper Carniola
- Municipality: Žirovnica
- Elevation: 544 m (1,785 ft)

Population (2002)
  - Total: 340

Rodine (pronounced [ˈɾoːdinɛ]; German: Rodein) is one of ten villages in the Municipality of Žirovnica in the Upper Carniola region of Slovenia. In recent years, the settlement has grown northwards, further up the hill side and westwards to reach right to the outskirts of Smokuč. There are open fields and forests to the east and south of the village.

== History ==
There is evidence of Roman settlement in the area of Rodine with the remains of a Roman farm (villa rustica) in Ključi. This was partially excavated in 1959, and finds show that it was settled from the late 1st century AD until the 5th century. Remains of three buildings and a number of small objects were found during excavation. Some are now on display at the Jalen House.

== Church ==
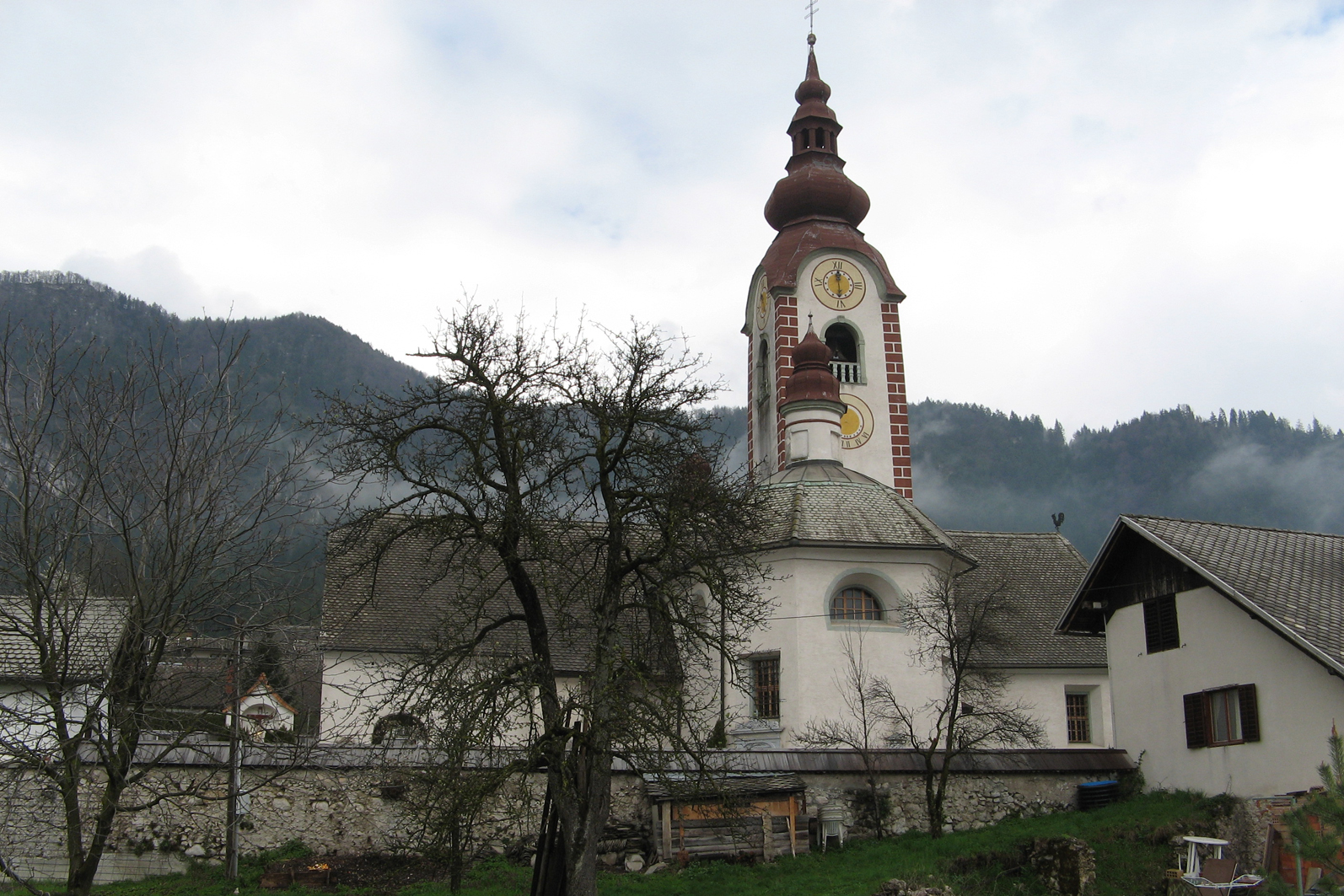
St. Clement's Church

The village church is the Church of St. Clement. There is evidence that a religious building was built on the site in the second half of the 10th century. A later gothic structure burned down and the Baroque church seen today was built in 1692. There is a tomb under the church that allegedly contains the remains of St. Clement, who was tortured and killed in Crimea, Ukraine, and whose bones were found in Rodine. The church was renovated in 1876 to repair extensive damage to the roof and spire. The house where the Slovene writer Janez Jalen was born, now a small museum, is in Rodine as well.
