= Municipality of Žirovnica =

Municipality of Slovenia

Municipality of Žirovnica Občina Žirovnica
- Municipality
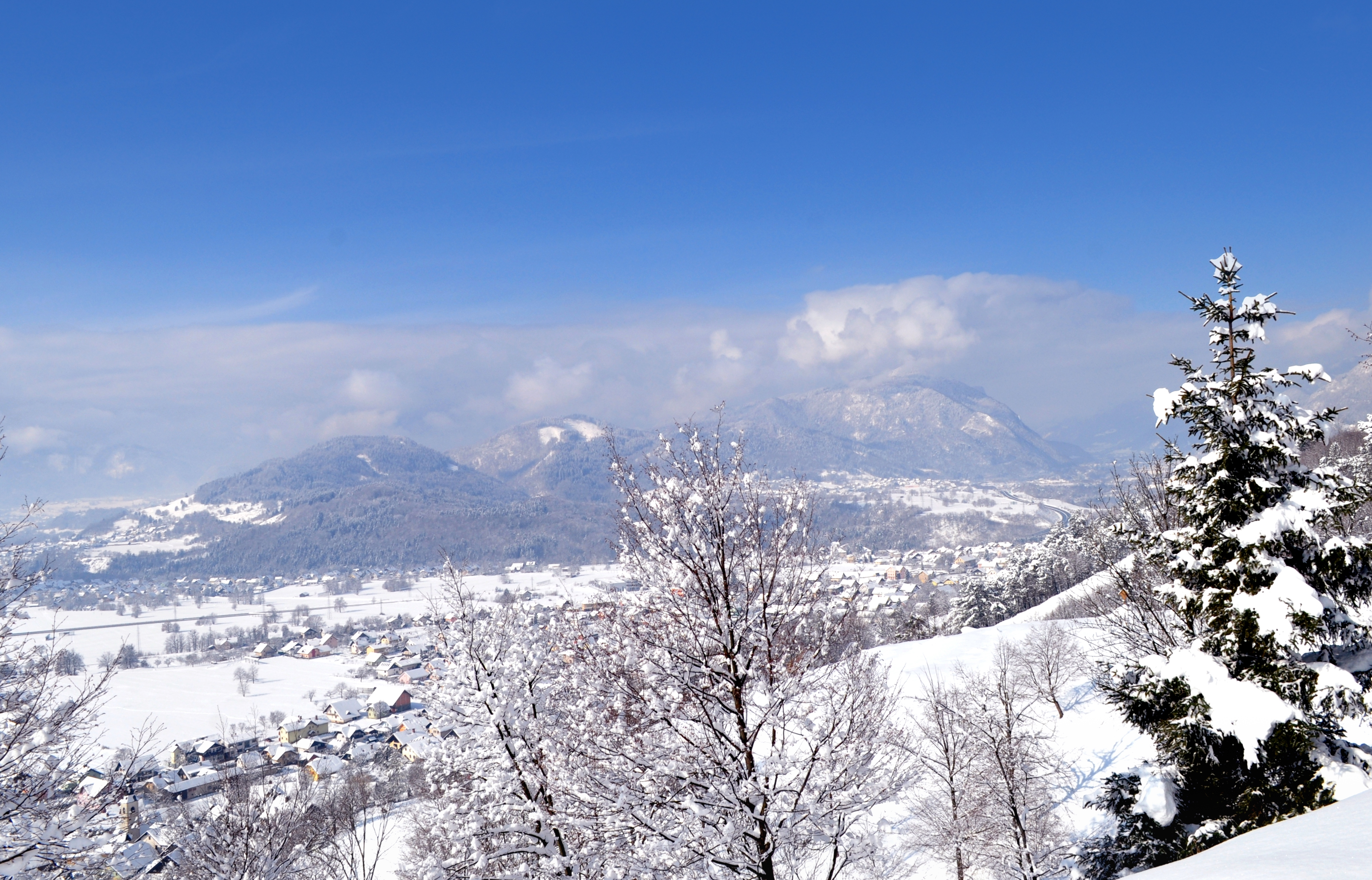

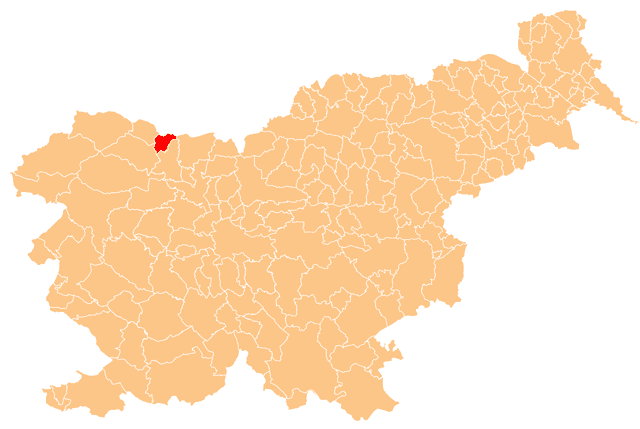
- Location of the Municipality of Žirovnica in Slovenia
- Coordinates: 46°24′N 14°08′E
- Country: Slovenia

Government
  - Mayor: Leopold Pogačar

Area
  - Total: 42.6 km^{2} (16.4 sq mi)

Population (2020)
  - Total: 4,425
  - Density: 104/km^{2} (269/sq mi)
- Time zone: UTC+01 (CET)
  - Summer (DST): UTC+02 (CEST)
- Website: www.zirovnica.si

The Municipality of Žirovnica (pronounced [ʒiˈɾɔ́ːwnitsa]; Slovene: Občina Žirovnica) is a municipality in Slovenia. The seat of the municipality is the village of Breznica.

In the Završnica Valley, behind the Reber range that overlooks the villages, the first public hydroelectric plant in Slovenia was built in 1914. In 1952, after building a 60 m dam (the highest dam in Slovenia to date) in the Kavčke Gorge, a second hydroelectric plant opened in nearby Moste. This was the first hydroelectric plant to operate on the Sava River.

== Geography ==
It is located in the traditional Upper Carniola region, on the southern slope of the Karawanks mountain range, along the border with Austria (Carinthia). The municipality borders the municipalities of Jesenice to the west, Bled and Radovljica to the south, and Tržič to the east as well as Austria to the north.

=== Settlements ===
In addition to the municipal seat of Breznica, the municipality also includes the following settlements:

- Breg
- Doslovče
- Moste
- Rodine
- Selo pri Žirovnici
- Smokuč
- Vrba
- Zabreznica
- Žirovnica

== Notable people ==
A number of figures important to Slovenes come from the Municipality of Žirovnica: the poet France Prešeren, the linguist Matija Čop, Archbishop Anton Vovk, the pioneering bee-keeper Anton Janša, and the writers Janez Jalen and Fran Saleški Finžgar. Bronze busts of all five have been put up in front of the school in Zabreznica. There is a well-marked trail through the villages called The Cultural Heritage Route. This can be followed to visit certain monuments associated with the above figures (e.g., the houses where Prešeren, Čop, Finžgar, and Jalen were born, all of which are small museums, Janša's beehive) and a number of other historical and cultural monuments in the area.
