= Emanuel Stöckler =

Austrian painter (1819–1893)

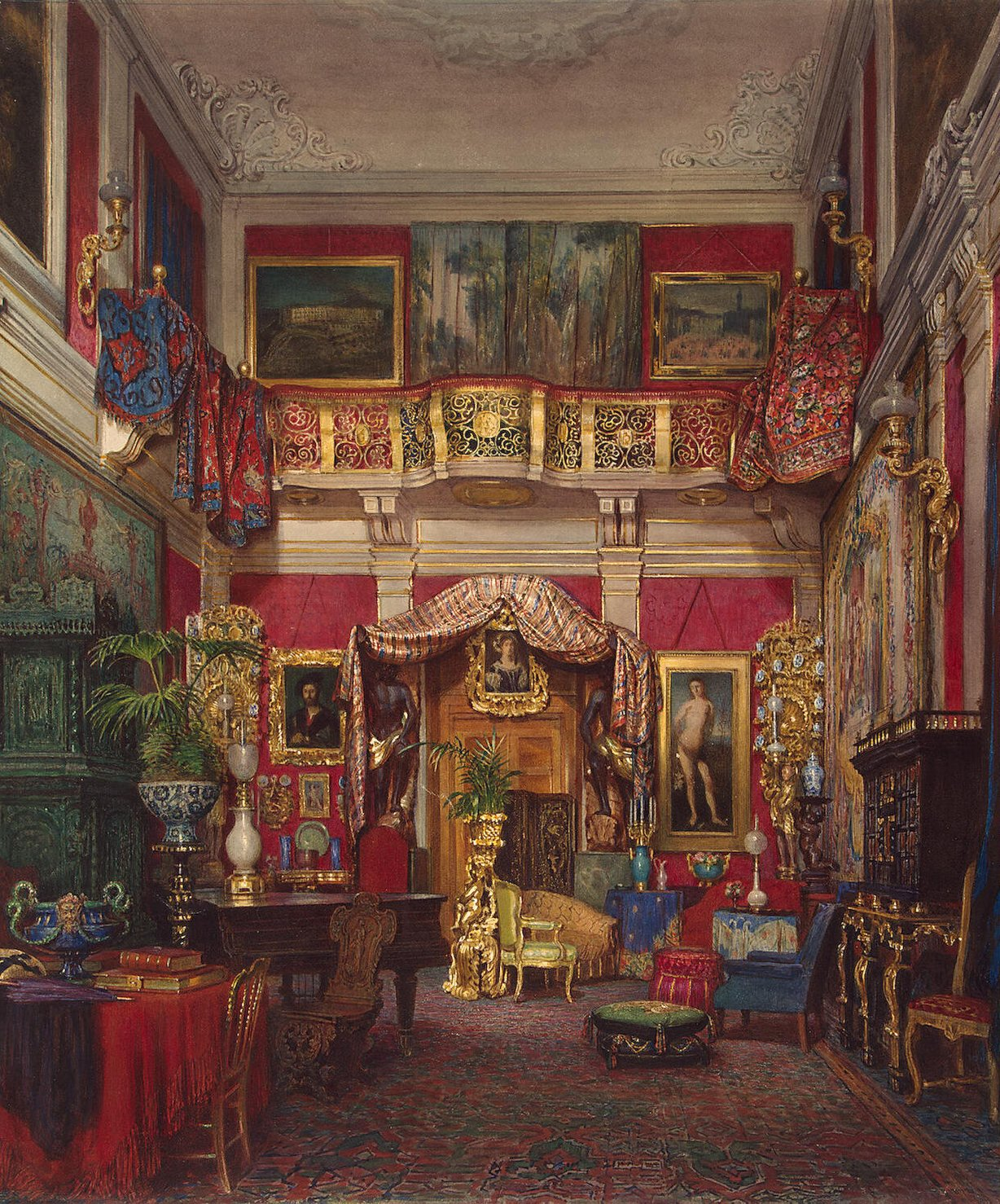
A Room in the Villa di Quarto, Florence

Emanuel Stöckler (24 December 1819 – 5 November 1893) was an Austrian painter, notable for his interior portraits.

== Life and work ==
Stöckler was born on 24 December 1819, Nikolsburg, Moravia, Austrian Empire. His father was a pharmacist who wanted him to become a doctor. His interests took another turn, however, and he studied at the Academy of Fine Arts, Vienna, with the landscape painter, Thomas Ender, and Joseph Mössmer. In 1838 he was awarded the Gundel-Prize for excellence and began participating in the academy's exhibits, which he continued to do annually for many years. In the mid-1840s, he went on a lengthy study trip that took him to Switzerland, Italy, and Istanbul.

On the way home, he lingered in Bucharest, where he painted for Gheorghe Bibescu, the Prince of Wallachia. In 1859, he had a studio in Venice. From 1875 to 1880, he served as a court painter in Saint Petersburg, at the behest of the Tsarina, Maria Alexandrovna. Upon her death, he returned to Vienna.

He became a member of the Vienna Künstlerhaus in 1876. Two years later, he presented the Institut für Österreichische Geschichtsforschung (historical research), with a collection of seals he had acquired from the estate of his cousin, Eduard Melly, an art historian who was one of the foremost experts on that subject. As a result, he was awarded the Knight's Cross of the Order of Franz Joseph. He died on 5 November 1893 in Bolzano.

During his lifetime, he was primarily known as a landscape painter, who created views from throughout Eastern and Southern Europe. At that time, trips to the Middle East were uncommon, so his Orientalist genre scenes were quite popular. He was also an accomplished watercolourist. Today, his works are largely forgotten.

== Sources ==
- Emanuel Stöckler, from the Biographisches Lexikon des Kaiserthums Oesterreich @ WikiSource
- Emanuel Stöckler @ the Österreichisches Biographisches Lexikon
