= Moste, Žirovnica =

Moste

- Location in Slovenia
- Coordinates: 46°24′31″N 14°8′22″E
- Country: Slovenia
- Traditional region: Upper Carniola
- Statistical region: Upper Carniola
- Municipality: Žirovnica
- Elevation: 567 m (1,860 ft)

Population (2002)
  - Total: 546

Moste (pronounced [ˈmoːstɛ]) is one of ten villages in the Municipality of Žirovnica in the Upper Carniola region of Slovenia.

== Hydroelectric plant ==
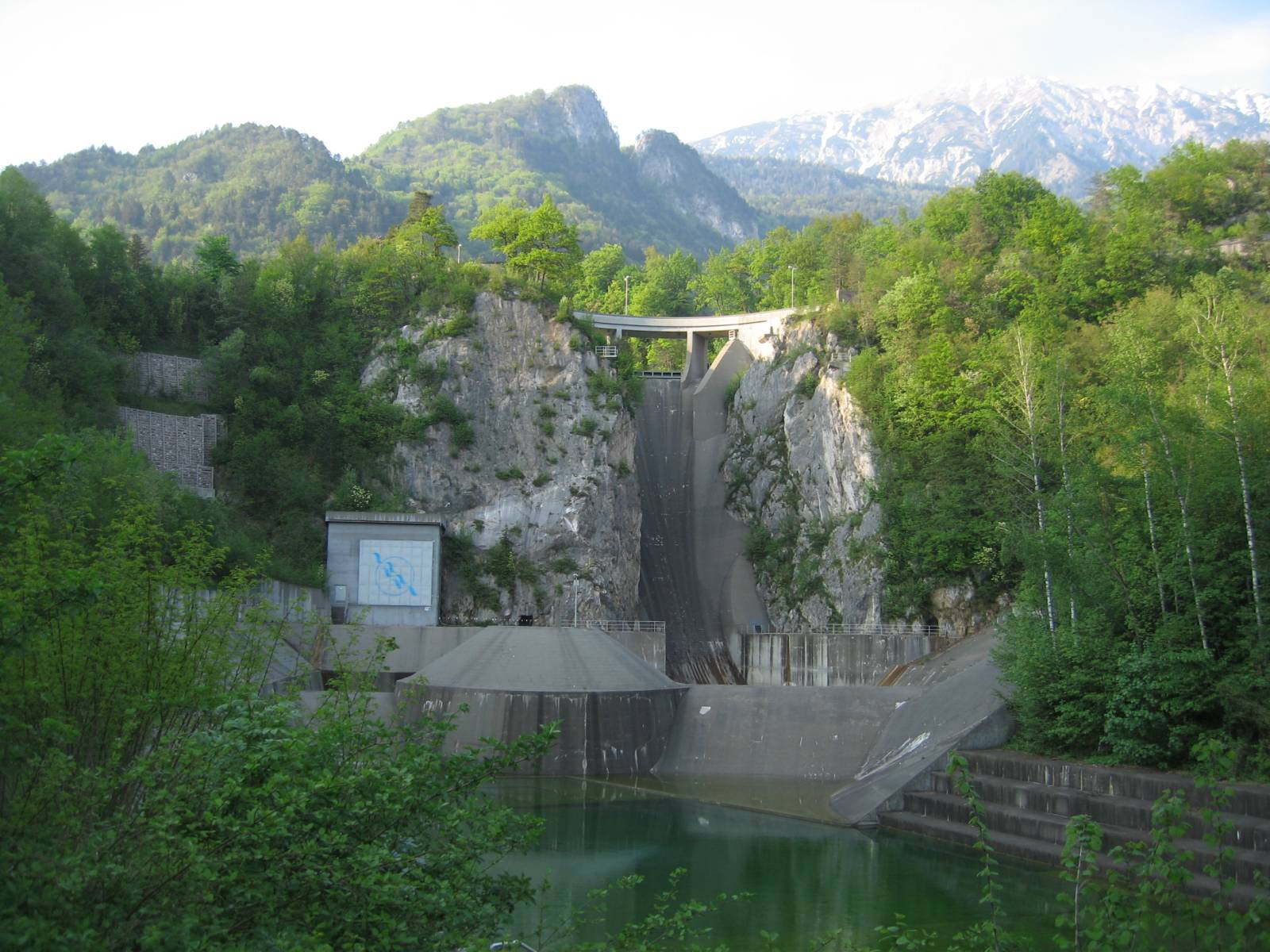
Moste hydroelectric dam in the Kavčke Gorge

Moste is the location of the Moste Hydroelectric Plant, the first hydro-electric power plant to have been built on the Sava Dolinka River. It has a 60-meter (200 ft) high dam (the highest dam in Slovenia to date) in the Kavčke Gorge, right before the Sava is joined by the Radovna. The plant was built using forced labor by political prisoners from camps set up after the Second World War.

== Church ==
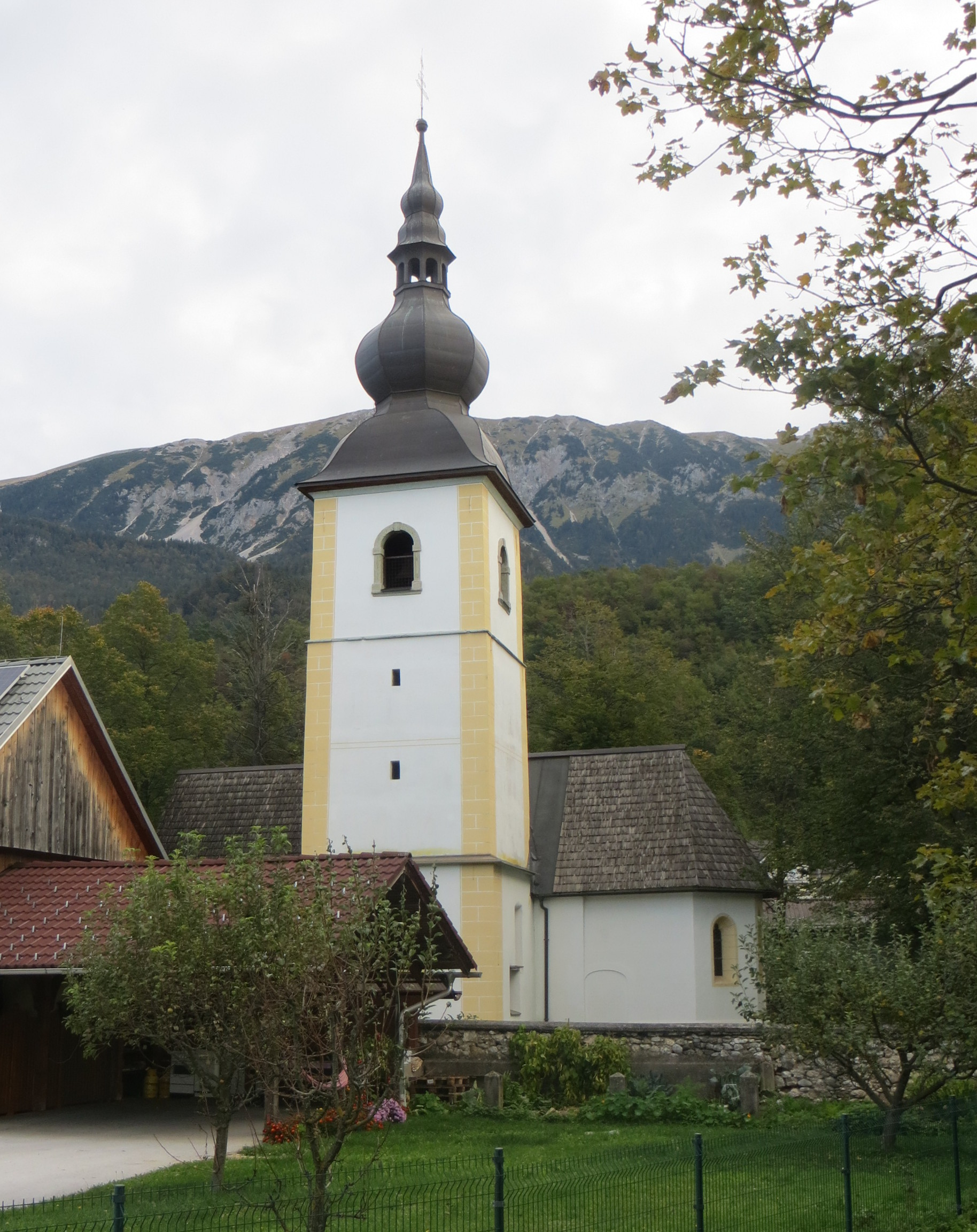
Saint Martin's Church

The church in the centre of the village is dedicated to Saint Martin. It is a single-aisle church with late Gothic features and frescoes on the interior dating to 1430. The altar dates to 1638 and the remaining church furnishings are from the 19th century. In the area around the church evidence of a burial ground from late Antiquity and the period of early Slavic settlement has also been discovered and the area has been officially protected as an archaeological monument.

== Cultural heritage ==
Along the old road to Jesenice there is also a monument to 30 prisoners from the prison in Begunje executed by German soldiers on 1 June 1942 in retaliation for the destruction of the railroad bridge four days earlier. In January 2008 the bronze centerpiece of this monument, a statue by the sculptor Jaka Torkar, was stolen and found cut up into pieces a few days later. A replica statue was installed in 2009.

== Mass graves ==
Moste is the site of two known mass graves associated with the Second World War. The Baud Fallow 1 and 2 mass graves (Slovene: Grobišče Baudova ledina 1, 2) are located north of the settlement and contain the remains of six to 12 Croatian soldiers. The first grave lies in a former gravel pit in a clearing, surrounded by bushes. The grave site has been leveled off. The second grave lies in the woods north of the first, on a small plateau, next to a fence at the bottom of the slope of Mount Ajdna.
