= Breg, Žirovnica =

Breg
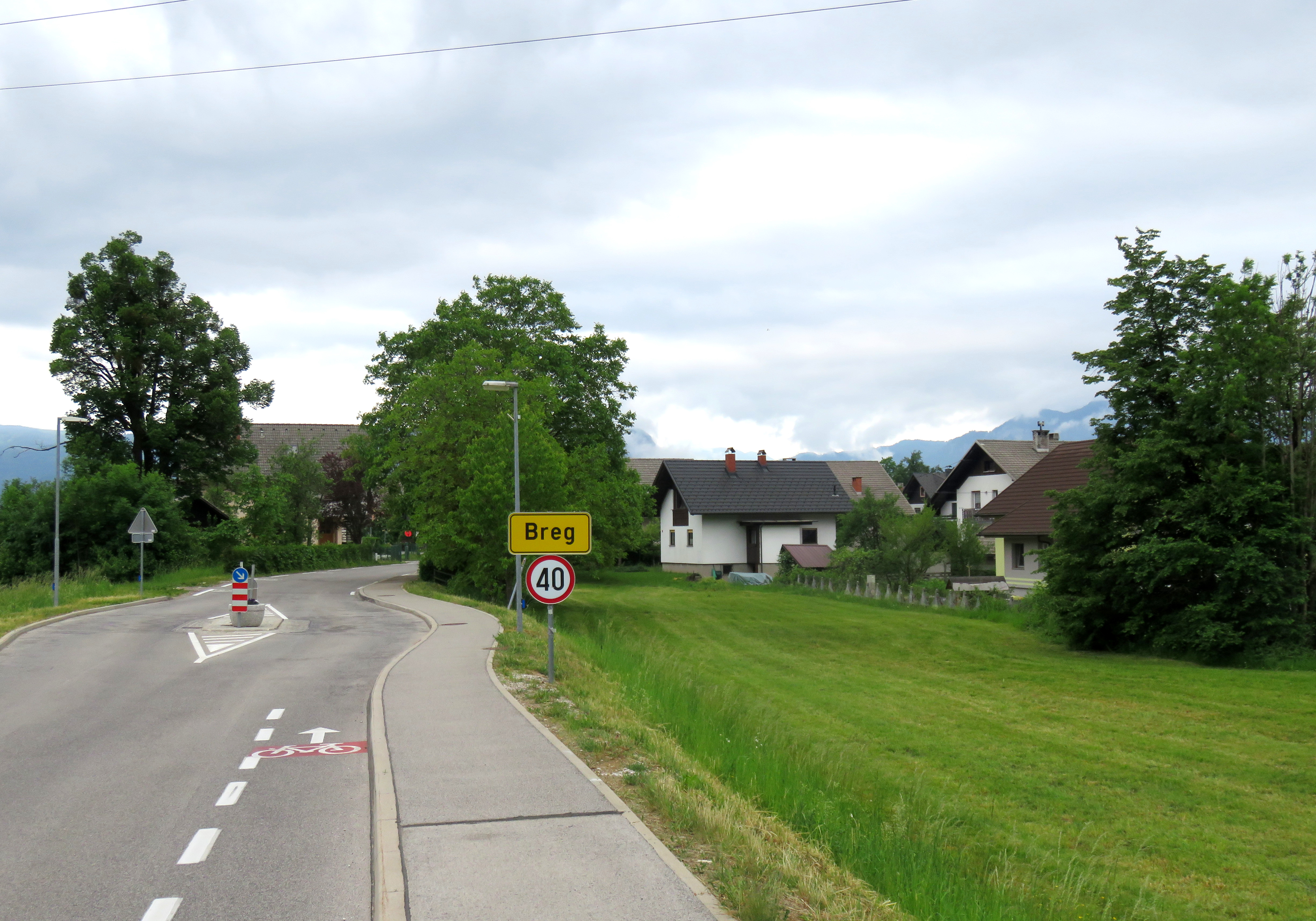

- Location in Slovenia
- Coordinates: 46°23′40″N 14°7′30″E
- Country: Slovenia
- Traditional region: Upper Carniola
- Statistical region: Upper Carniola
- Municipality: Žirovnica
- Elevation: 537 m (1,762 ft)

Population (2002)
  - Total: 598

Breg (pronounced [ˈbɾeːk]; German: Rann) is one of ten villages in the Municipality of Žirovnica in the Upper Carniola region of Slovenia.

== Geography ==
The older part of the settlement lies close to the banks of the Sava River. The newer part of the village lies further north, toward the main road. There are open fields towards the east of the village, and it borders on a forest along the banks of the Sava towards the west.

== Name ==
Breg was attested in written sources as Reine in 1348, Rain in 1359, and Rayn in 1444.

== History ==
A 1994 archaeological excavation around the church in the village revealed graves from the later period of Slavic settlement in the area (9th to 19th century).

== Church ==
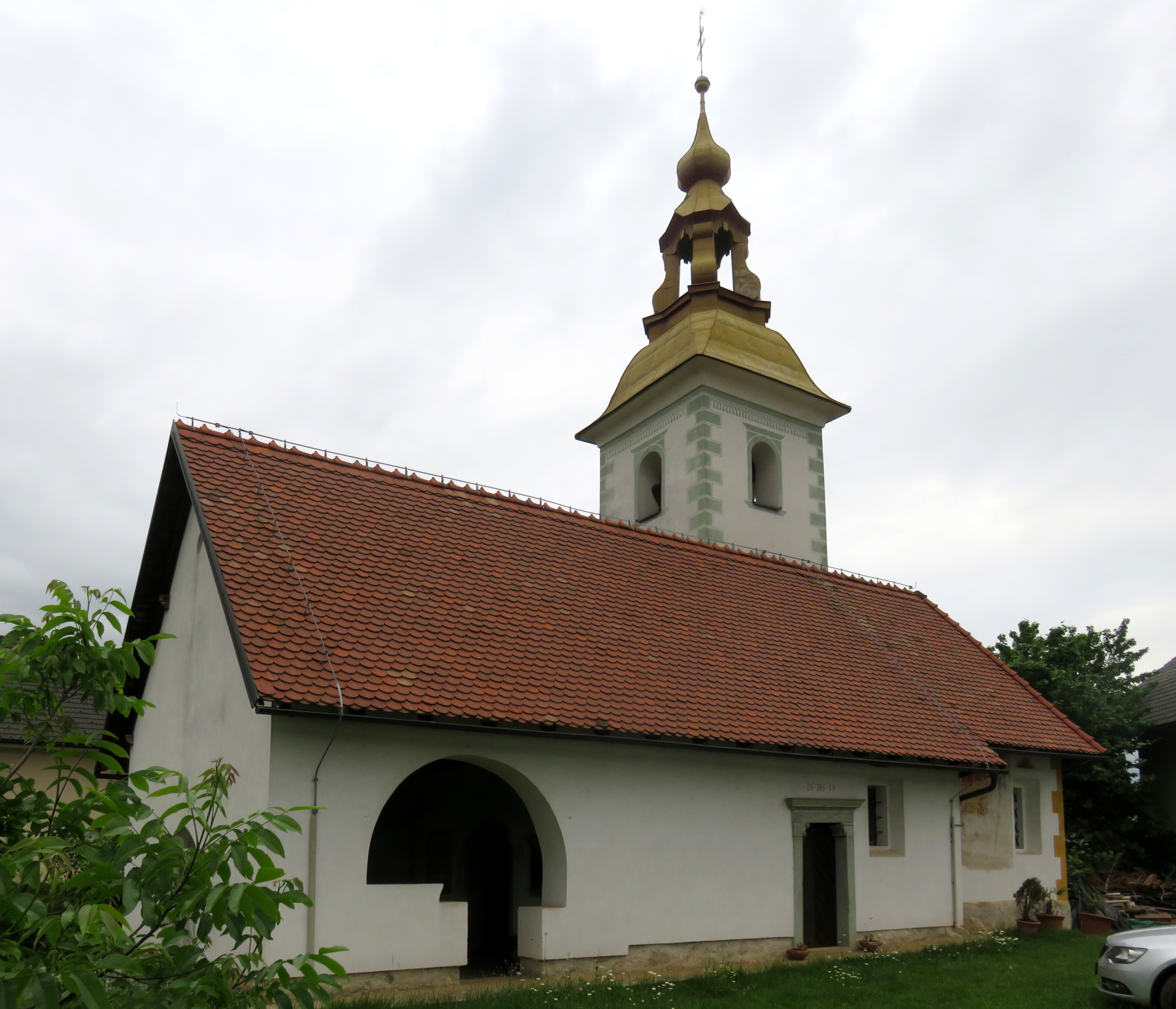
Saint Radegund's Church

St. Radegund's Church, a Gothic structure, was first mentioned in 1468 as a church belonging to the Diocese of Radovljica, but is an older building with Romanesque foundations, partly reflected in the shape of nave and its flat ceiling. Most of the remaining structure is from the mid-17th century. There are two entrances to the church, one from the 14th century and a dated Renaissance portal from 1629. The bell tower with its typical onion-shaped roof is Baroque. There are frescoes of St. Radegund and St. Lawrence on the southern wall. St. Michael fighting a dragon is depicted on the northern wall and there is a baroque painting of St. Christopher on the southern exterior. There is evidence of a wall encircling the church, probably built in the 15th century to protect local inhabitants against Turkish raids in the area. This was demolished in the 17th century, when the church was being rebuilt.
