= Breznica, Žirovnica =

Breznica
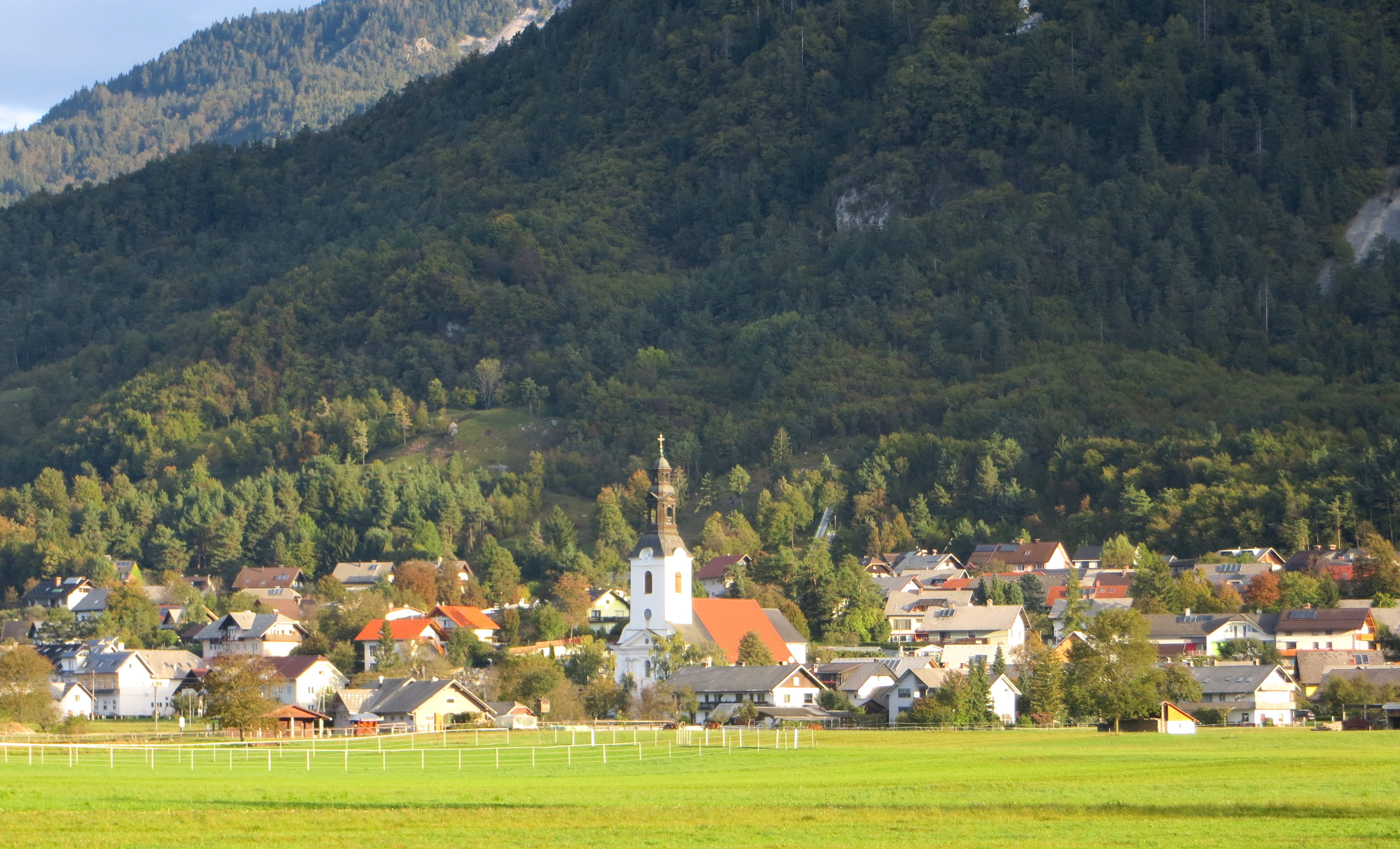

- Location in Slovenia
- Coordinates: 46°23′50″N 14°9′13″E
- Country: Slovenia
- Region: Upper Carniola
- Municipality: Žirovnica
- Elevation: 545 m (1,788 ft)

Population (2002)
  - Total: 459

Breznica (pronounced [ˈbɾéːznitsa]; German: Bresnitz) is one of ten villages in the Municipality of Žirovnica in the Upper Carniola region of Slovenia. It is the seat of the municipality. Most of the village has developed on the slopes of the Reber range, leaving open fields towards the south and east. To the west the built-up area has extended to Zabreznica.

== Name ==
Breznica was attested in written sources as Fressnicz in 1421, Fresiach in 1464, Nabresnitze between 1493 and 1501, and Presnitz in 1498, among other spellings. The name is derived from the common noun breza 'birch'. Like similar toponyms in Slovenia (e.g., Brezova, Brezovec, Brezovci), it originally referred to the local vegetation.

== Church ==
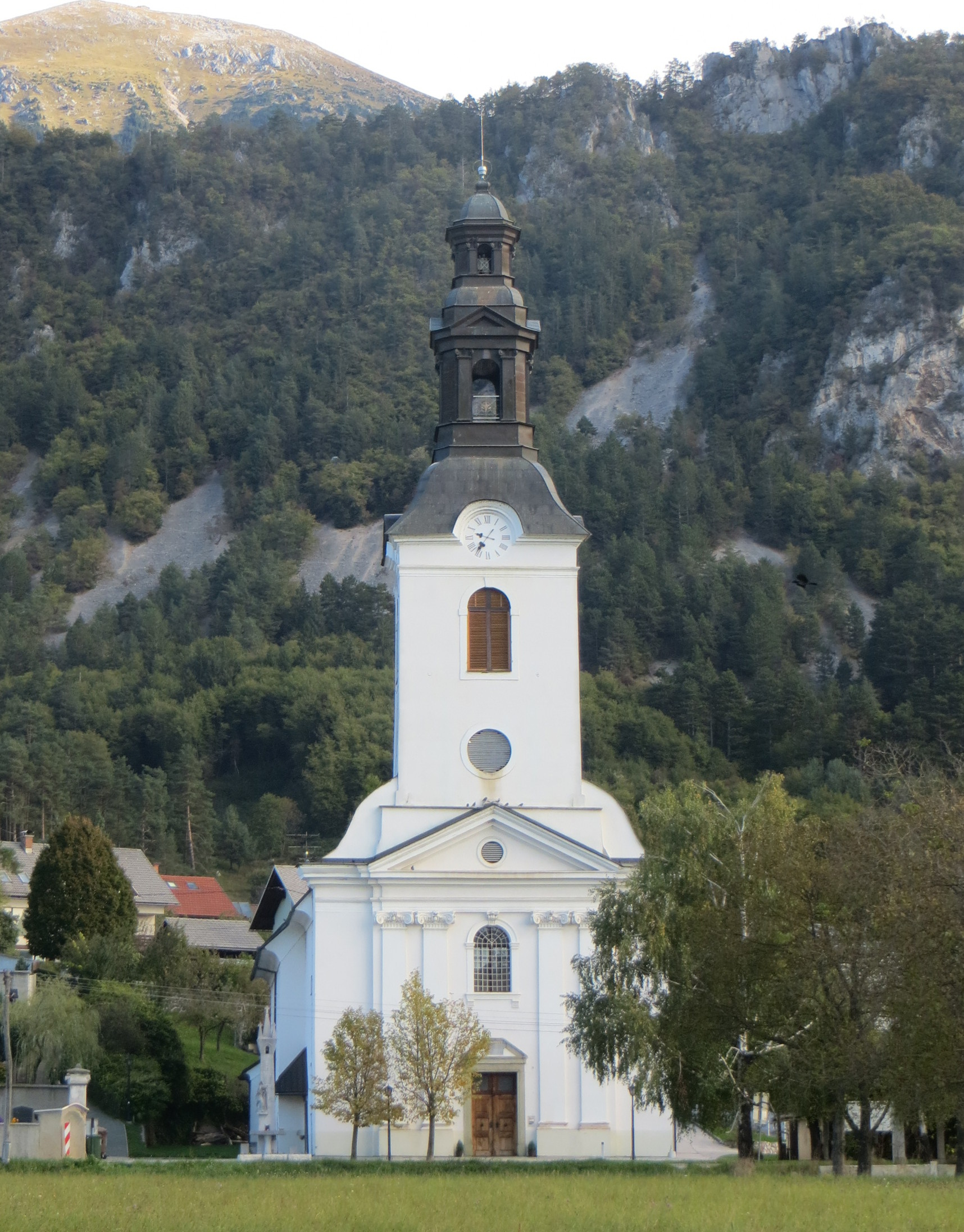
Our Lady of Sorrows Church

The parish church in Breznica is dedicated to Our Lady of Sorrows. Construction of the current parish church began in 1819, and its architect was Blasio Zamolo from Gemona, whose signature can be found above the main entrance. The church was extensively renovated in 1993. In front of the church stands a monument to those who fell in World War I, designed by the architect Jože Plečnik.

== Notable people ==
Notable people that were born or lived in Breznica include:

- Anton Janša (1734–1773), beekeeper
- Andrej Osterman (born 1960), the 25th Commander-in-General of the Slovenian Army, lives in the town
