= Portrait of Eugene of Savoy =

Painting by Jacob van Schuppen

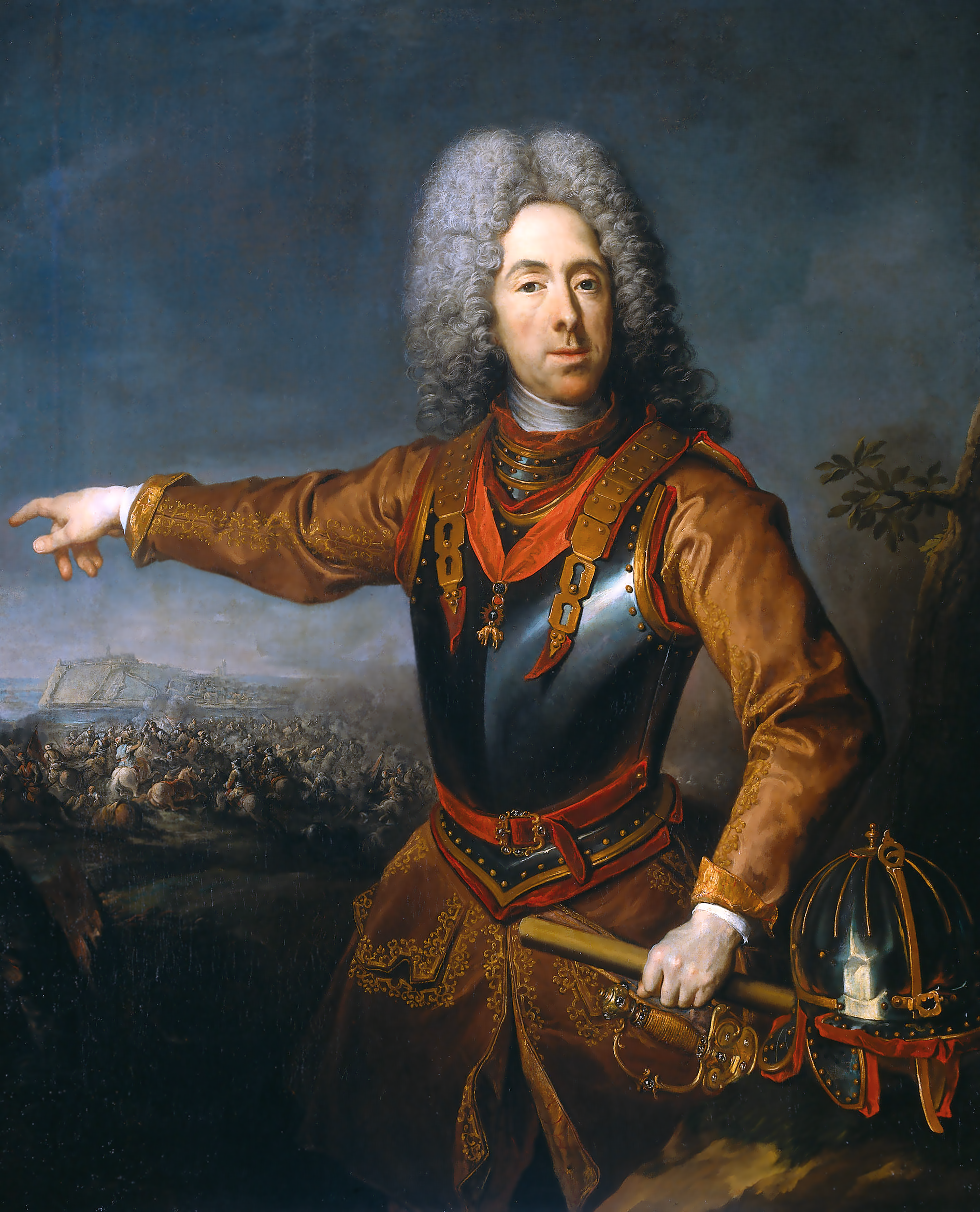
- Artist: Jacob van Schuppen
- Year: 1718
- Type: Oil on canvas, portrait painting
- Dimensions: 146 cm × 119 cm (57 in × 47 in)
- Location: Belvedere, Vienna

Portrait of Eugene of Savoy is a 1718 portrait painting by the French-Austrian artist Jacob van Schuppen. It depicts the celebrated Austrian soldier Prince Eugene of Savoy. Born in Paris of Italian heritage, he became a distinguished soldier in the service of the Habsburg Empire. During the War of the Spanish Succession he had worked triumphantly alongside the British commander John Churchill, 1st Duke of Marlborough in a number of battles and campaigns, checking the power of Louis XIV of France. He then commanded Austrian troops in the Austro-Turkish War, winning further significant victories.

The picture depicts him at the 1717 Siege of Belgrade in 1717. The painting is located in the Belvedere in Vienna, the former summer residence of Eugene, having been on a long-term loan from the Rijksmuseum in Amsterdam since 2003.

== Bibliography ==
- Trnek, Renate. The Picture Gallery of the Academy of Fine Arts in Vienna. Böhlau, 2002.
