= Joseph Mössmer =

Austrian artist (1780–1845)

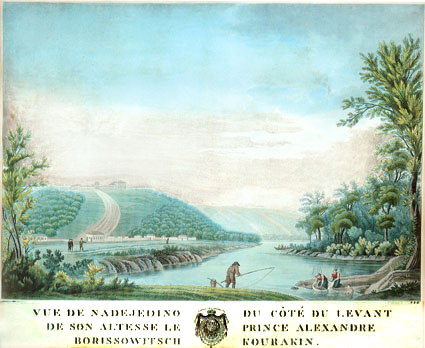
View of the Chateau of Prince Alexander Kurakin de Nadejdino, c. 1800

Joseph Mössmer (20 May 1780 – 22 June 1845) was an Austrian painter and instructor at the Academy of Fine Arts Vienna.

Born in Vienna, he began his artistic training in 1796 under Friedrich August Brand. Later, as an instructor at the Academy, Mössmer headed the landscape painting class for decades, encouraged outdoor painting, and exerted considerable influence without gaining much of a reputation for his own skill.

Mössmer is known for his landscape paintings in a Neoclassical style. At the Academy his notable students included Emanuel Stöckler, August Heinrich, Anton Altmann, and Friedrich Loos.
