= Friedrich Loos =

Austrian artist (1797–1890)

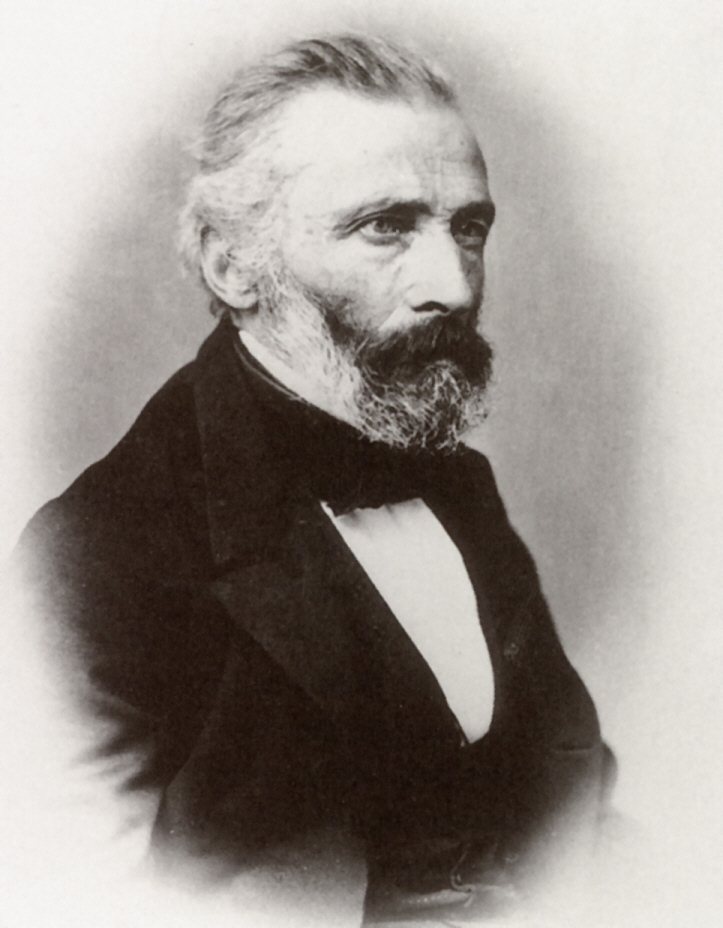
Loos in 1864

Friedrich Loos (29 October 1797 – 9 May 1890) was an Austrian Biedermeier style painter, etcher and lithographer.

He was born in Graz on 29 October 1797. He studied at the Vienna Academy with Joseph Mössmer and also went on study tours through the Austrian Alpine regions. From 1835 to 1836, he lived in Vienna, and as of 1846 he sojourned in Rome. He then moved to Kiel, where he worked as a drawing teacher at the university as of 1863 and where he also died on 9 May 1890. In his pictures, he emphasized light and color in order to loosen up his painting, as well as to harmonize and unite the details.

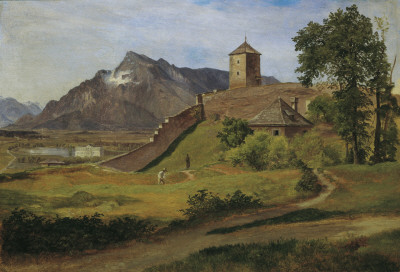
Friedrich Loos, The Falcon Tower on Monk Mountain, Österreichische Galerie Belvedere, 1835
