= Christian Hilfgott Brand =

German painter

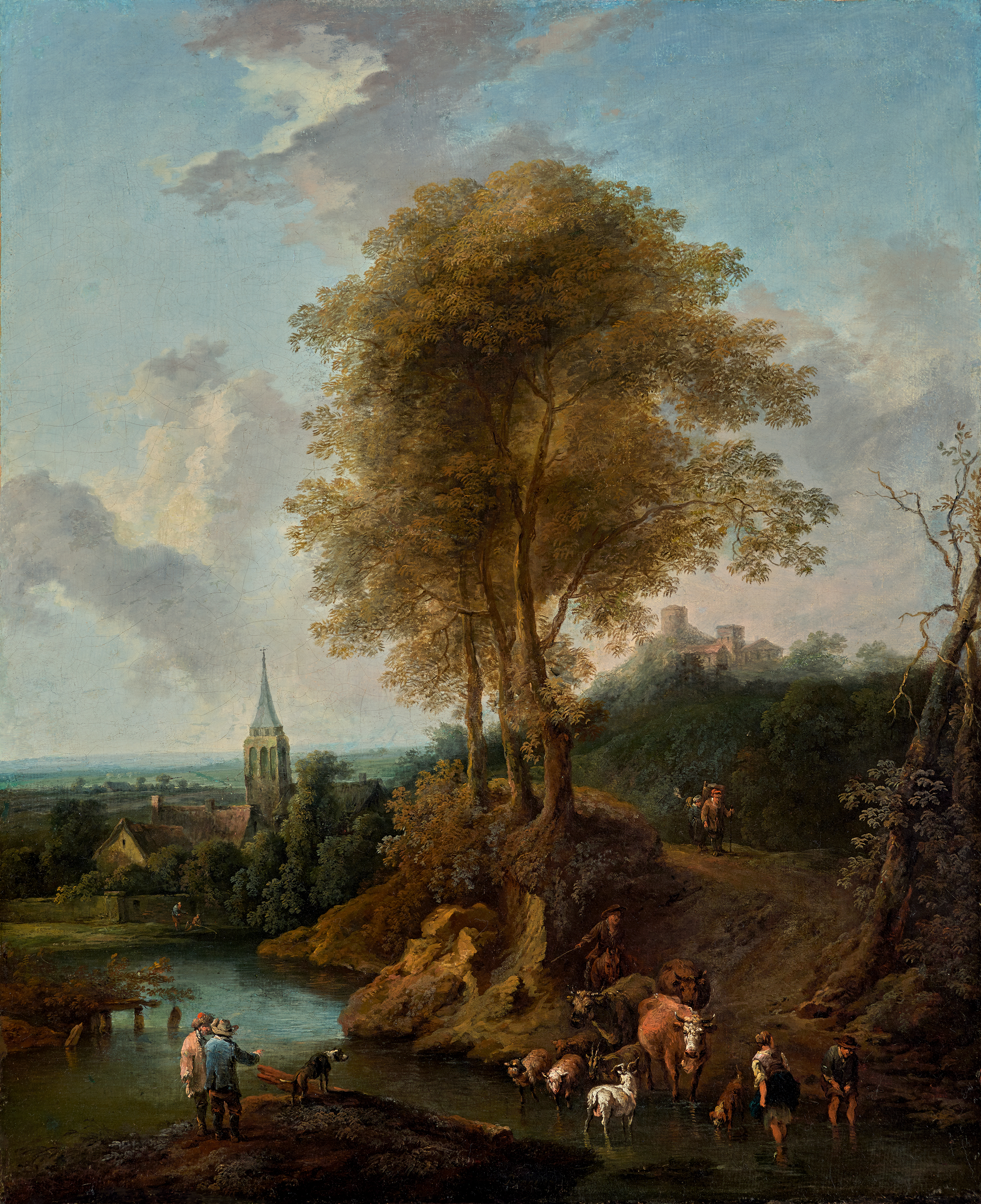
Landscape with Three Trees and a Church

Christian Hilfgott Brand (16 March 1695 – 22 July 1756) was a German-Austrian landscape painter. His year of birth is also given as 1693 or 1694, and there are numerous variations of his middle name.

== Biography ==
He was born in Frankfurt an der Oder. While he was still a boy, his father moved the family business to Hamburg, and it was there that he completed his education. He then moved to Regensburg, to live with his mother's relatives, where he sought employment in a commercial office. While doing so, he met the artist, Christoph Ludwig Agricola, and developed an interest in painting. Agricola's paintings were mostly landscapes, so he influenced Brand in that direction, as well as passing on his own influences from Claude Lorrain and Nicolas Poussin.

Brand settled in Vienna, in 1720, believing that it would be a better place to establish himself. Two years later, his first wife Rosina died, after giving birth. In 1725, he married Maria Magdalena Thorwild (died 1789). During this time, he also began to associate with groups of local artists, seeking to make connections. Largely self-taught up to that point, he attended the Academy of Fine Arts from 1726 to 1728, to sharpen his skills.

In 1738, the Imperial Court cited him as a specialist in the Dutch style of painting. Two years later, he was awarded a commission for some unusually large works. To help complete them, he enlisted the aid of his friend, August Querfurt who, as a painter of hunting and battle scenes, specialized in horses and large groups of people. Despite the assistance, he became exhausted and suffered a stroke that left him paralyzed on the right side. He switched to painting with his left hand, and produced a "Magnificat" (a scene from the life of the Virgin Mary). It was indistinguishable from his previous works.

He was named one of the first honorary members of the Vienna Academy in 1751. Three years later, he was appointed an Advisor. He had many admirers among the diplomatic community in Vienna, including the Danish envoy, Christian August von Berckentin, and the Sardinian envoy, Luigi di Canale. He was also a favorite of the art historian, Christian Ludwig von Hagedorn.

Two of his sons became artists: Friedrich August Brand, from his second marriage, and Johann Christian Brand, from his first. Heinrich Carl Brandt, a portrait painter who was born in 1724, between his marriages, is generally believed to be his son as well. Brand died in 1756 in Vienna.

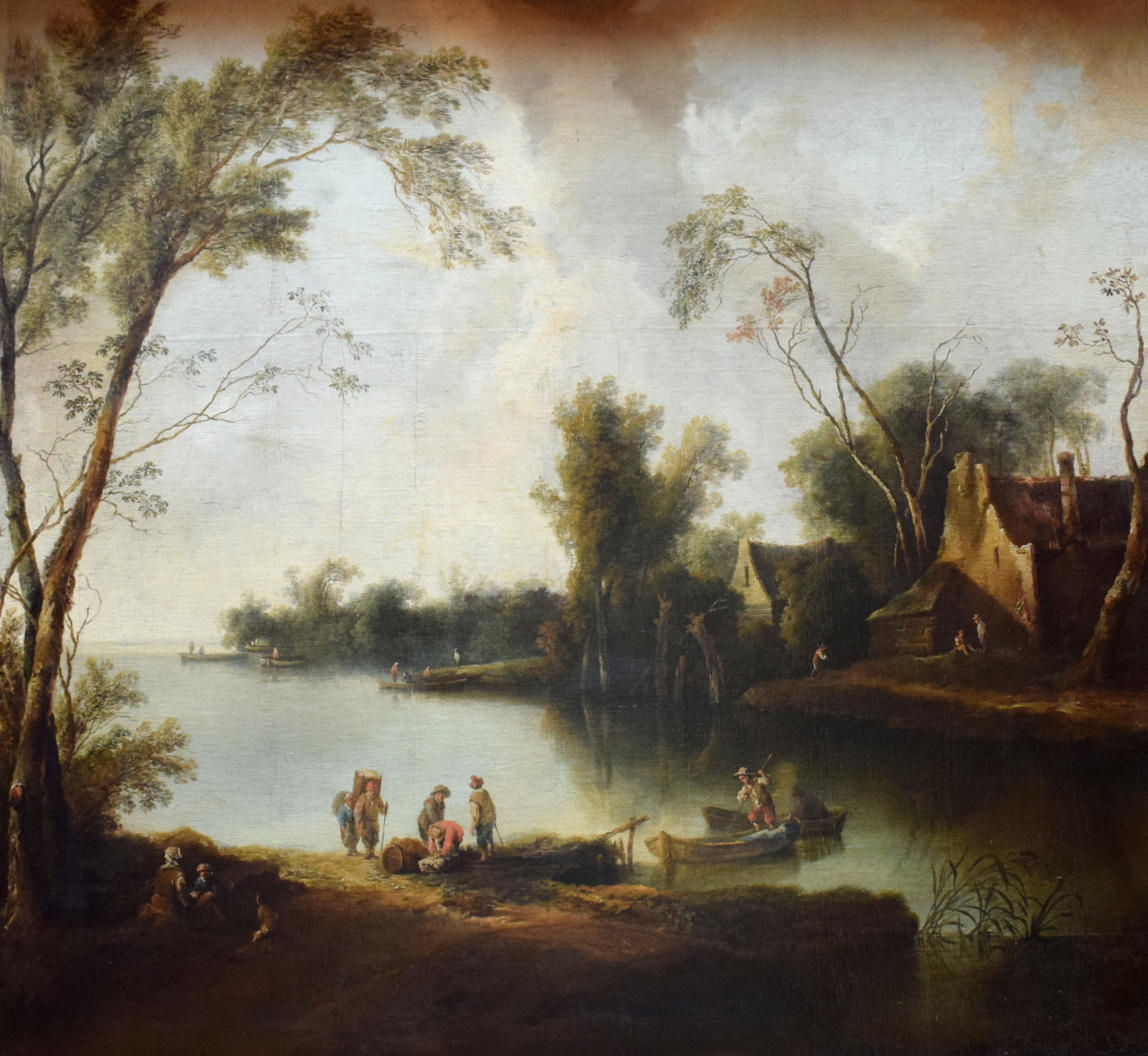
Riverside Landscape
