= Žirovnica, Žirovnica =

Žirovnica
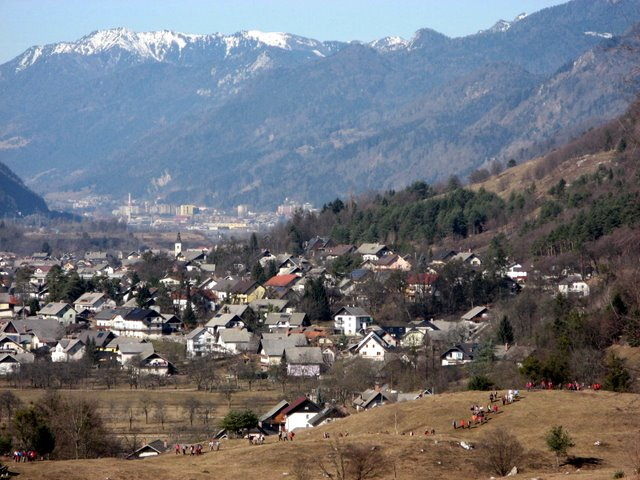

- Location of the town of Žirovnica in Slovenia
- Coordinates: 46°24′N 14°08′E
- Country: Slovenia
- Traditional region: Upper Carniola
- Statistical region: Upper Carniola
- Municipality: Žirovnica

Population (2002)
  - Total: 550
- Time zone: UTC+01 (CET)
  - Summer (DST): UTC+02 (CEST)
- Postal code: 4274 Žirovnica

Žirovnica (pronounced [ʒiˈɾoːu̯nitsa]; German: Scheraunitz) is a settlement in northwestern Slovenia, in the Municipality of Žirovnica. It is located in the historic Upper Carniola region, on the southern slope of the Karawanks mountain range, close to the border with Austria.

== Name ==
Žirovnica was first attested in written sources in 1253 as Zarnonize (and as Zaronitz in 1306–1309, Sernavnicz in 1344). The name developed from *Žьrnovьnica, derived from žьrny 'quern', a metaphorical reference to the shape of the valley where it is located. In the past the German name was Scheraunitz.

== History ==
During the Second World War, a battle took place between German units and the Partisan Cankar Brigade on 20 February 1942 on nearby Mount Stol, during which the Prešeren Lodge (Slovene: Prešernova koča) was also burned (it was not rebuilt until 1965). The Partisans burned the wooden railway station in the town on 13 September 1942. After the Second World War, a Yugoslav labor camp for political prisoners operated in Žirovnica.

== Notable people ==
Notable people that were born or lived in Žirovnica include:

- Janez Čop (1810–1846), writer
- Matija Čop (1797–1835), linguist
- Urban Gollmayr (1820–1905), priest
- Tomo Kajdiš (1834–1914), politician
