= Smokuč =

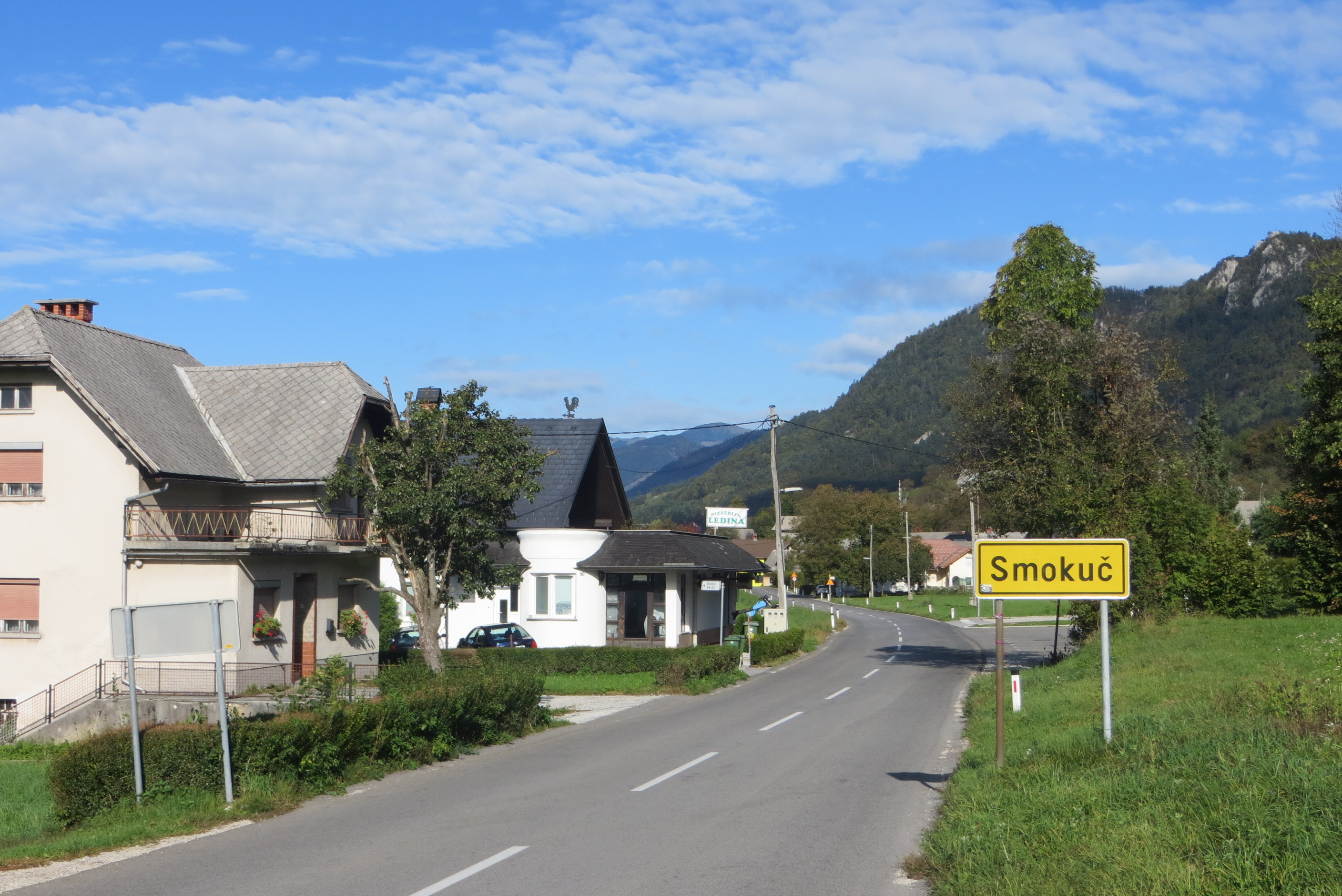

- Location in Slovenia
- Coordinates: 46°23′2.78″N 14°9′46.34″E
- Country: Slovenia
- Traditional region: Upper Carniola
- Statistical region: Upper Carniola
- Municipality: Žirovnica

Area
- 1.54 km^{2} (0.59 sq mi)
- Elevation: 531 m (1,742 ft)

Population (2018)
  - Total: 524

Smokuč (pronounced [ˈsmɔːkutʃ]) is one of ten villages in the Municipality of Žirovnica in the Upper Carniola region of Slovenia.
