= Anton Janša =

Slovene beekeeper

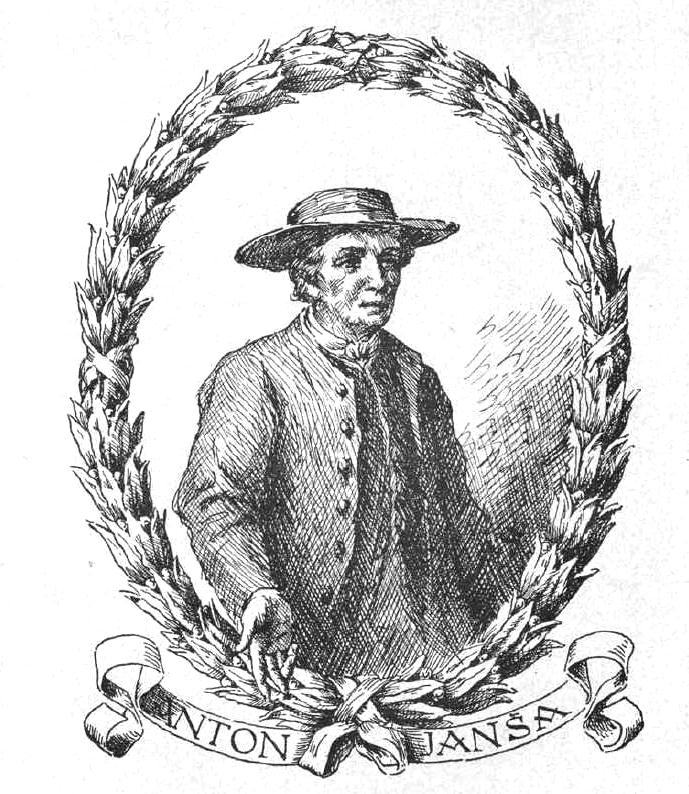
- Born: c. 20 May 1734; Breznica, Carniola (now in Slovenia)
- Died: 13 September 1773 (aged 39); Vienna, Holy Roman Empire (now in Austria)
- Occupations: apiarist painter
- Known for: Pioneer of modern apiculture
- Notable work: Discussion on Beekeeping (1771); A Full guide to Beekeeping

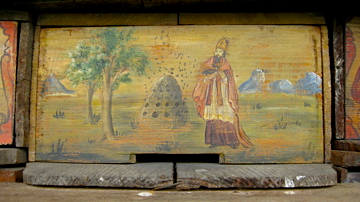
Beehive painting, Janša Beehive

Anton Janša (c. 20 May 1734 – 13 September 1773) was a Carniolan apiarist and painter. Janša is known as a pioneer of modern apiculture and a great expert in the field. He was educated as a painter, but was employed as a teacher of apiculture at the Habsburg court in Vienna.

== Biography ==
Anton Janša was born in a family of nine children from Slovene parents in Breznica, Carniola (now in Slovenia). His exact birth date is not known, however, he was baptised on 20 May 1734. (Note: In his book Anton Janša, prvi učitelj čebelarstva: Druga dopolnjena izdaja, Andrej Šalehar wrote: "Anton Janša birthday is unknown. The date of baptism is recorded in the baptismal registers of Zupnia Radovijica: 20 May 1734 — this is now taken as his birthday.") At a young age Janša, together with his brothers Tine and Lovro, showed a great interest in painting (they had a studio in their barn). All three brothers, despite being illiterate, went to Vienna and entered the painters' academy there. Ceferin wrote "Anton rose to the challenge, and even distinguished himself, winning the prestigious state scholarship for a study tour of Italy, awarded only to exceptional students." His two brothers actually finished their studies at the academy and became professors there.

Anton, despite a talent for painting, soon discovered that his true interests were in bee-keeping. His interest came early on, since his father had over one hundred hives at home and neighbouring farmers would gather at the village and discuss farming and bee-keeping. In 1769 he began to work full-time as a bee-keeper and a year later became the first royally appointed teacher of apiculture for all Austrian lands. He kept bees in the imperial gardens (Augarten) and travelled around Austria presenting his observations in regard to moving hives to various pastures. He died in Vienna.

== Importance ==
He became famous for his lectures in which he demonstrated his knowledge of bees. He also wrote two books in German: Abhandlung vom Schwärmen der Bienen (Discussion on Beekeeping, 1771) and Vollständige Lehre von der Bienenzucht (A Full Guide to Beekeeping). The latter was published in 1775, after his death. In his 1775 work he noted: "Bees are a type of fly, hardworking, created by God to provide man with all needed honey and wax. Among all God's beings there are none so hard working and useful to man with so little attention needed for its keep as the bee." The Empress Maria Theresa issued a decree after Janša's death obliging all teachers of apiculture to use his books.

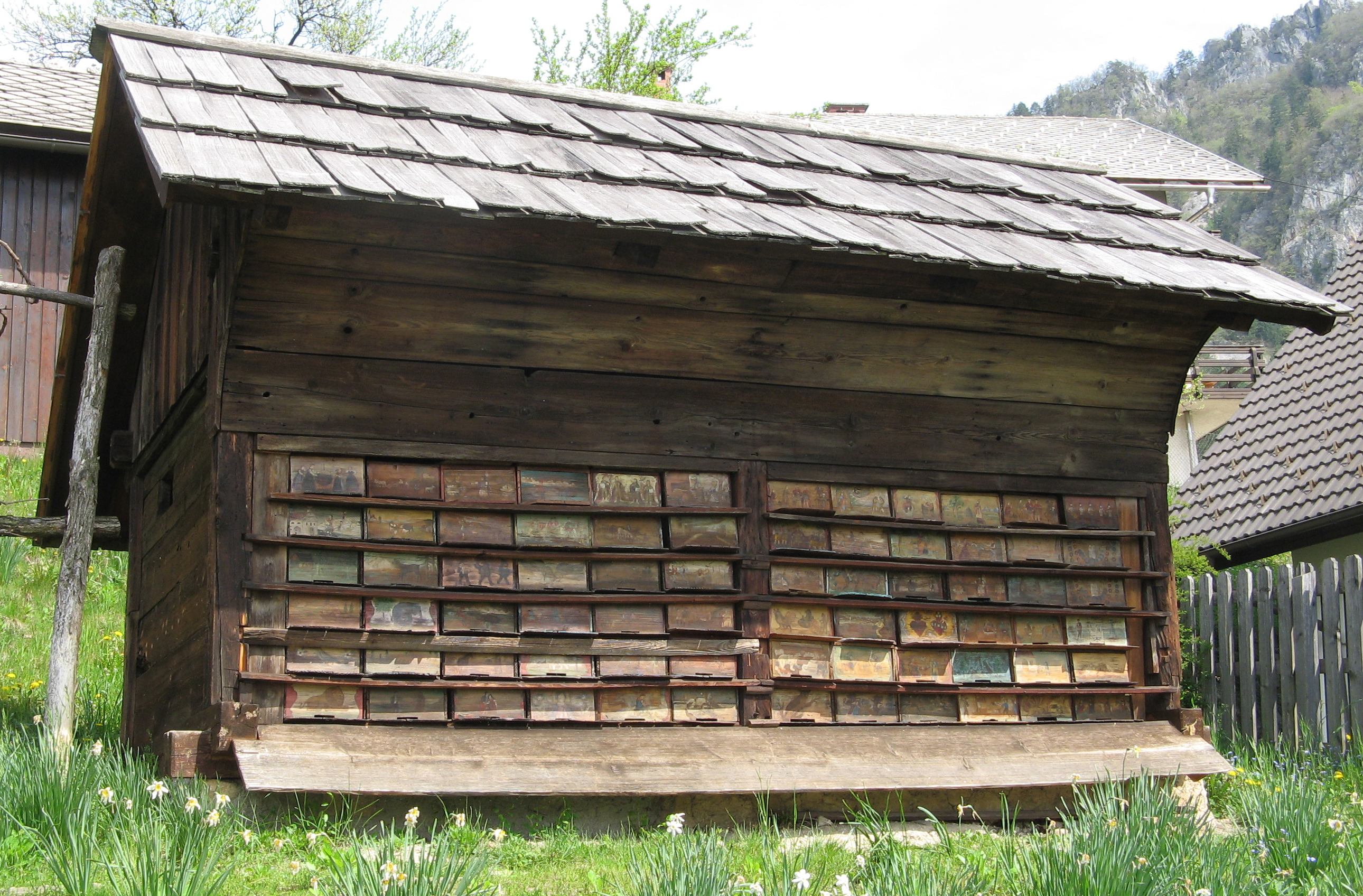
Janša Beehive in Breznica

In beekeeping he is noted for changing the size and shape of hives to a form where they can be stacked together like blocks. As a painter he also decorated the fronts of hives with paintings. Janša rejected the belief that the male bees are water carriers and assumed that the queen is fertilized mid-air. He advocated moving hives to pastures.

The Janša Beehive was preserved by Slovene beekeepers and in 1884 a plaque was put on the house where he was born. The Museum of Apiculture in Radovljica is also named after him.

== Sources ==
- Ceferin, Aleksandra (2008). "Anton Janša". thezaurus.com. Institute for Slovenian Studies of Victoria..
- Blomstedt, William (2017-10-02). "Peter Pavel Glavar: A History of Humanity and Beekeeping". Bee World. 94 (4): 111–118. doi:10.1080/0005772X.2017.1375258.
- "Beekeeping Pioneer Immortalised By A Un Day". cordmagazine.com. Alliance International Media. 2023. CorDMagazine2023..
- Crane, Eva (1999-10-13). The World History of Beekeeping and Honey Hunting. Routledge. doi:10.4324/9780203819937. ISBN 978-1-136-74670-3..
- Glogovčan Belančić, Tanja (2023). "150 years of organised beekeeping". slovenia.si..
- "Pioneers of Slovenian Beekeeping". gov.si. 2020. GovSi2020..
- "Janša, Anton (1734–1773)". slovenska-biografija.si (in Slovenian). slovenska-biografija..
- Šalehar, Andrej (2019). Anton Janša, prvi učitelj čebelarstva [Anton Janša, the first teacher of beekeeping] (in Slovenian). Ljubljana: Buča. ISBN 9789616704892.

== See also ==
- World Bee Day
