= Johann Christian Brand =

Austrian painter

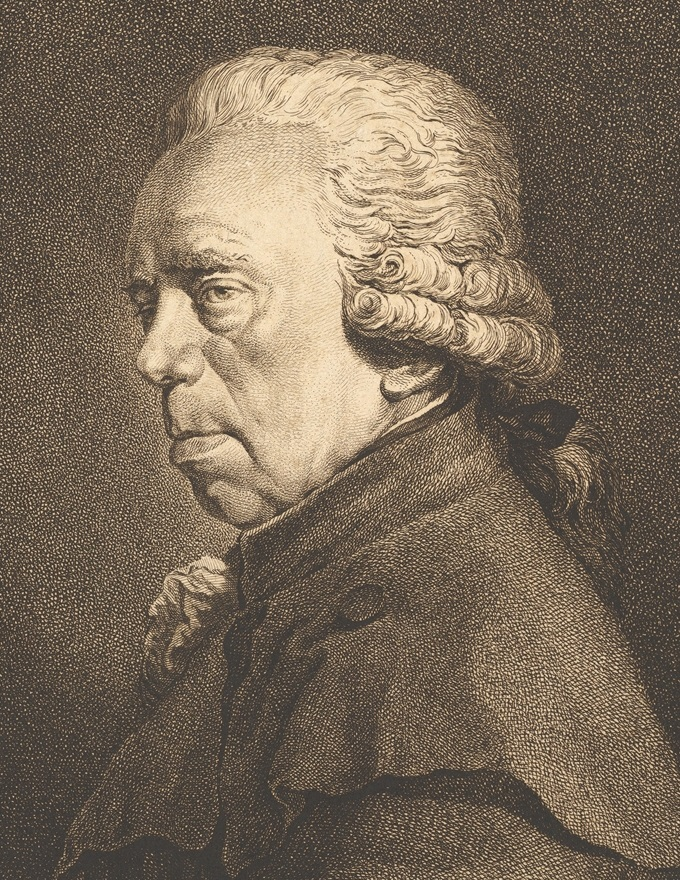
Portrait of Johann Christian Brand by Adam Bartsch (1793), Metropolitan Museum of Art

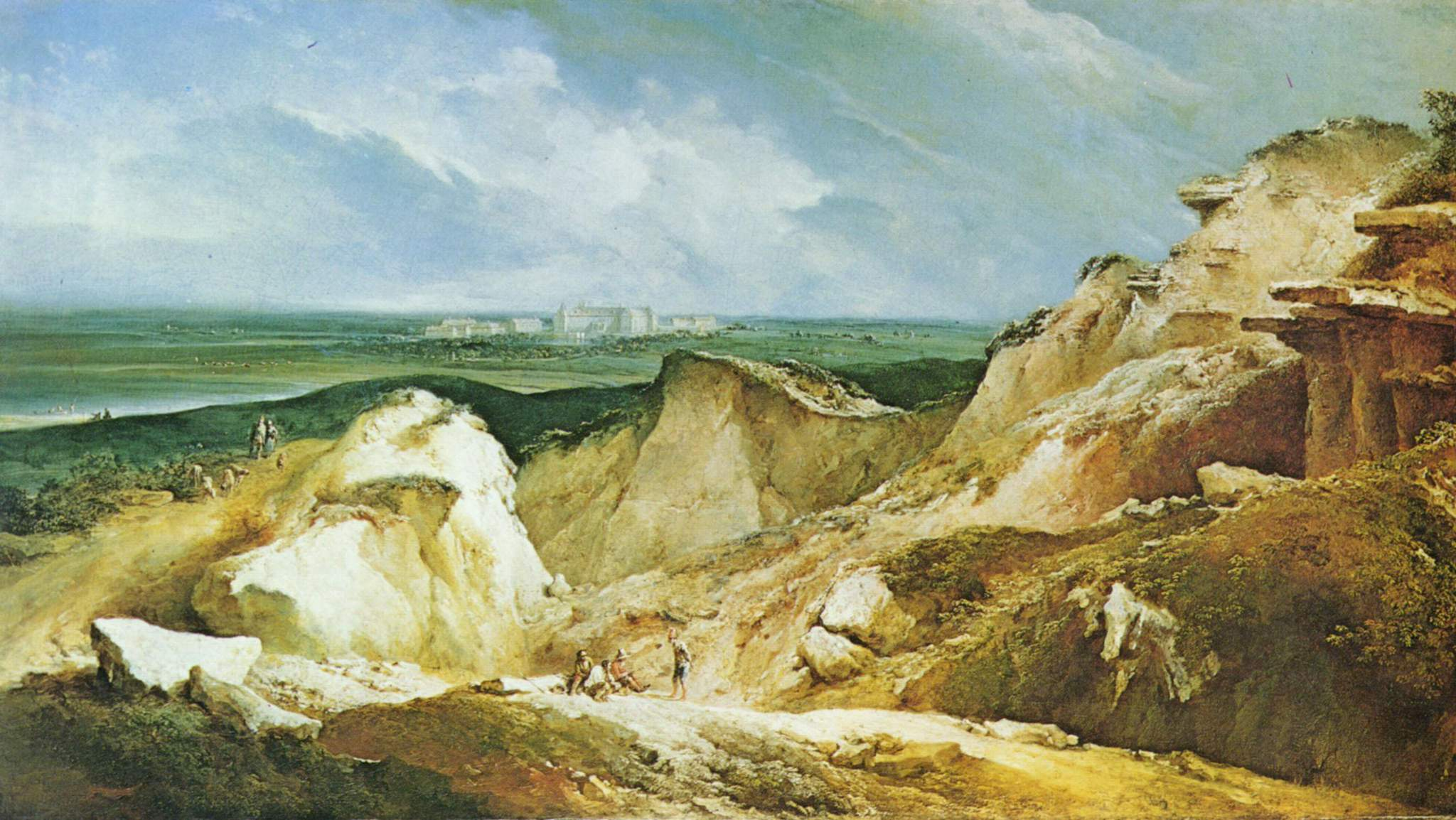
Sandpit, by Johann Christian Brand, 1744.

Johann Christian Brand (6 March 1722 – 12 June 1795) was an Austrian painter (son of the German painter Christian Hilfgott Brand (1694–1756) who taught in Vienna with Karl Aigen) and brother of Friedrich August Brand. Johann Christian Brand influenced ending the baroque era of landscape painting. He died in Vienna.

== Life and work ==
Johann Christian Brand was born in Vienna on 6 March 1722. Influential in ending the baroque era, Johann studied at the Vienna Academy from 1736. He was awarded with the titles Kammermaler in 1766 and "Professor of Landscape Drawing" in 1772. The landscape paintings of Johann Christian Brand marked the transition from the baroque to the 19th-century style of landscape depiction.

Johann Christian Brand died in Vienna on 12 June 1795.

== Galleries ==
Works by Johann Christian Brand are contained in Laxenburg Castle, Österreichische Galerie in Belvedere Palace, Vienna Art History Museum, Museum of Military History, National Gallery Prague, Göttweig, Klosterneuburg, Museum at the Schottenstift, Liechtenstein and Harrach galleries.

== See also ==
- Christian Hilfgott Brand, father of Johann Christian Brand.
