= Friedrich August Brand =

Austrian painter (1735–1806)

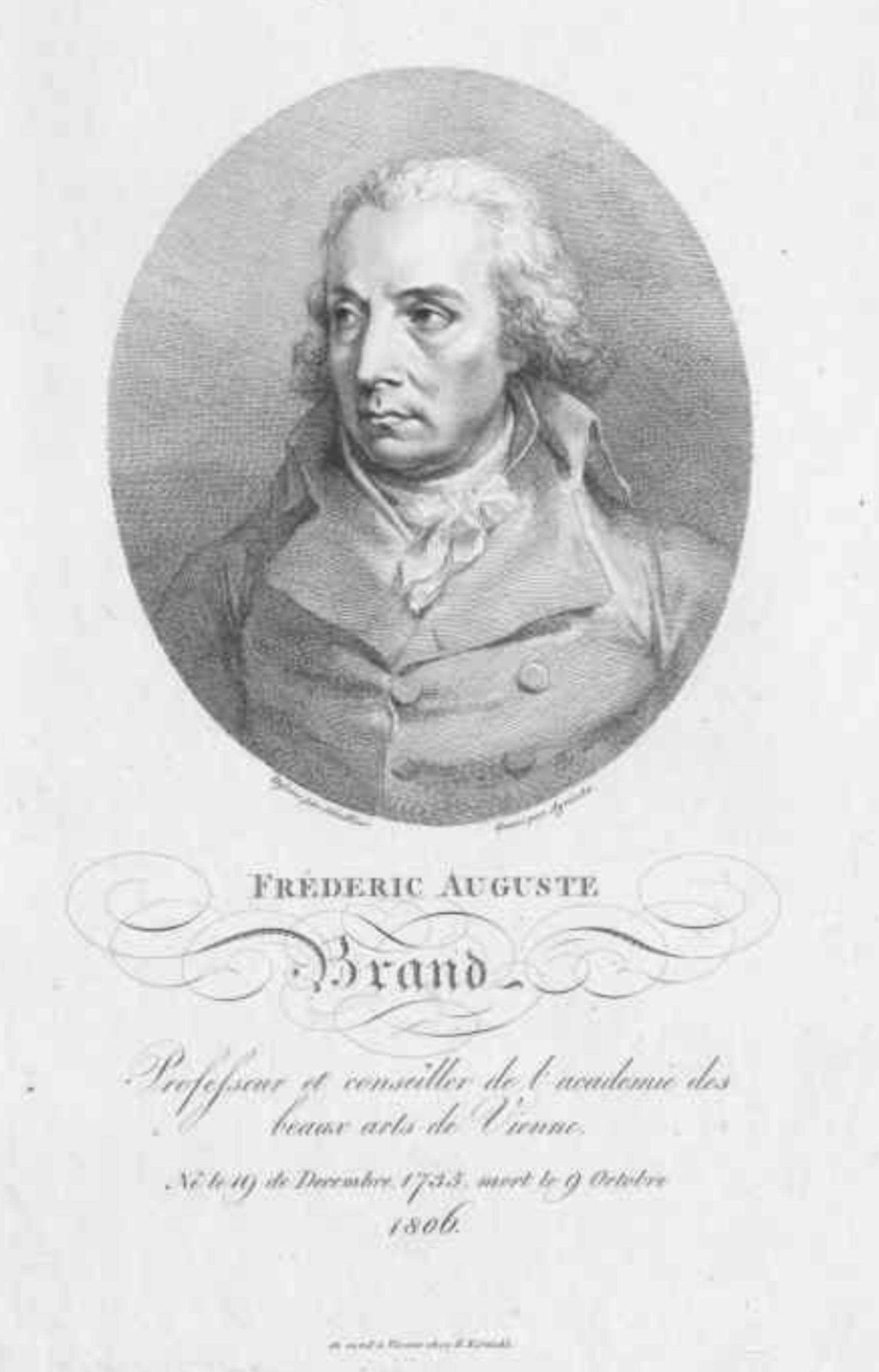
Portrait of Friedrich August Brand by Karl Agricola. The text can be translated as "Professor and Councillor of the Academy of Fine Arts of Vienna. Born 19 December 1735, died 9 October 1806."

Friedrich August Brand (20 December 1735 – 9 October 1806) was an Austrian painter.

The son of Christian Hülfgott Brand, he was born at Vienna. He was a member of the Imperial Academy, and died at Vienna in 1806. He painted several historical subjects and landscapes, which are favourably spoken of by the German authors, and engraved some plates, both with the point and with the graver, in the use of which he was instructed by Schmutzer. His known works include the following:

- The Breakfast; after Torenvliet
- A View near Nuisdorf
- View of the Garden of Schoenbrunn
- Banditti attacking a Carriage
- The Entrance to the Town of Crems

Among his students was the long-standing professor of landscape painting at the Academy of Fine Arts Vienna, Joseph Mössmer.
