= Zabreznica =

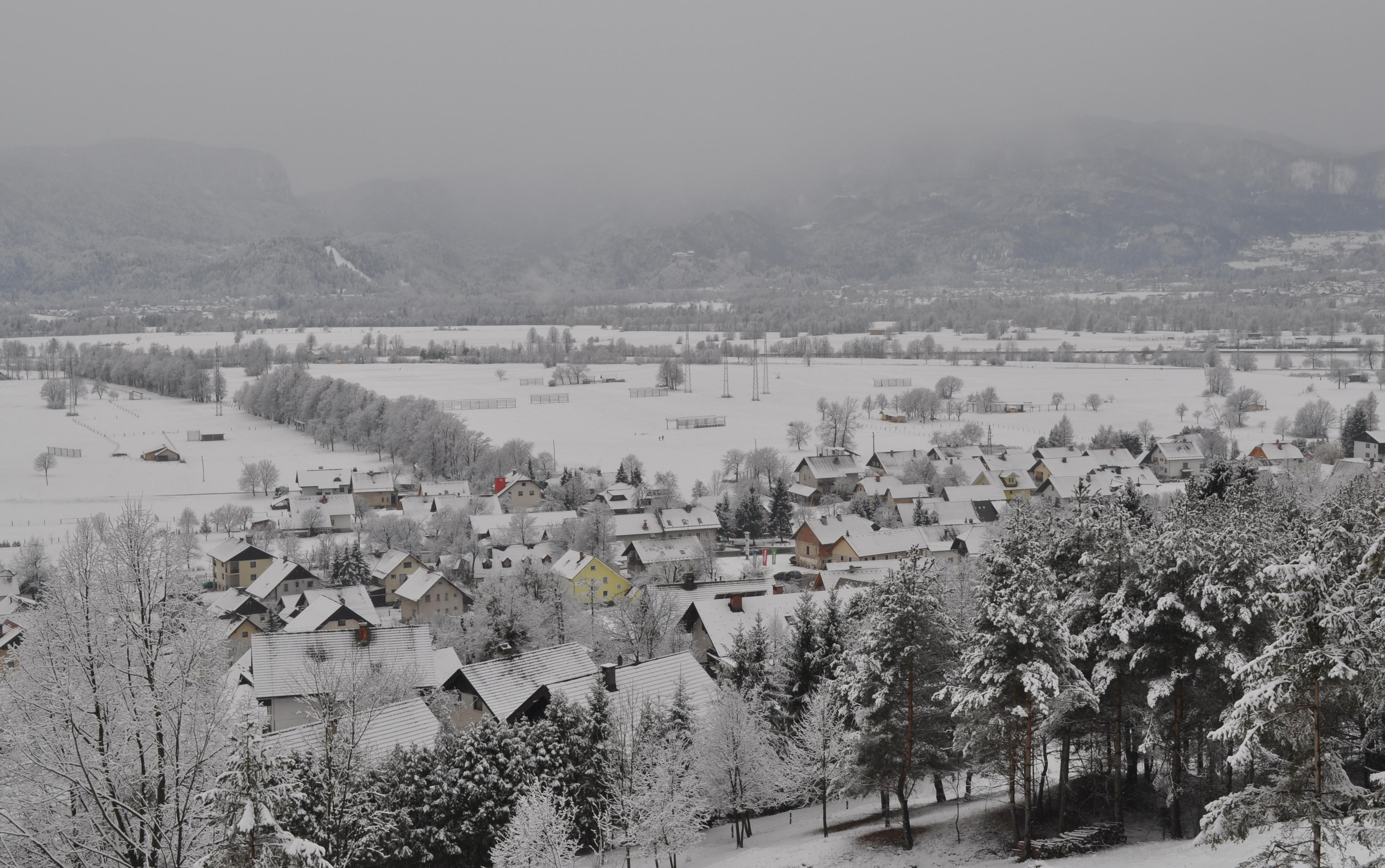

- Location in Slovenia
- Coordinates: 46°23′51″N 14°08′56″E
- Country: Slovenia
- Traditional region: Upper Carniola
- Statistical region: Upper Carniola
- Municipality: Žirovnica

Area
  - Total: 4.28 km^{2} (1.65 sq mi)
- Elevation: 547.2 m (1,795 ft)

Population (2019)
  - Total: 490

Zabreznica (pronounced [zaˈbɾeːznitsa]; German: Sabresnitz) is one of ten villages in the Municipality of Žirovnica in the Upper Carniola region of Slovenia.

It is the location of Žirovnica Primary School, which serves the primary education needs of all the villages in the municipality. Above the village, on the Reber Ridge, a church dedicated to St. Lawrence was rebuilt in the 1990s on the foundations of a Romanesque church that was demolished in 1821. It is decorated with work by the contemporary Slovene artists Janez Bernik and Andrej Jemec.
