= Canaletto Blick =

Painting of Vienna

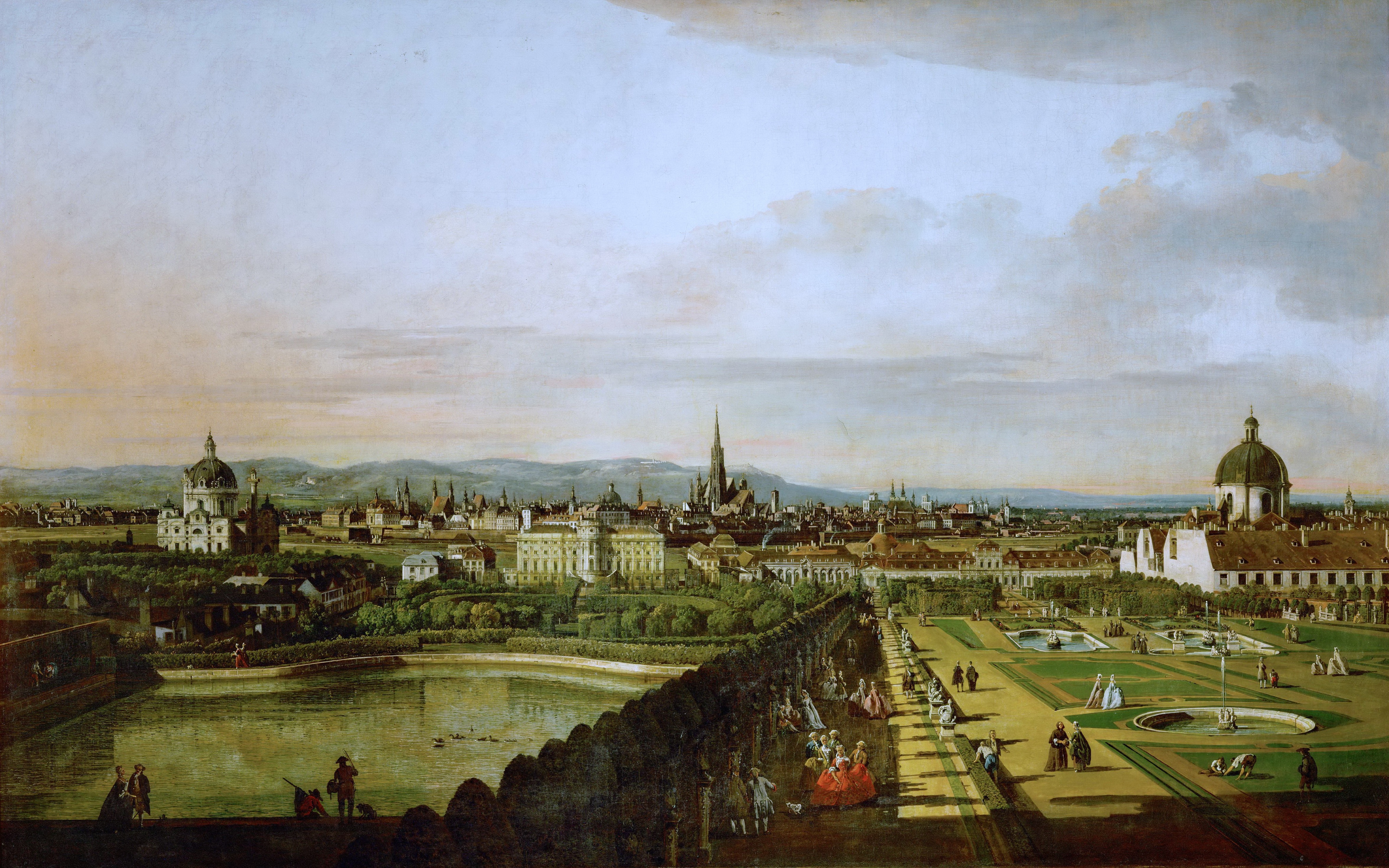
Bernardo Bellotto: View of Vienna from the Belvedere, 1759–1760, Museum of Art History in Vienna

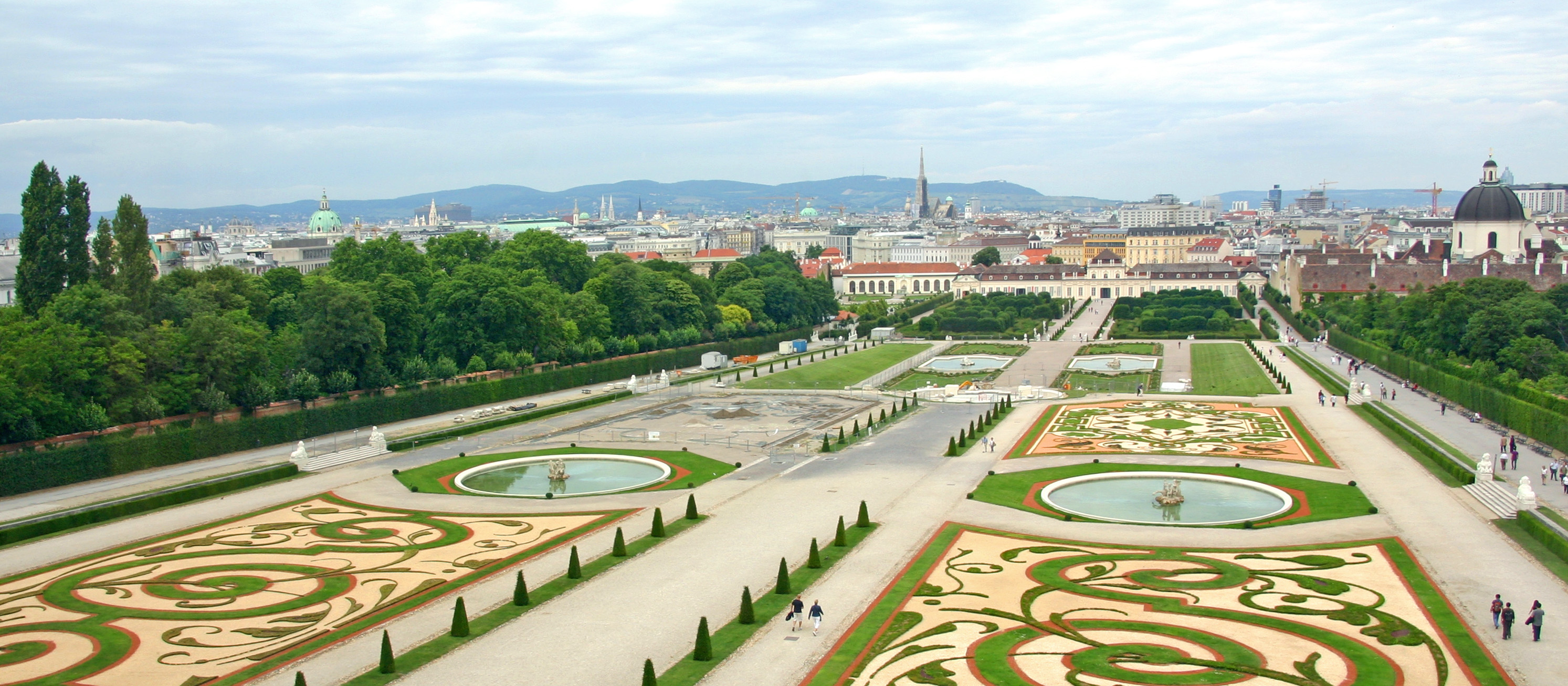
A modern variation of the Vienna Canaletto View as seen from the Upper Belvedere Palace

The Canaletto Blick (lit.: Canaletto View) of Vienna in Austria is a famous perspective of the city center of Vienna, as seen from the Upper Belvedere Palace. It was popularized by a painting from Bernardo Bellotto, who sometimes used the name of his famous uncle, Canaletto.

== The painting ==
The original veduta, which serves as the blueprint for this view, depicts Vienna in either 1759 or 1760 on a hot summer day with high society mingling in the shade of a green wall separating the gardens. The domes of Karlskirche, St. Stephen's Cathedral tower, and the dome of the Salesian Nuns' Church serve as vertical landmarks. The foreground shows the gardens of the Belvedere Palace. Other prominent landmarks visible in Bellotto's oil painting that still exist today are the Schwarzenberg Palace and the Lower Belvedere Palace.

As many Belotto's works, the picture was created using a camera obscura on paper and then transferred to a larger conventional painting, the technique nowadays creates a feeling of authenticity.

== Symbolism ==
This representation served not only as a faithful cityscape but also carried political symbolism. The painting reflects Vienna's development under the Habsburg dynasty. The artist embellished the perspective of his work, likely to please his patron, Maria Theresa. Buildings associated with the patroness were slightly enlarged or repositioned, notably the dome of the Salesian Nuns' Church, whose foundation stone was laid at the birth of Maria Theresa. The tower of the Elisabethinenkirche, shown on the far right of the image, would not have been visible from this vantage point, but Canaletto included it, likely due to financial support from the empress. Two observatories, no longer in existence today, were also depicted to honor the Habsburgs as patrons of the sciences.

== Impact and protection ==
Despite Vienna's growth in the 19th century and the city's transformation from a fortified town, the overall impression of the Canaletto view remained largely intact and served as inspiration for numerous artists.

The Canaletto view has played a significant role in urban planning discussions, particularly in the debate over the construction of high-rises near Vienna's historical center. Plans to construct high-rises near Vienna's historical center have been a topic of discussion but are always tied to the protection of the Canaletto view. In 2017, UNESCO added Vienna to the watchlist after plans for a 75-meter-high-rise development (Heumarkt-Tower) within the confines of the cultural heritage site were approved. The World Heritage Committee ruled that the plans for the Heumarkt area threatened the characteristics that saw the city placed on the World Heritage List in 2001.

== Similar views ==
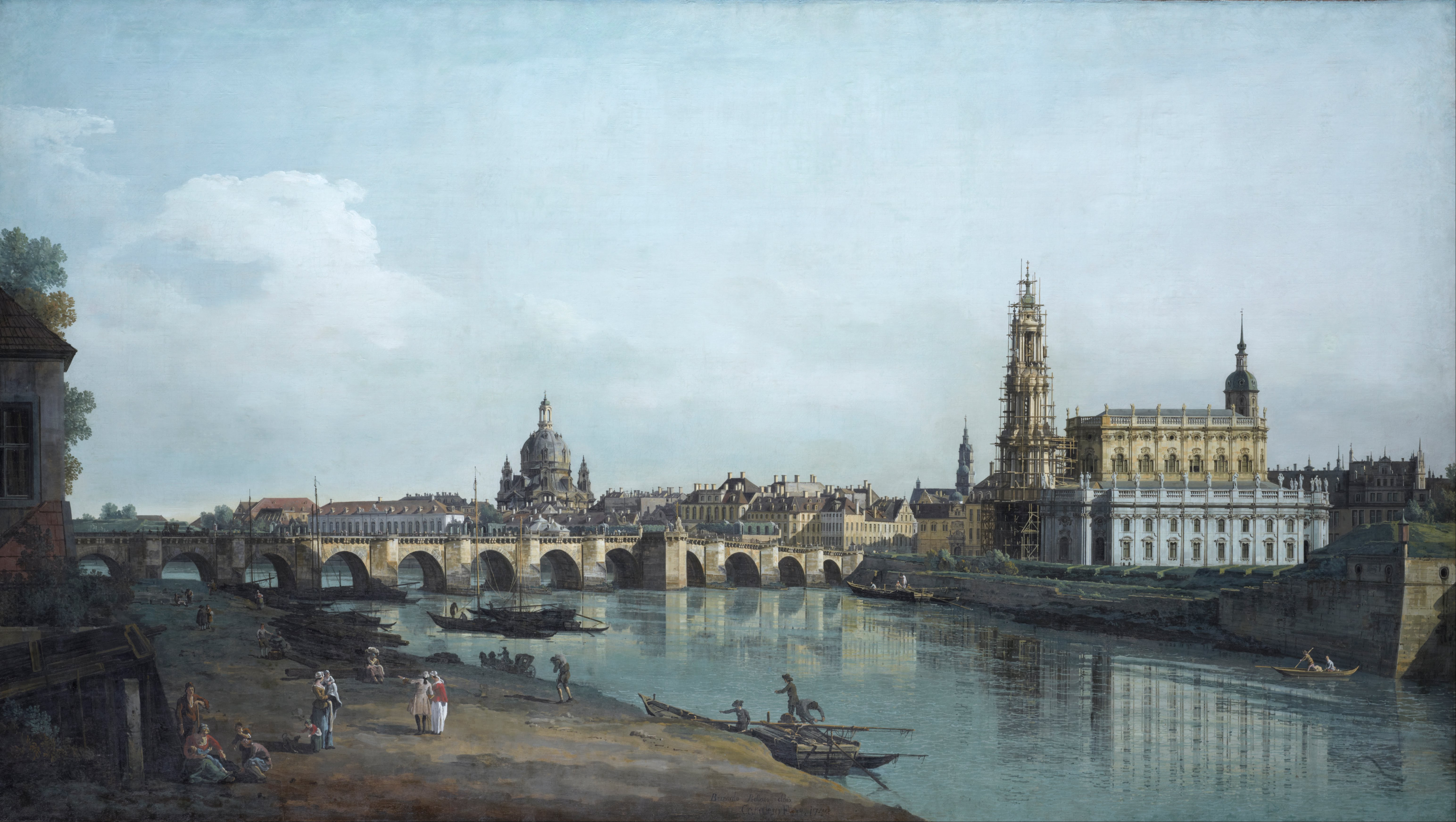
Bernardo Bellotto: Dresden From the Right Bank of the Elbe Below the Augustus Bridge, 1748, Gemäldegalerie Alte Meister, Dresden

Bellotto's original painting is now housed in the Museum of Art History in Vienna. Another Canaletto view based on Bellotto's cityscape can be found in Dresden. This view from the right bank of the Elbe River below the Augustus Bridge also played a significant role in urban planning discussions, particularly in the debate over the reconstruction of Dresden's city center, heavily damaged by air raids in 1945.

== Sources ==
- Karasz, Daniel-Pietro (2004). Der Canaletto-Blick als Messlatte des Wertvollen im Wiener urbanen Raum: ein anthropologischer Blick auf das Weltkulturerbe (Thesis) (in German). Universitat Wien.
- Kühn, Christian (2020). "Die Canaletto‐Maschine" (PDF). The Canaletto View (in German). Verlag der Buchhandlung Walther König. ISBN 978-3-96098-627-0.
