= Belvedere, Vienna =

Historic building complex and art museum in Vienna, Austria

Belvedere
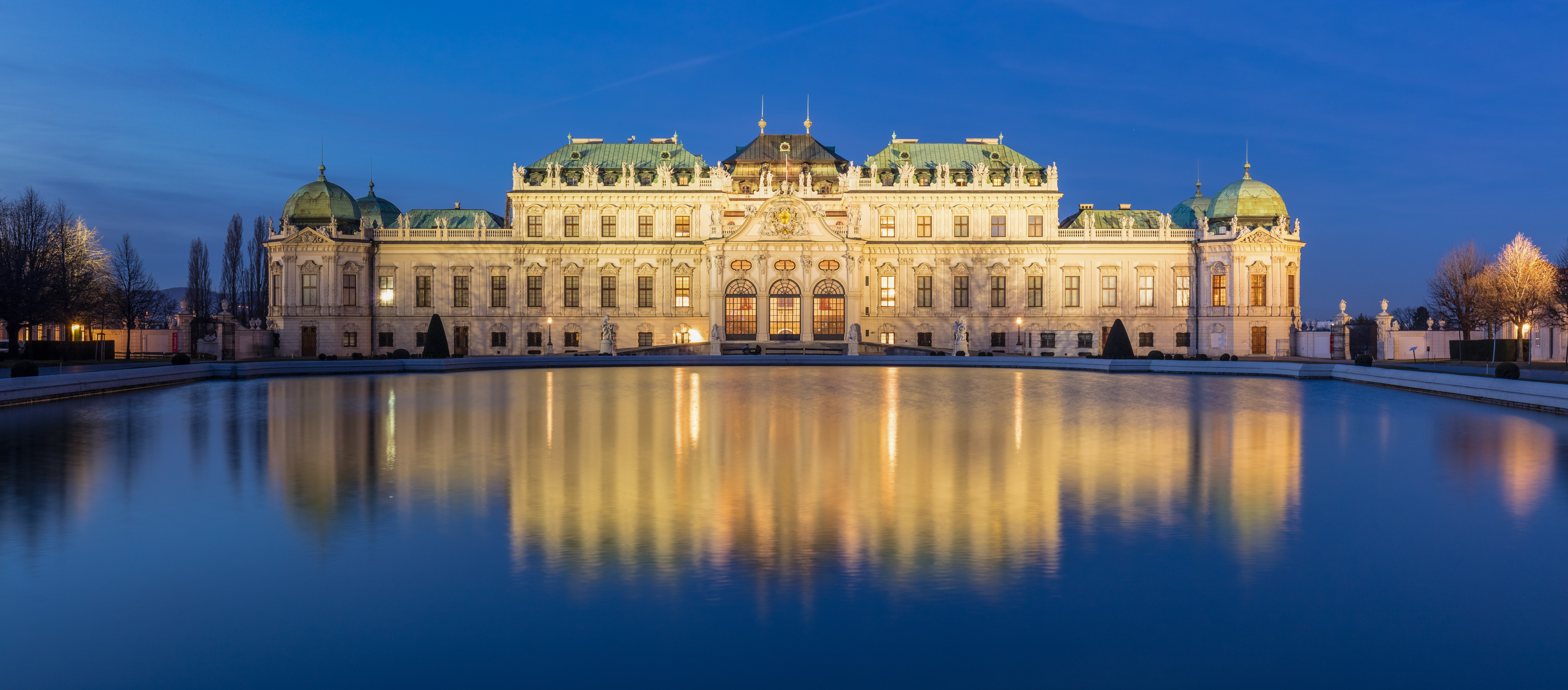
- Upper Belvedere at night, 2020
- Interactive map of Belvedere
- 48°11′39″N 16°22′49″E
- Location: Vienna, Austria

History
- Built: 1723
- Built for: Prince Eugene of Savoy
- Original use: Summer residence

Site notes
- Architect: Johann Lukas von Hildebrandt
- Architectural style: Baroque
- Current use: Museum
- Website: www.belvedere.at

UNESCO World Heritage Site

The Belvedere is a historic building complex and art museum in Vienna, Austria. The complex consists of two Baroque palaces, the Upper and Lower Belvedere, together with the Orangery, the Palace Stables, and a formal Baroque garden. It is located in the city's third district, Landstraße, on the south-eastern edge of Vienna's historic centre. Built as the summer residence of Prince Eugene of Savoy, the complex was designed principally by Johann Lukas von Hildebrandt and completed in the early eighteenth century.

Today the Belvedere is one of Austria's major art museums. The museum institution presents Austrian art from the Middle Ages to the present in an international context, with the Upper Belvedere housing the permanent collection, the Lower Belvedere used for special exhibitions, and Belvedere 21 devoted to contemporary Austrian and international art, film, and music. The Belvedere Palace and garden ensemble forms part of the Baroque heritage of the Historic Centre of Vienna, a World Heritage Site.

The Belvedere was built during a period of extensive construction in Vienna, which was then the imperial capital and residence city of the Habsburg monarchy. This period of prosperity followed Prince Eugene's successful military campaigns against the Ottoman Empire.

== Lower Belvedere ==
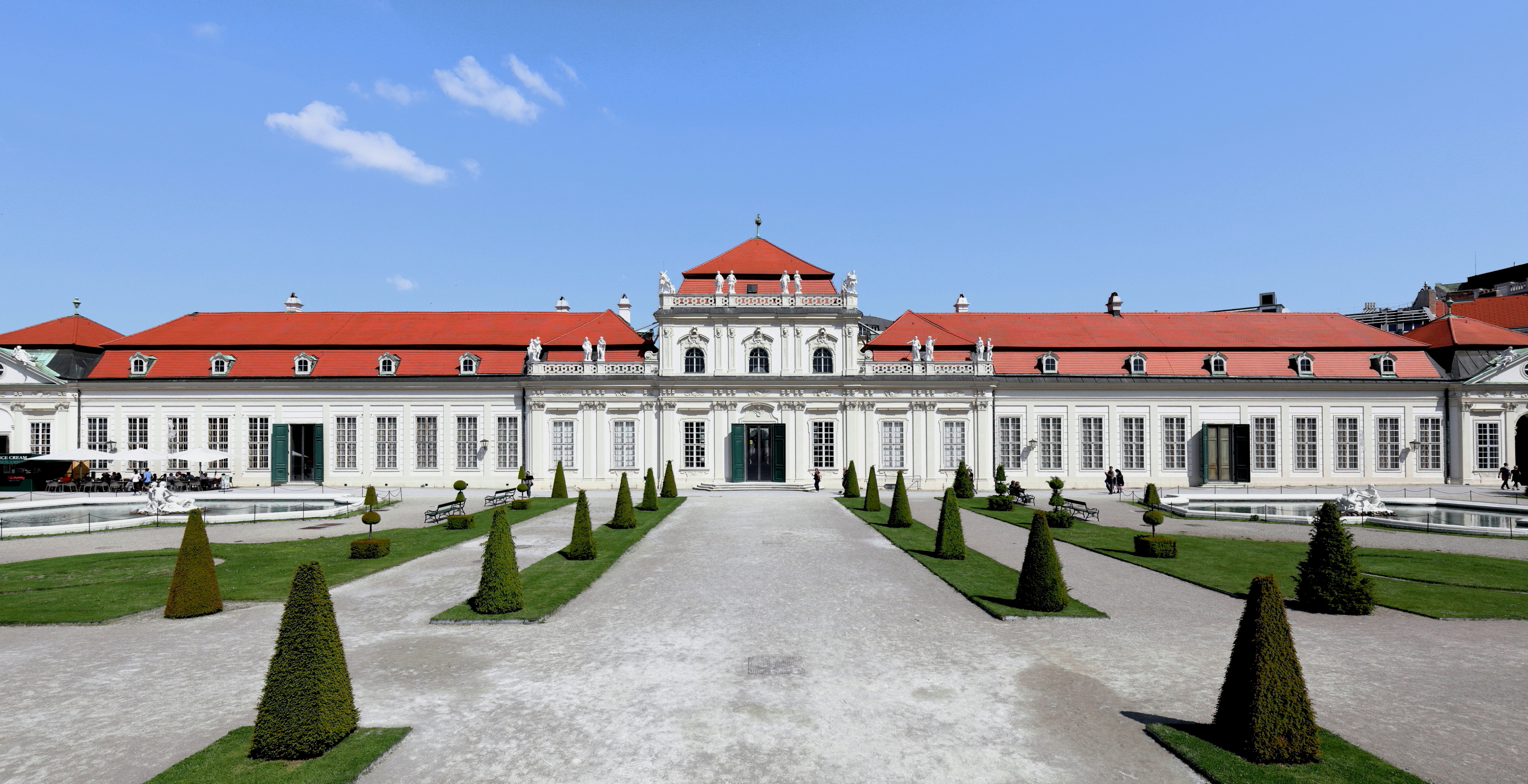
Lower Belvedere, May 2017

On 30 November 1697, one year after beginning construction of the Stadtpalais, Prince Eugene of Savoy purchased a plot of land south of the Rennweg, the main road to Hungary. Plans for the Belvedere garden complex were drawn up soon afterwards. The prince chose Johann Lukas von Hildebrandt as chief architect rather than Johann Bernhard Fischer von Erlach, the architect of his Stadtpalais.

Hildebrandt, whom Eugene had met during a military campaign in Piedmont, had already built Ráckeve Palace for him in 1702 on Csepel, an island in the Danube south of Budapest. He later designed several other buildings connected with Prince Eugene and the Austrian aristocracy, including Schloss Hof, the Schwarzenberg Palace, the Palais Kinsky, and work connected with Göttweig Abbey.

When Prince Eugene acquired the land for the Belvedere, the area was largely undeveloped and suitable for a landscaped garden and summer palace. He bought additional neighbouring plots in 1708, 1716, and 1717–18, allowing the garden to be expanded in stages.

Records indicate that construction of the Lower Belvedere had begun by 1712. Prince Eugene submitted a request for a building inspection on 5 July 1713. Work proceeded quickly, and Marcantonio Chiarini from Bologna began painting the quadratura in the central hall in 1715. A diplomatic representative from the southern Netherlands visited both the Lower Belvedere and the Stadtpalais in April 1716. The Lower Belvedere served as a Lustschloss, or pleasure palace, closely connected to the gardens.

== Gardens ==
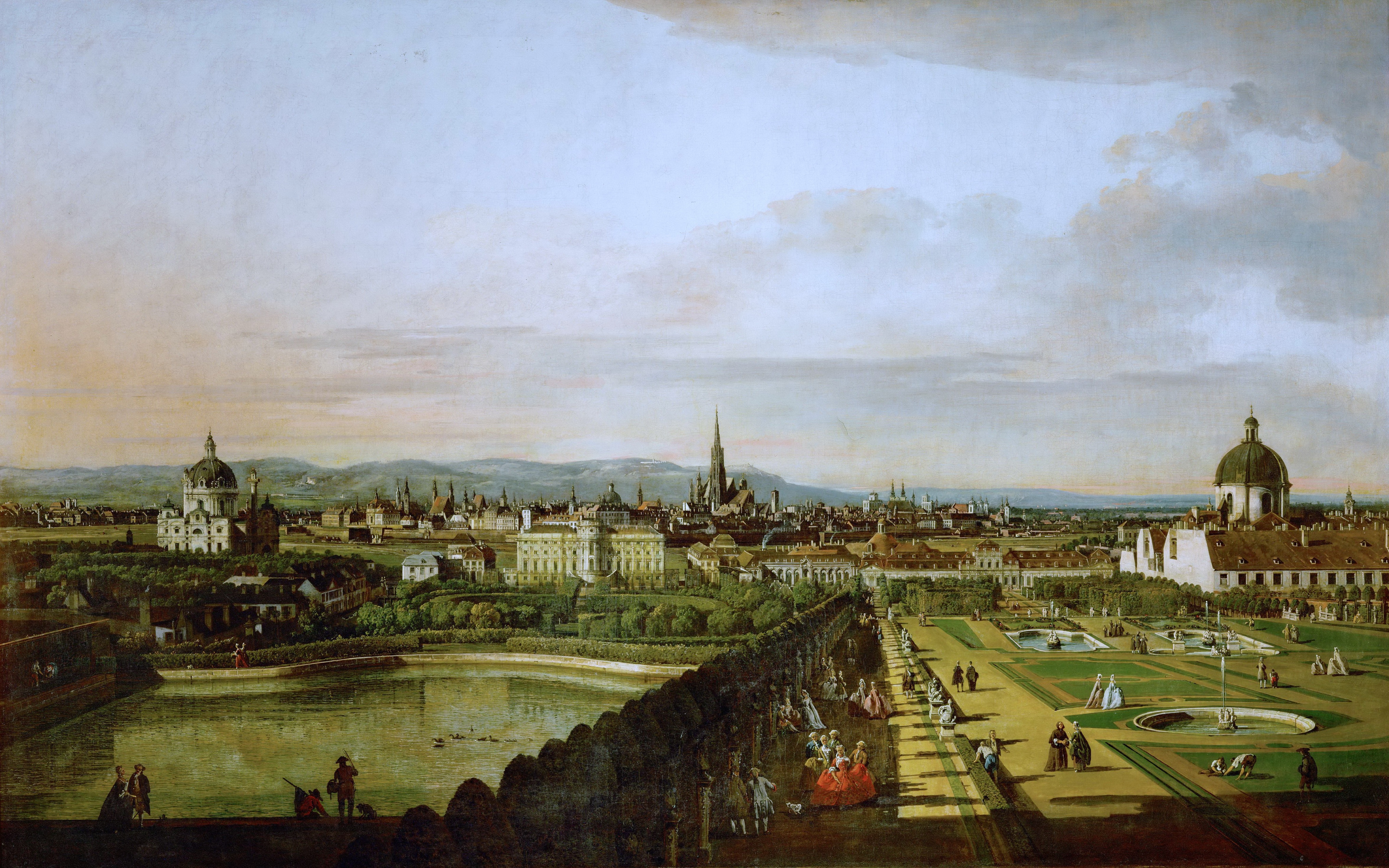
View of the gardens seen from the Upper Belvedere, painted by Bernardo Bellotto in 1758

The Belvedere Gardens were designed in the formal French manner by Dominique Girard, who had trained in the gardens of Versailles. The main garden extends between the Lower and Upper Belvedere over three large terraces. Its design includes symmetrical parterres, water basins, steps, cascades, clipped hedges, and sculptures.

The gardens contain extensive mythological references that allude to the rise of Prince Eugene, with a sculptural programme linking him to the god Apollo. A great water basin in the upper parterre and the stairs and cascades connecting the upper and lower parts of the garden survive, although the original patterned bedding was later replaced in part by lawns.

The painting View of Vienna from the Belvedere by Bernardo Bellotto depicts a famous perspective of Vienna's city centre, often known as the Canaletto Blick. This view, seen from the Upper Belvedere with the gardens in the foreground, has played a role in urban planning debates concerning the skyline of Vienna's historic centre.

== Upper Belvedere ==
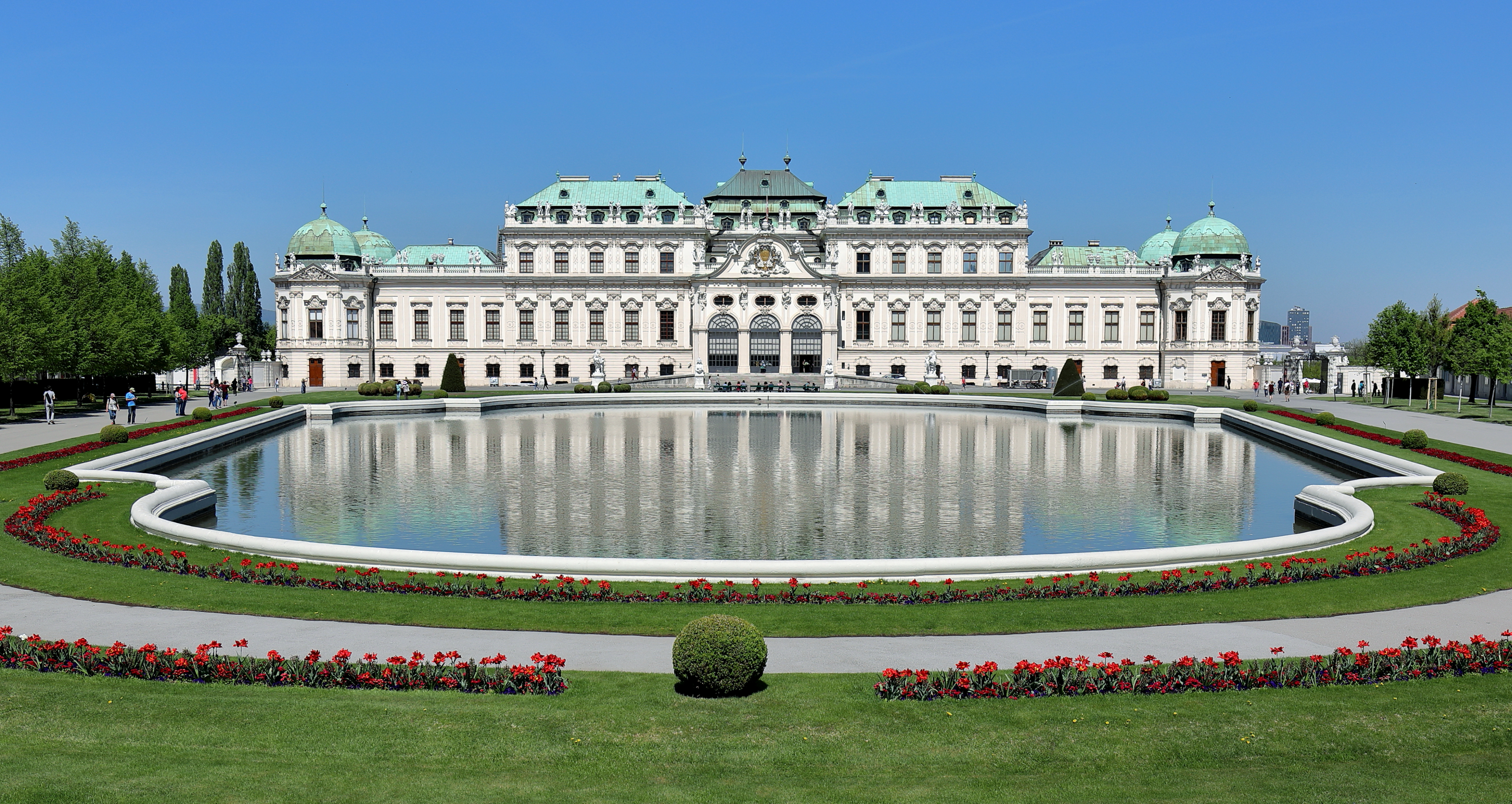
Upper Belvedere, April 2018

Construction of the Upper Belvedere began in the late 1710s and was completed in 1723. The palace was conceived less as a private residence than as a representative building for ceremonies, receptions, and display. Prince Eugene was able to receive the Turkish ambassador Ibrahim Pasha there in 1719, while decoration of the interior was still under way.

In 1719 Eugene commissioned the Italian painter Francesco Solimena to execute the altarpiece for the Palace Chapel and the ceiling painting in the Gold Cabinet. In the same year Gaetano Fanti was commissioned to produce illusionistic quadratura painting in the Marble Hall. In 1720 Carlo Innocenzo Carlone was entrusted with the ceiling fresco in the Marble Hall, which he executed between 1721 and 1723.

The Sala Terrena later developed structural problems. In the winter of 1732–33 Hildebrandt installed a vaulted ceiling supported by four Atlas pillars, giving the room its present appearance. The engineer Salomon Kleiner documented the Belvedere complex in a ten-part publication produced between 1731 and 1740, containing ninety plates and showing the state of the ensemble in the first half of the eighteenth century.

The Upper Belvedere appears on the Austrian 20-cent euro coin.

== After the death of Prince Eugene ==
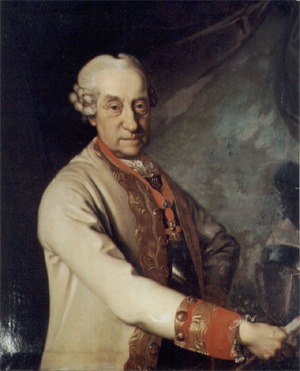
Prince Joseph of Saxe-Hildburghausen

Prince Eugene died in his City Palace in Vienna on 21 April 1736 without leaving a legally binding will. A commission set up by Charles VI, Holy Roman Emperor, named Eugene's niece Princess Maria Anna Victoria of Savoy as his heir. She moved into the Belvedere, then known as the Gartenpalais, in July 1736 but soon sought to sell the estate.

In 1752 Maria Theresa acquired the complex. The imperial family did not use the Belvedere as a principal residence, and for a time the buildings remained underused. Maria Theresa later created an ancestors' gallery of the Habsburg dynasty in the Lower Belvedere. In 1770 a masked ball was held there to mark the marriage of Archduchess Maria Antonia, the future Marie Antoinette, to the French Dauphin, later Louis XVI.

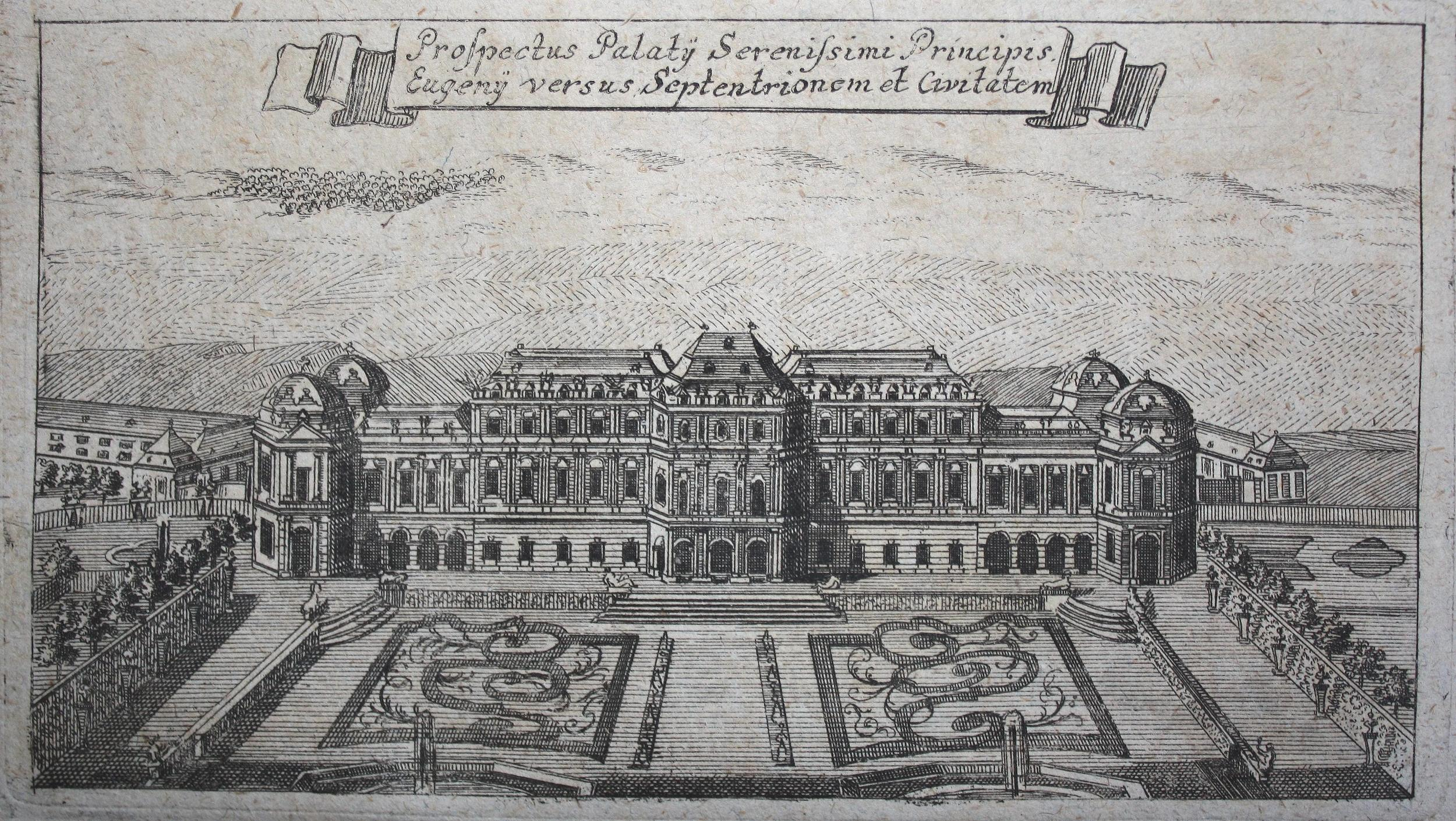
Upper Belvedere, engraving c. 1753

In 1776 Maria Theresa and her son, Emperor Joseph II, decided to transfer the Imperial Picture Gallery from the Stallburg to the Upper Belvedere. Influenced by the ideals of enlightened absolutism, the imperial collection was to be made accessible to the public. The Belvedere's own chronology gives 1777 as the inauguration of the Picture Gallery at the Upper Belvedere; other sources date the public opening to 1781. It is often described as one of the world's first public art museums.

While the Upper Belvedere was used as a picture gallery, the Lower Belvedere housed members of the royal family fleeing the French Revolution, including Marie Thérèse Charlotte, the surviving child of Marie Antoinette and Louis XVI, and Archduke Ferdinand, formerly governor of the Duchy of Milan.

After the Treaty of Pressburg (1805), the Habsburg Monarchy ceded Tyrol to Bavaria, and a new home had to be found for the imperial collection from Ambras Castle near Innsbruck. In 1811 Emperor Francis II ordered that the Ambras Collection be installed in the Lower Belvedere. From 1833 the Collection of Egyptian Antiquities and the Antiquities Room were added to the Lower Belvedere collection. This situation remained largely unchanged until the collections were moved to the newly built Kunsthistorisches Museum on the Ringstraße in 1888–89.

== Belvedere and Franz Ferdinand ==
After the relocation of the imperial collections, both Belvedere palaces ceased for a time to function as public museums. In 1896 Emperor Franz Joseph I decided that the Upper Belvedere should serve as the official residence of the heir to the throne, Archduke Franz Ferdinand of Austria. Franz Ferdinand had the palace remodelled under the supervision of architect Emil von Förster.

The Moderne Galerie opened in the Lower Belvedere on 2 May 1903. It was the first state collection in Austria devoted to modern art and was established partly through the efforts of the Vienna Secession. Its aim was to present Austrian art in dialogue with international modernism. Early acquisitions included works by Vincent van Gogh, Claude Monet, and Giovanni Segantini. In 1912 the museum was converted into the Austrian State Gallery, presenting Austrian art from the Middle Ages to the present.

The assassination of Franz Ferdinand and his wife Sophie, Duchess of Hohenberg, the outbreak of World War I, and the collapse of the Habsburg Monarchy in 1918 marked the beginning of a new period for the Belvedere.

== Belvedere in the First and Second Republic ==
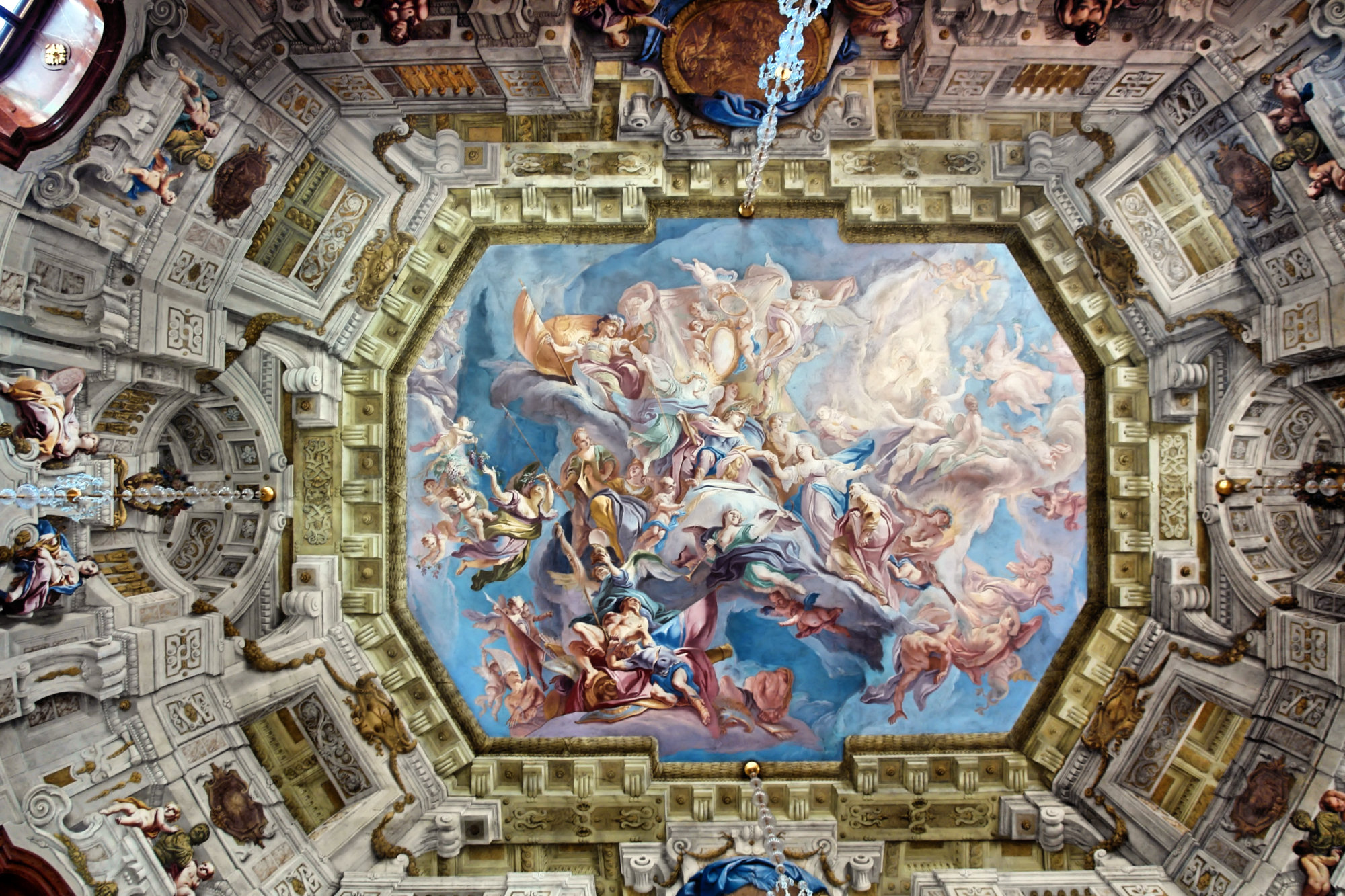
Ceiling painting of the Marble Hall in the Upper Belvedere, by Carlo Innocenzo Carlone

After the end of World War I, the art historian Franz Haberditzl asked the Ministry of Education to assign the Belvedere palaces to the Staatsgalerie. This request was granted in 1919. The reorganisation of the former imperial collections, prepared by Hans Tietze in 1920–21, included plans for an Österreichische Galerie and a Moderne Galerie. During the reorganisation of 1921–23, the Baroque Museum was added in the Lower Belvedere. The Moderne Galerie opened in the Orangery in 1929.

The palaces suffered damage during World War II, including damage to the Marble Hall in the Upper Belvedere and the Hall of Grotesques in the Lower Belvedere. Restoration work continued after 1945. In 1950 a fire beginning in the Golden Cabinet on the upper floor of the Upper Belvedere damaged several rooms and works displayed there. The Österreichische Galerie reopened on 4 February 1953, followed by the Baroque Museum. The Museum of Medieval Austrian Art opened in the Orangery on 5 December 1953.

On 15 May 1955, the Austrian State Treaty was signed at the Upper Belvedere. The treaty re-established Austria as an independent and democratic state after the Allied occupation that followed World War II.

In 1996 the World Monuments Fund added the Belvedere gardens to its Watch List, citing the need for restoration of the historic garden ensemble and parts of the architectural fabric. Subsequent restoration and modernisation campaigns addressed the gardens, the Sala Terrena, the grand staircase, and exhibition infrastructure.

The Lower Belvedere and the Orangery were later adapted for special exhibitions. After an invitation-only competition, architect Susanne Zottl converted the Orangery into a modern exhibition space while preserving its Baroque fabric. The venue opened in March 2007 with the exhibition Gartenlust: Der Garten in der Kunst (Garden Pleasures: The Garden in Art). A few months later the Lower Belvedere reopened following redesign work by the Berlin architect Wilfried Kuehn. The Baroque state rooms, including the Marble Gallery, Golden Room, and Hall of Grotesques, remain open to the public.

== Museum and collection ==
The Belvedere museum institution operates three venues: the Upper Belvedere, the Lower Belvedere, and Belvedere 21. The Upper Belvedere houses the permanent collection, the Lower Belvedere is used for temporary exhibitions, and Belvedere 21 presents contemporary Austrian and international art, film, and music.

The museum describes its collection as spanning Austrian art from the Middle Ages to the present in a global context. The permanent collection includes works by Gustav Klimt, Egon Schiele, Oskar Kokoschka, Helene Funke, Ferdinand Georg Waldmüller, Franz Xaver Messerschmidt, Claude Monet, Vincent van Gogh, and Auguste Rodin. The Belvedere holds an important collection of works by Gustav Klimt, including The Kiss.

The permanent presentation at the Upper Belvedere is titled Picture this! The Belvedere Collection from Cranach to Lassnig and presents around eight hundred years of art history from the Middle Ages to the 1970s.

The Belvedere also maintains research, conservation, collection, communication, digital, and outreach programmes. The museum describes its central tasks as exhibiting, researching, collecting, communicating, and preserving. More than half of the Belvedere's collection is available through its online collection database.

=== Public programming ===
The Belvedere's public programming includes guided tours, community outreach formats, public programmes, and film events at the Blickle Kino in Belvedere 21. Since 2019 the museum has presented Queering the Belvedere, a Pride Month programme that examines the collection and the institution's history from queer perspectives.

The 2026 programme includes tours with art educator Francesca Liva and art historian Kero Fichter addressing, among other topics, Isabella of Parma and her correspondence with Archduchess Maria Christina, and Curt Stenvert's Lesbia contra Motor in relation to female same-sex sexuality and visualisations outside sexual norms.

== Provenance research and restitution ==
The Belvedere conducts provenance research into works created before 1945 and acquired since 1933, in accordance with Austria's 1998 Art Restitution Act. The museum states that this research concerns roughly 5,400 paintings, sculptures, and graphic works. Since 1999 dossiers prepared by the Belvedere have been submitted to Austria's Commission for Provenance Research and to the Art Restitution Advisory Board, which issues recommendations on restitution.

Several restitution cases have involved works held by, formerly held by, or historically associated with the Belvedere:

- In 2006, Austria returned five paintings by Gustav Klimt from the Belvedere to the heirs of Ferdinand and Adele Bloch-Bauer, including Portrait of Adele Bloch-Bauer I.
- In November 2006, after a long-running dispute, Edvard Munch's Summer Night at the Beach, then in the Belvedere Gallery, was returned to Marina Fistoulari-Mahler, granddaughter and heir of Alma Mahler.
- Also in 2006, the Austrian arbitration panel decided that Gustav Klimt's unfinished Portrait of Amalie Zuckerkandl should remain in the Belvedere. The decision attracted criticism because Amalie Zuckerkandl and her daughter were murdered in the Holocaust and because of unresolved questions concerning the painting's ownership history.
- In 2012 the documentary Portrait of Wally drew renewed attention to Egon Schiele's Portrait of Wally, which had belonged to the Viennese art dealer Lea Bondi before being seized by the Nazi art dealer Friedrich Welz. After World War II the painting was mistakenly returned to the Belvedere as part of another dealer's collection before later passing to Rudolf Leopold.
- In 2014, the Belvedere was required to restitute Wilhelm Leibl's Farmer's Kitchen / Kitchen Interior to the heirs of Martha Liebermann, widow of Max Liebermann, because of Nazi persecution.
- In 2020, Austria's Art Restitution Advisory Board recommended the restitution of Egon Schiele's Four Trees / Autumn Allée to the heirs of Josef Morgenstern. Holocaust survivor Alice Morgenstern had filed a claim in 1959 stating that the work had belonged to her family and had not been sold voluntarily.

== Gallery ==
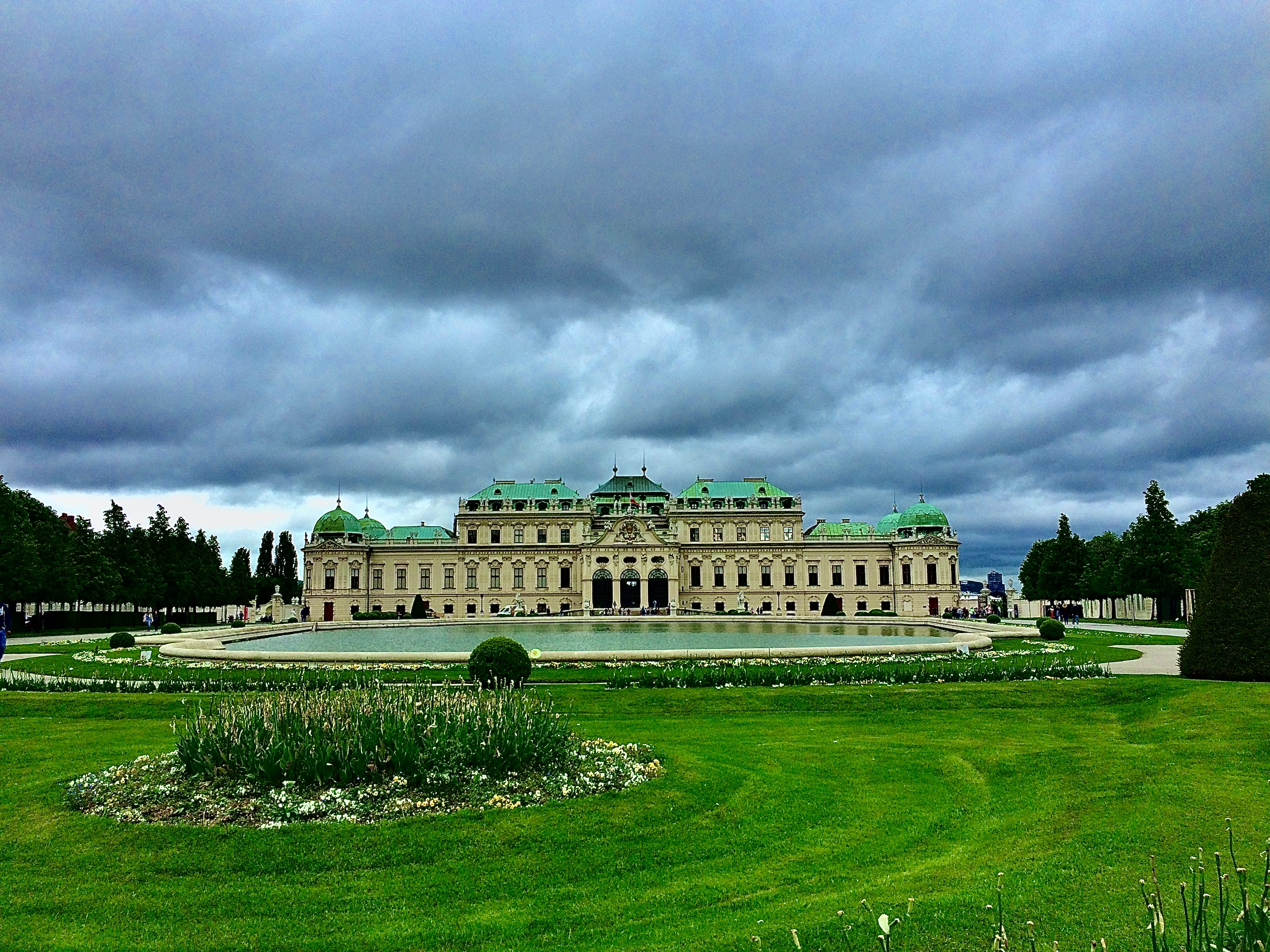
Upper Belvedere

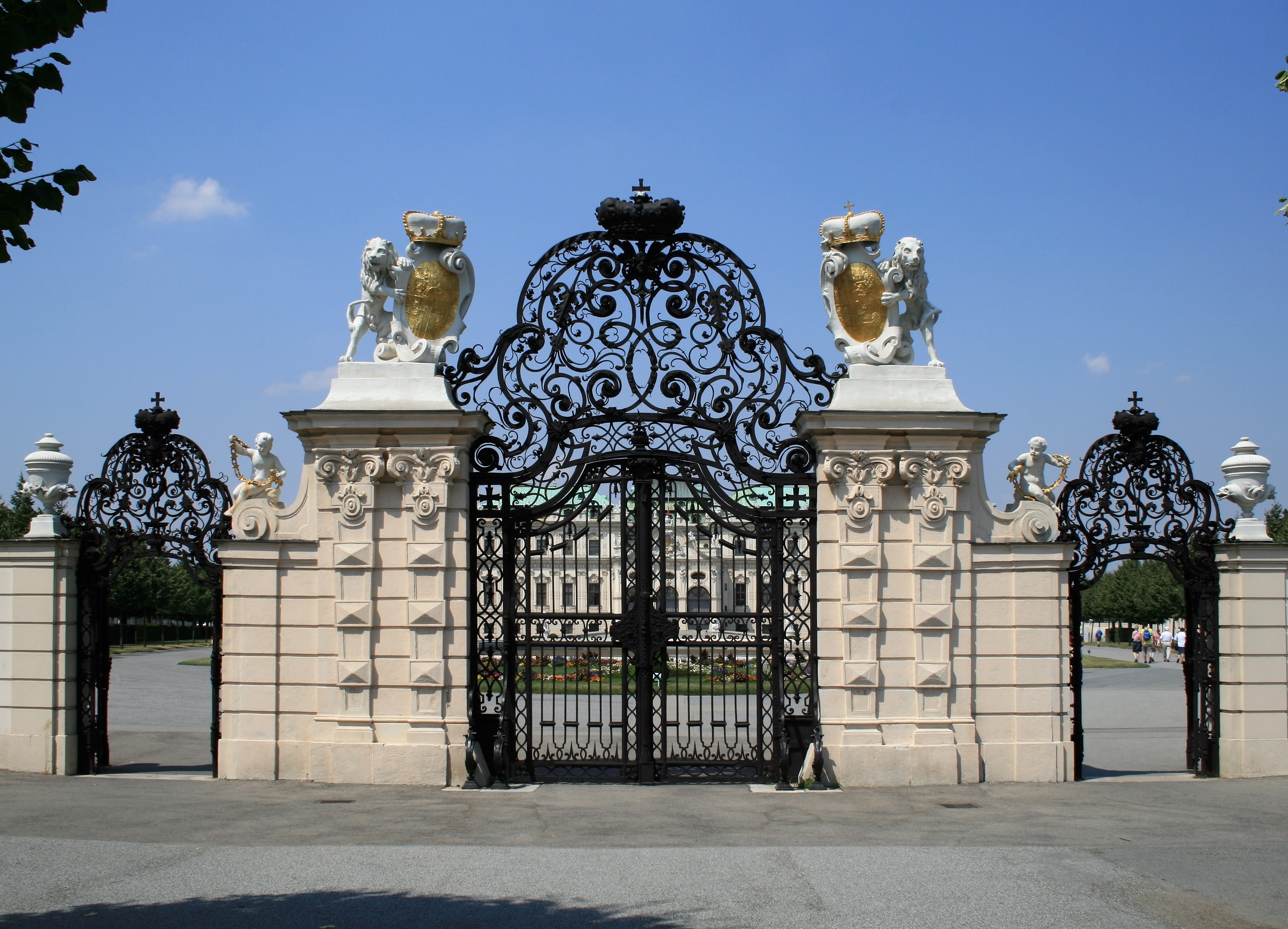
Gates of Belvedere

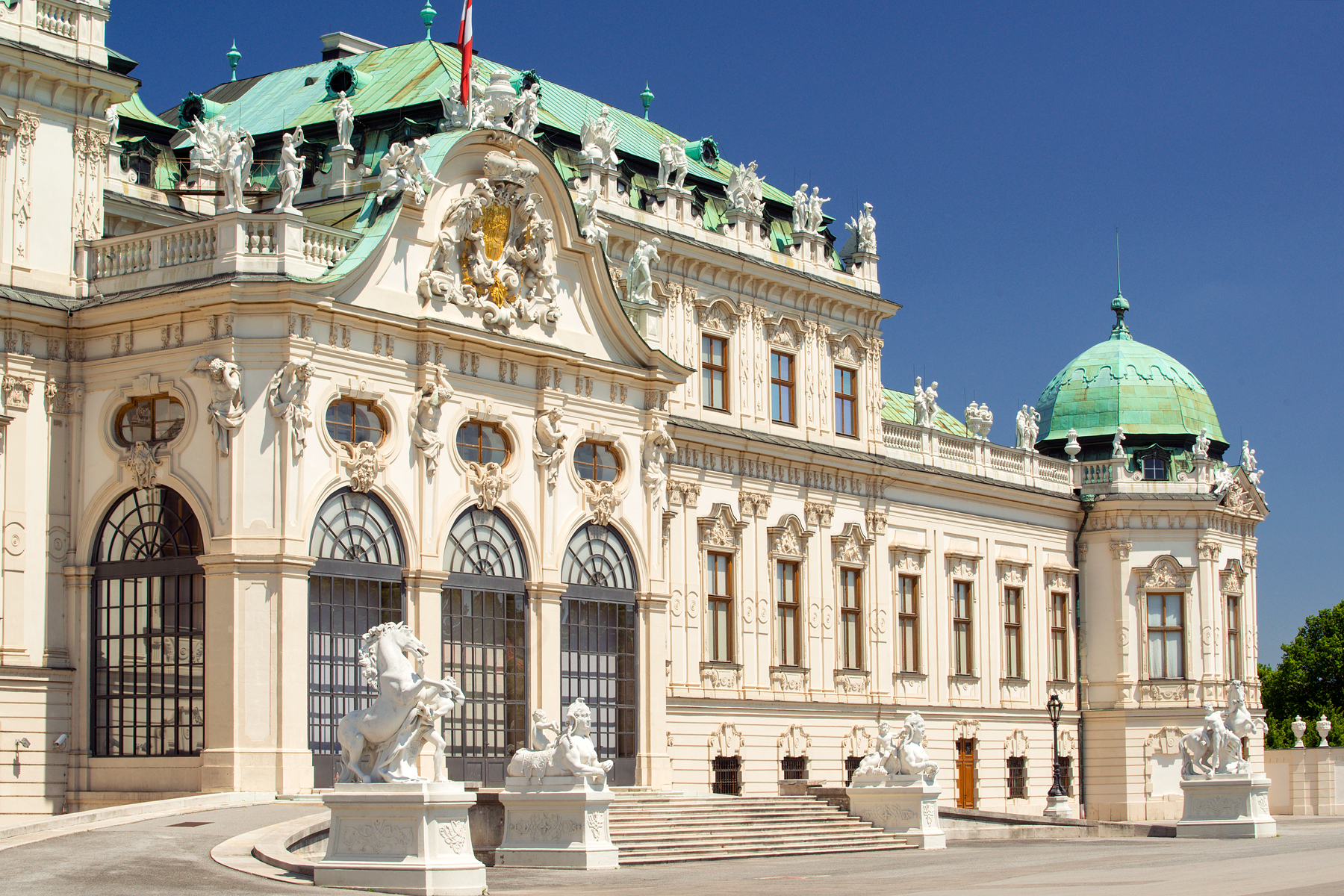
Upper Belvedere entrance

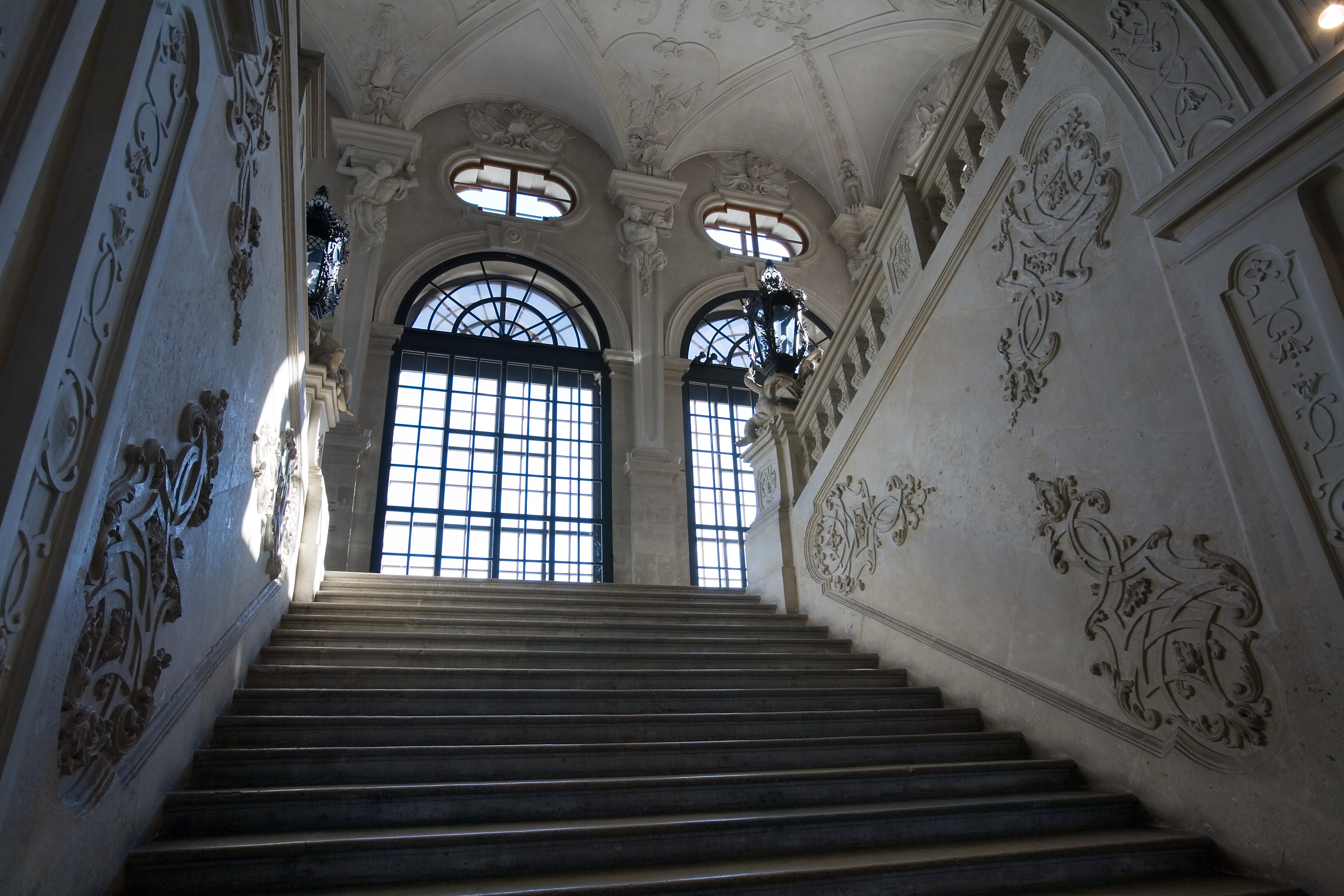
Upper Belvedere interior

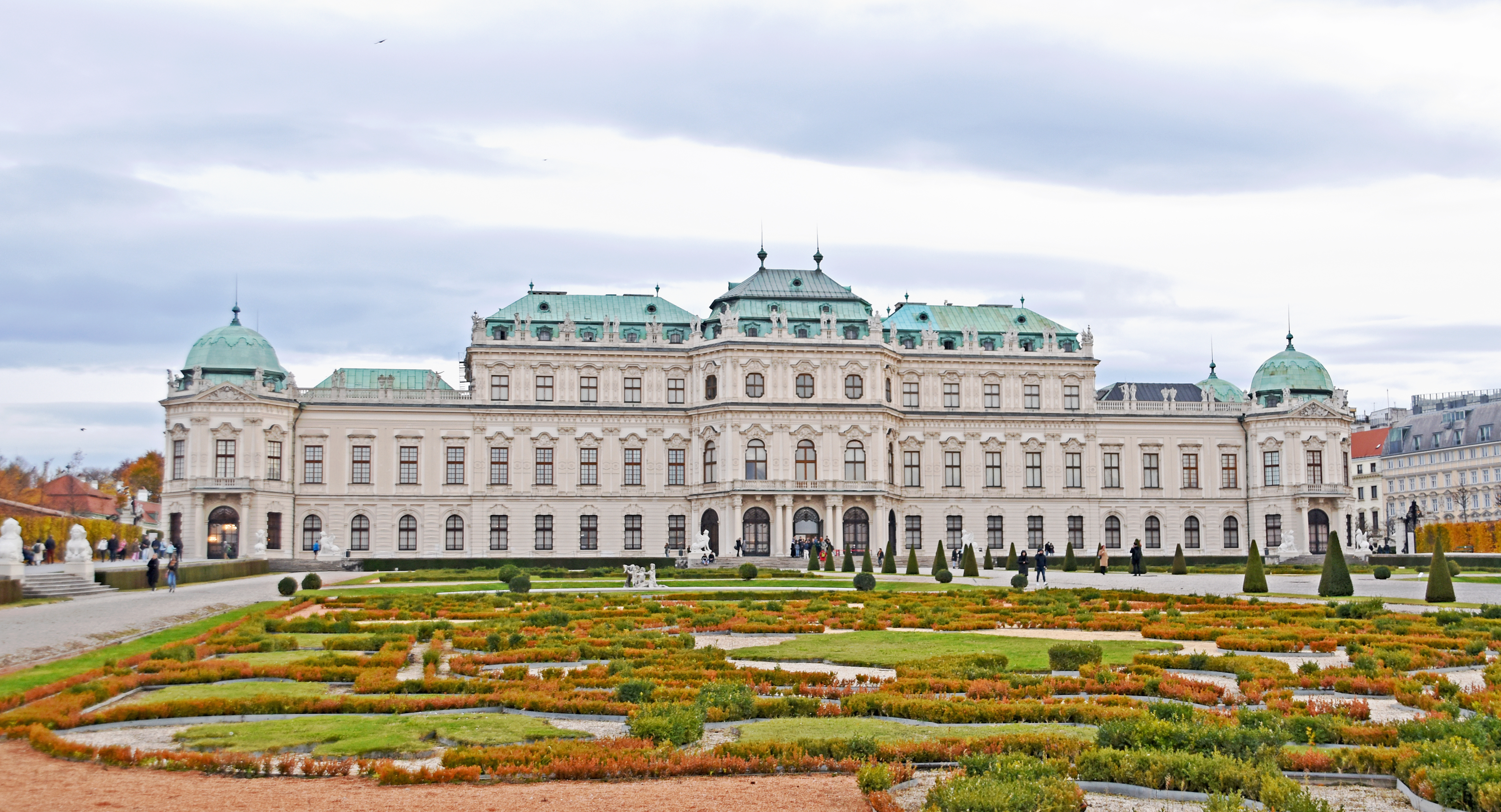
Upper Belvedere, garden side

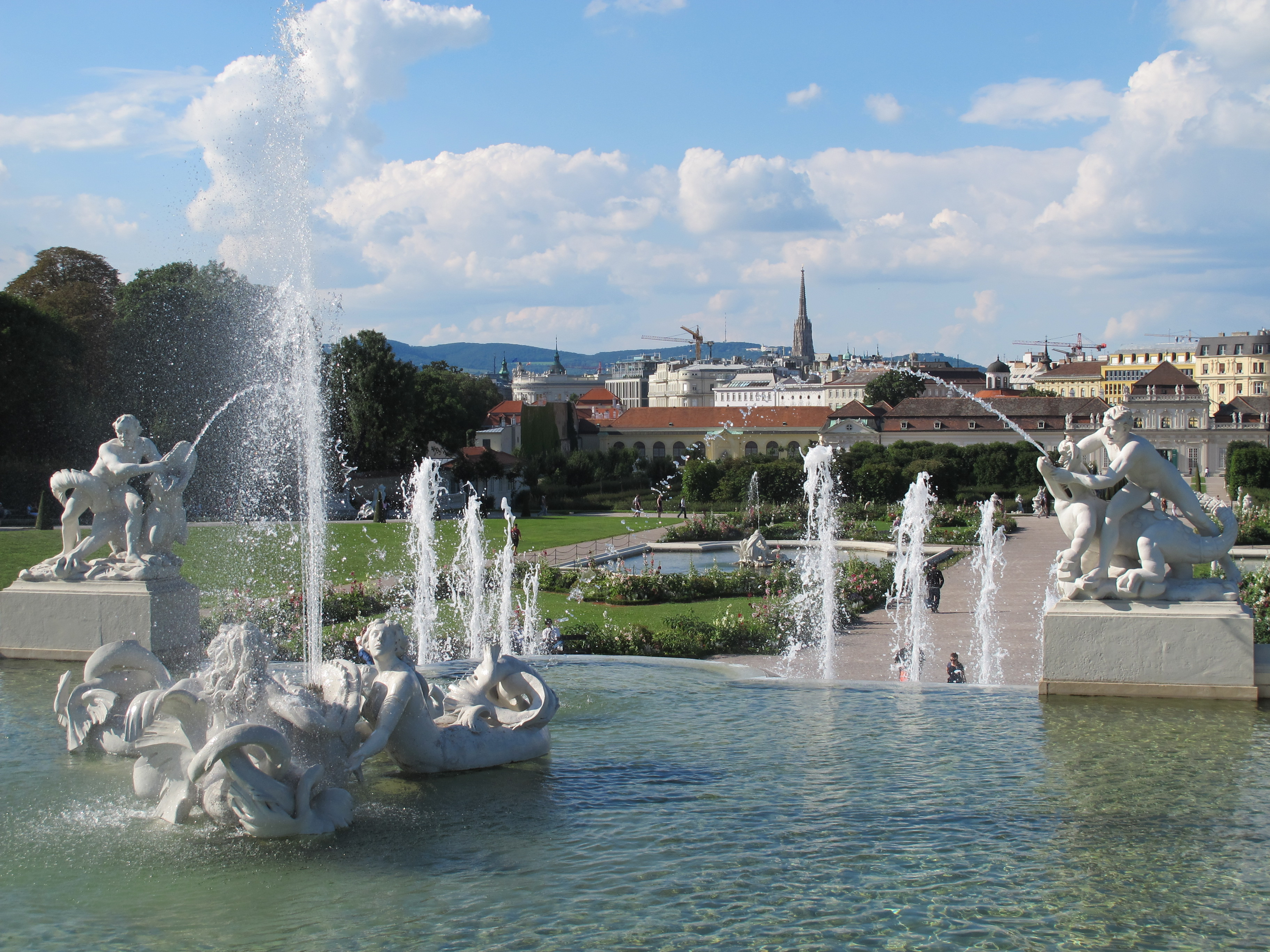
Belvedere Gardens

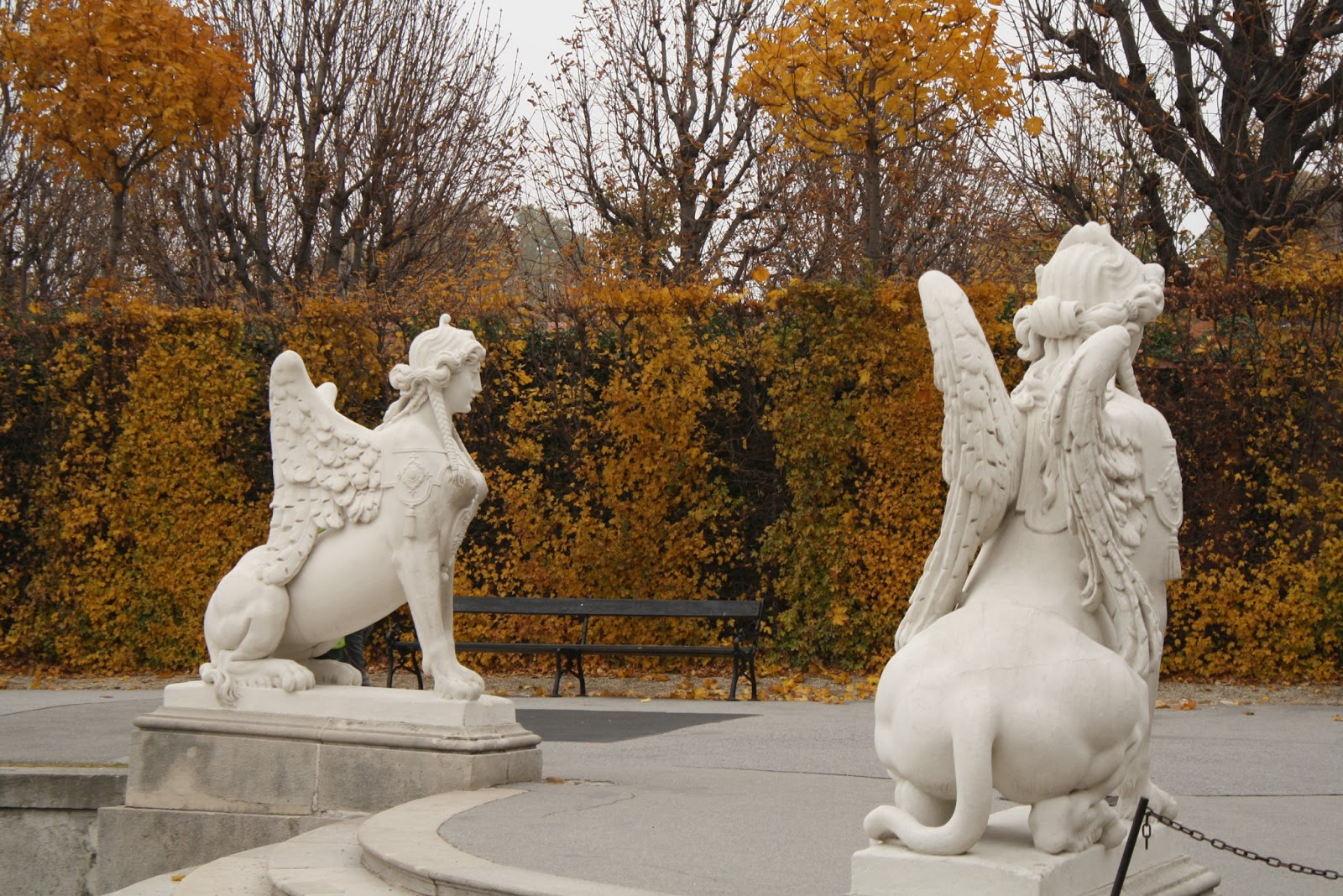
Sphinx sculptures, Belvedere Gardens

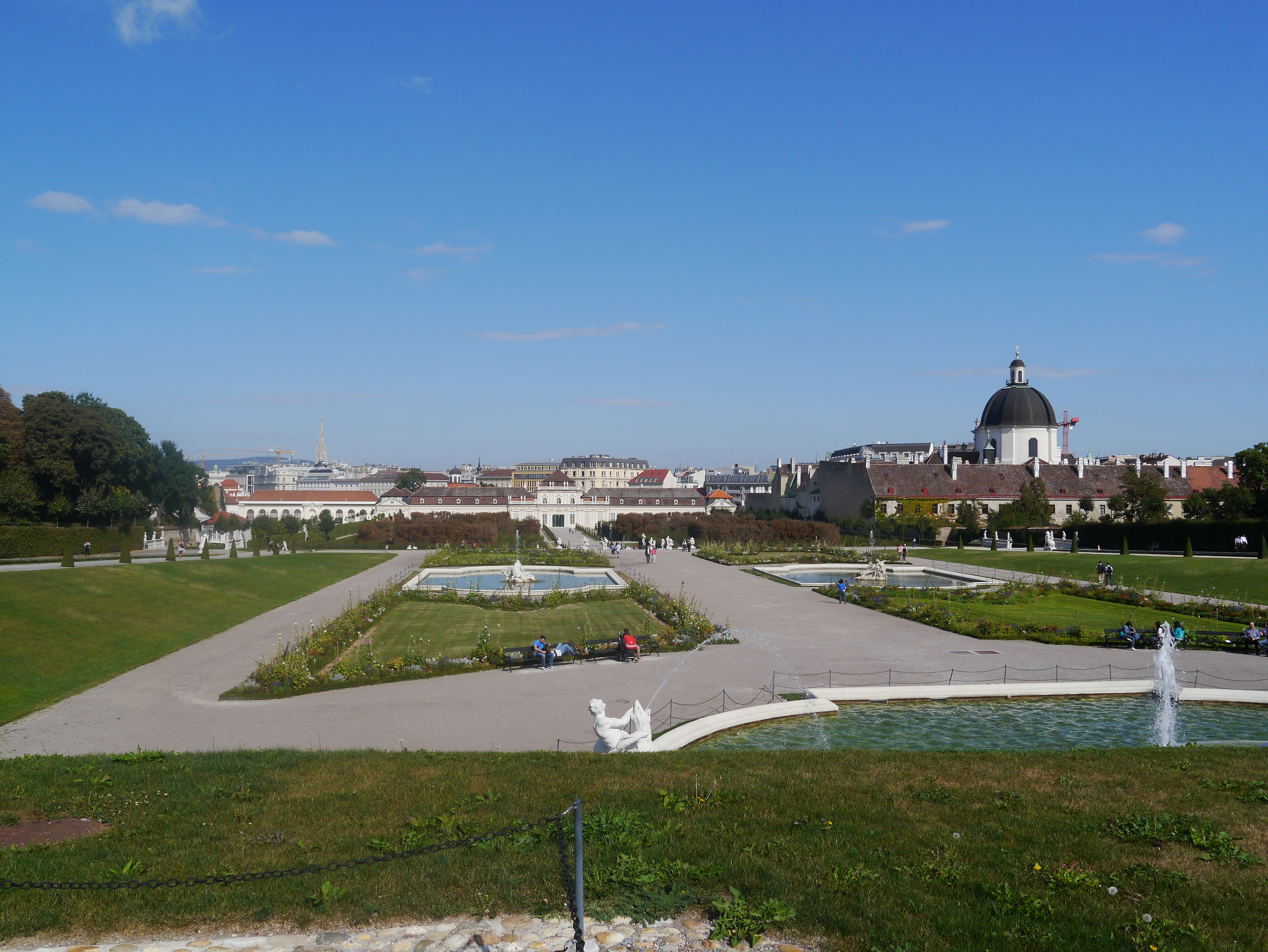
Belvedere Gardens

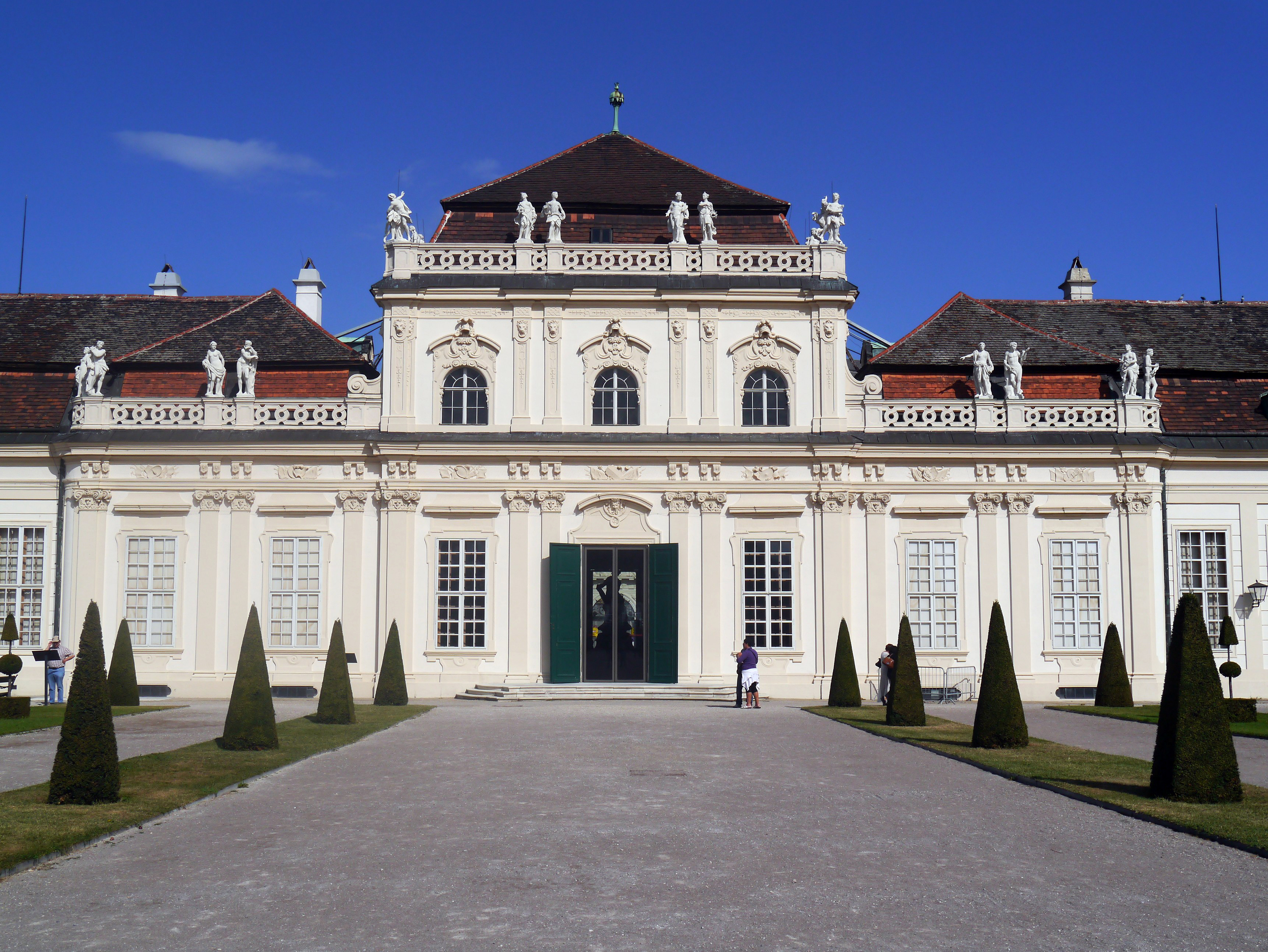
Lower Belvedere

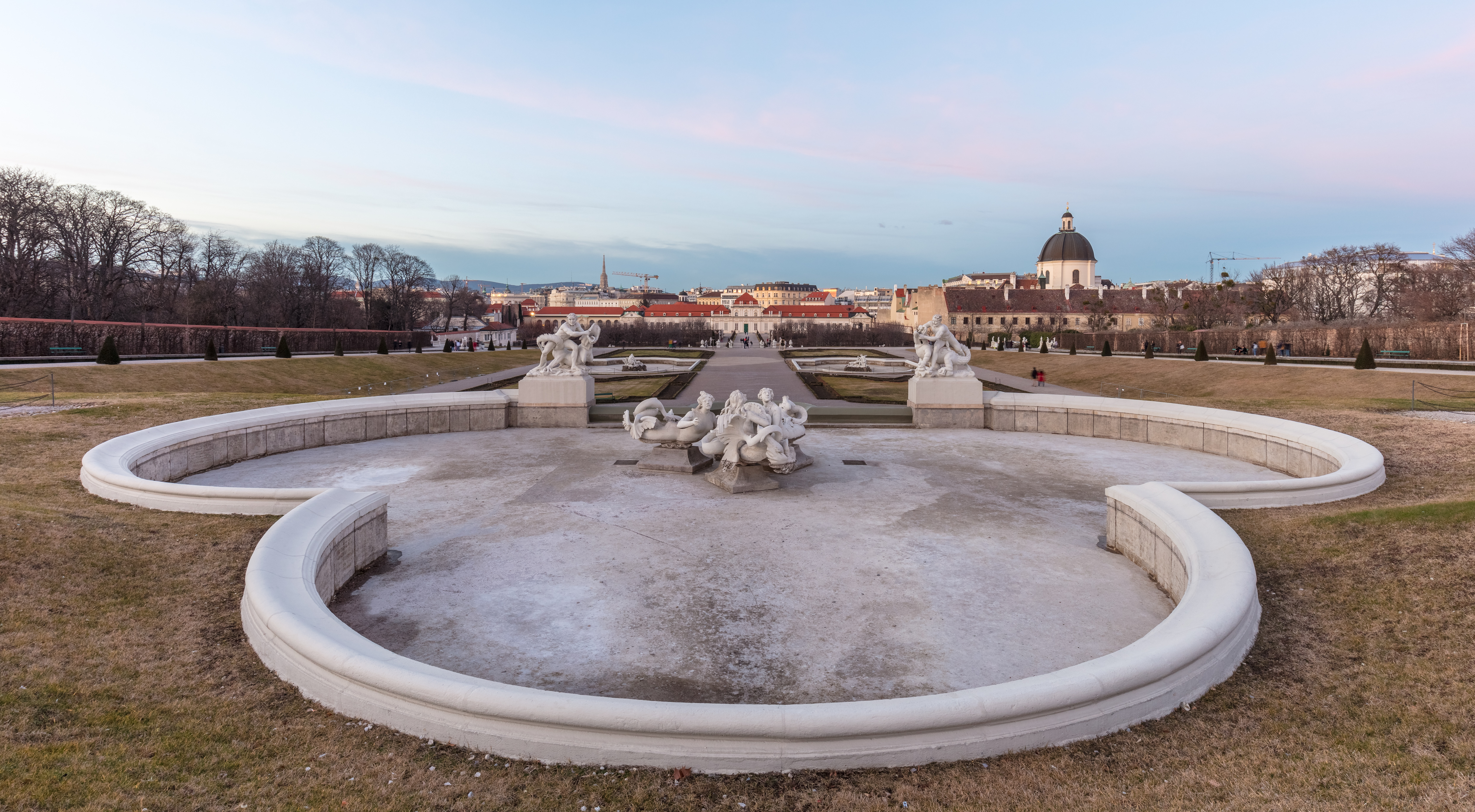
View of Lower Belvedere from the top

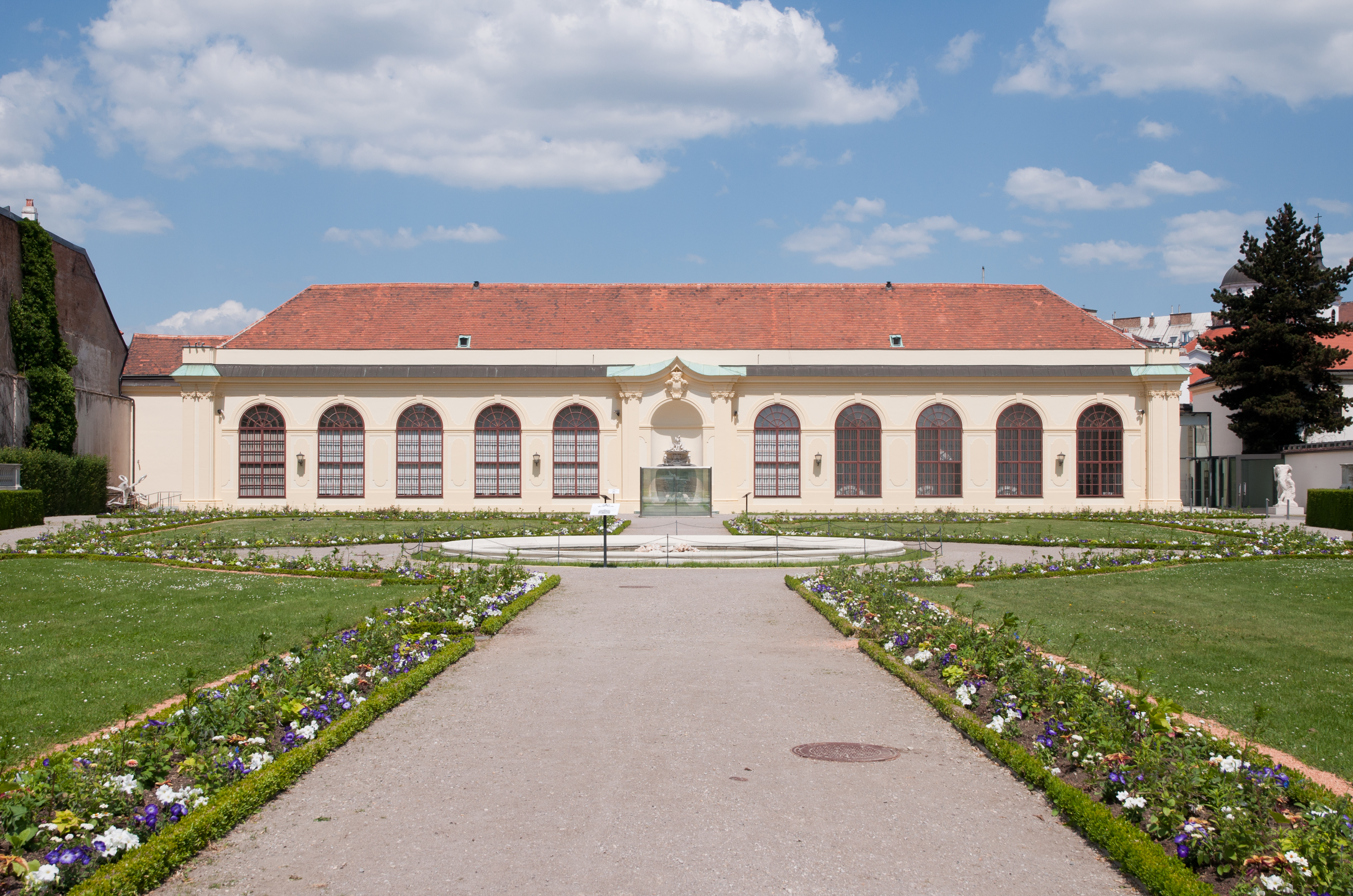
Lower Belvedere Orangery

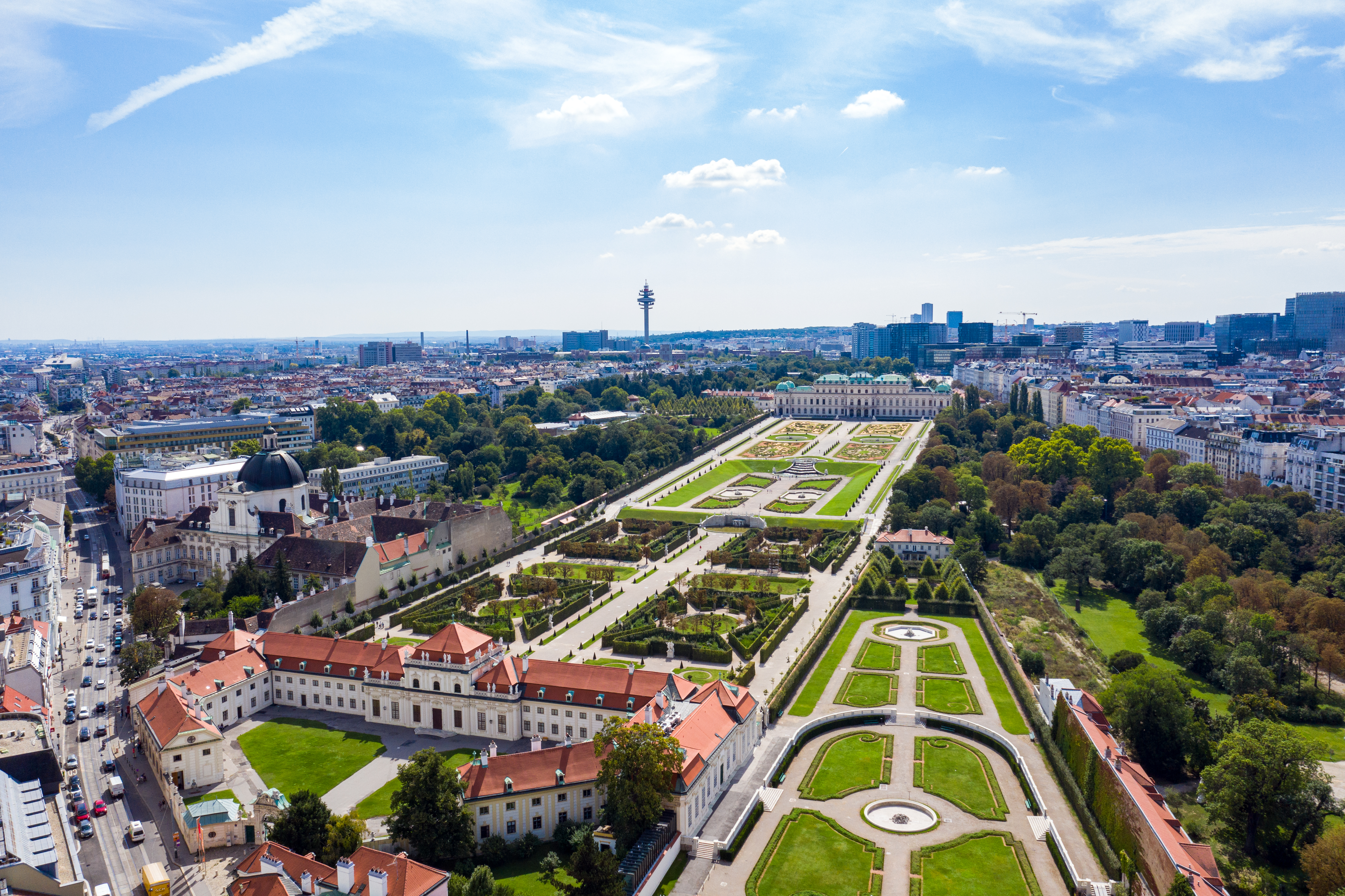
Aerial view

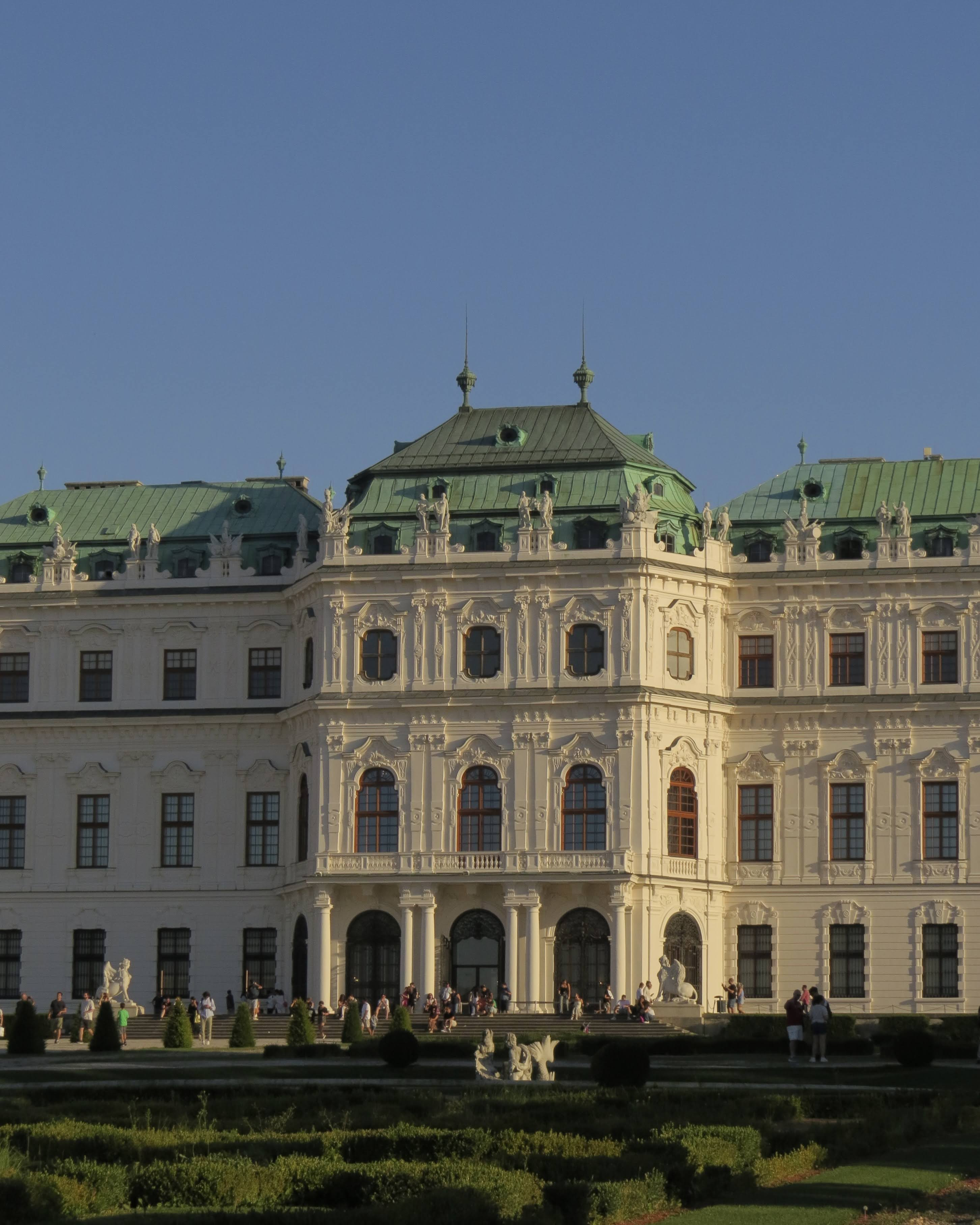
Visitors in front of the Belvedere, 2025

== See also ==
- List of Baroque residences
- Belvedere 21
- Österreichische Galerie Belvedere
- Historic Centre of Vienna
