= Dresden From the Right Bank of the Elbe Below the Augustus Bridge =

Painting by Bernardo Bellotto

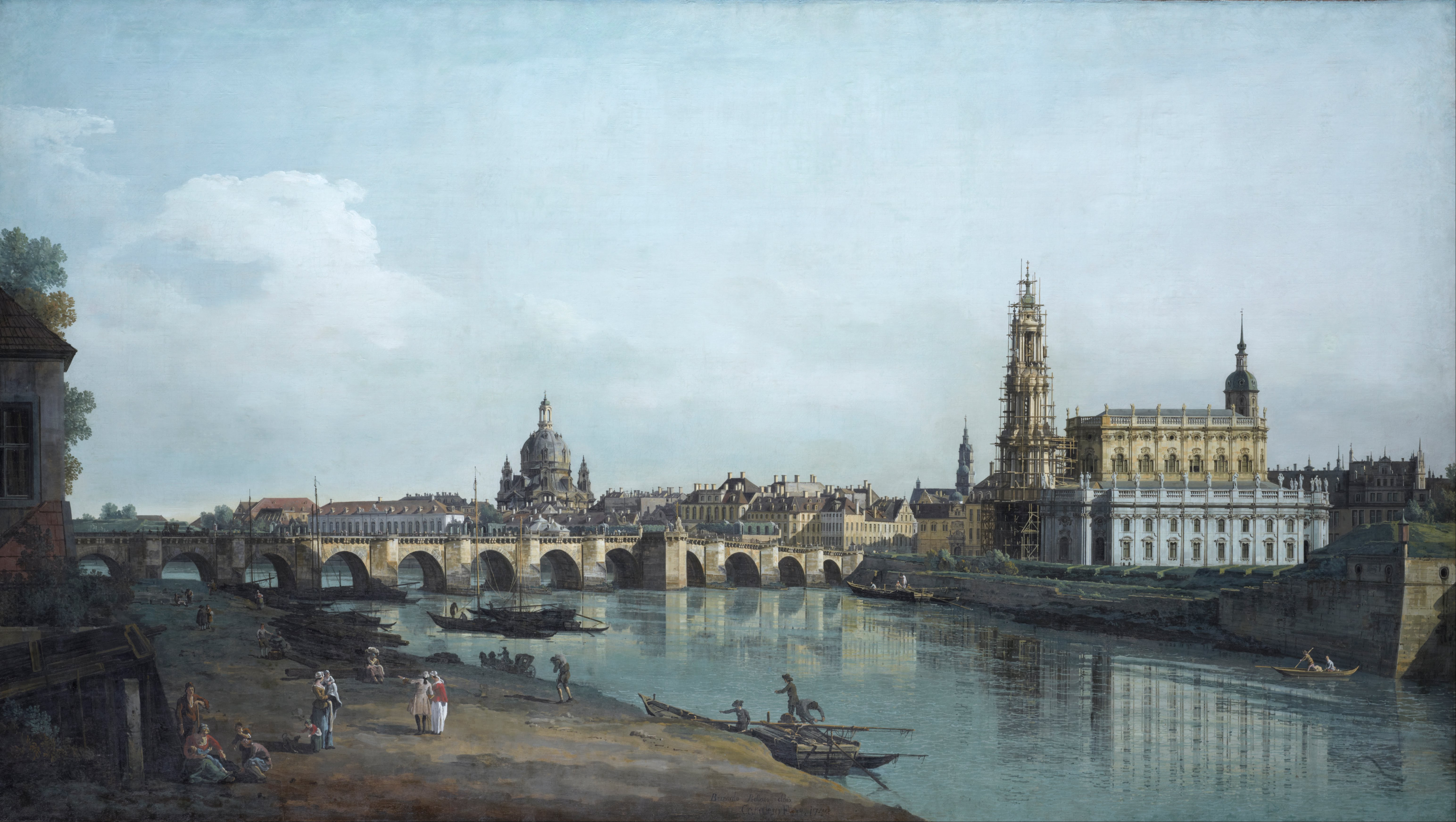
- Artist: Bernardo Bellotto
- Year: 1748
- Medium: Oil on canvas
- Dimensions: 133 cm × 237 cm (in in × 93 in)
- Location: Gemäldegalerie Alte Meister; Dresden

Dresden From the Right Bank of the Elbe Below the Augustus Bridge is an oil painting on canvas executed in 1748 by the Italian urban landscape painter Bernardo Bellotto. It depicts the view of Dresden from the right bank of the River Elbe, including the Dresden Frauenkirche, the Dresden Cathedral (still under construction and covered in scaffolding), and the Augustus Bridge. One year earlier, he painted another piece titled Dresden From the Right Bank of the Elbe Above the Augustus Bridge, looking in the other direction from above the Augustus Bridge. Both of the paintings are in the permanent collection of the Gemäldegalerie Alte Meister. The paintings have proved invaluable in rebuilding parts of the city that were destroyed during the World War II.

== Lists of replicas ==
Between 1751 and 1753, Bellotto also executed smaller replicas of the two paintings. There are some other replicas from his own hand.

- Dresden From the Right Bank of the Elbe Below the Augustus Bridge, ca. 1750, National Gallery of Ireland.
- Dresden From the Right Bank of the Elbe Below the Augustus Bridge, Private Collection (Madrid).
- Dresden From the Right Bank of the Elbe Below the Augustus Bridge, 1751–53, Gemäldegalerie Alte Meister.

== Gallery ==
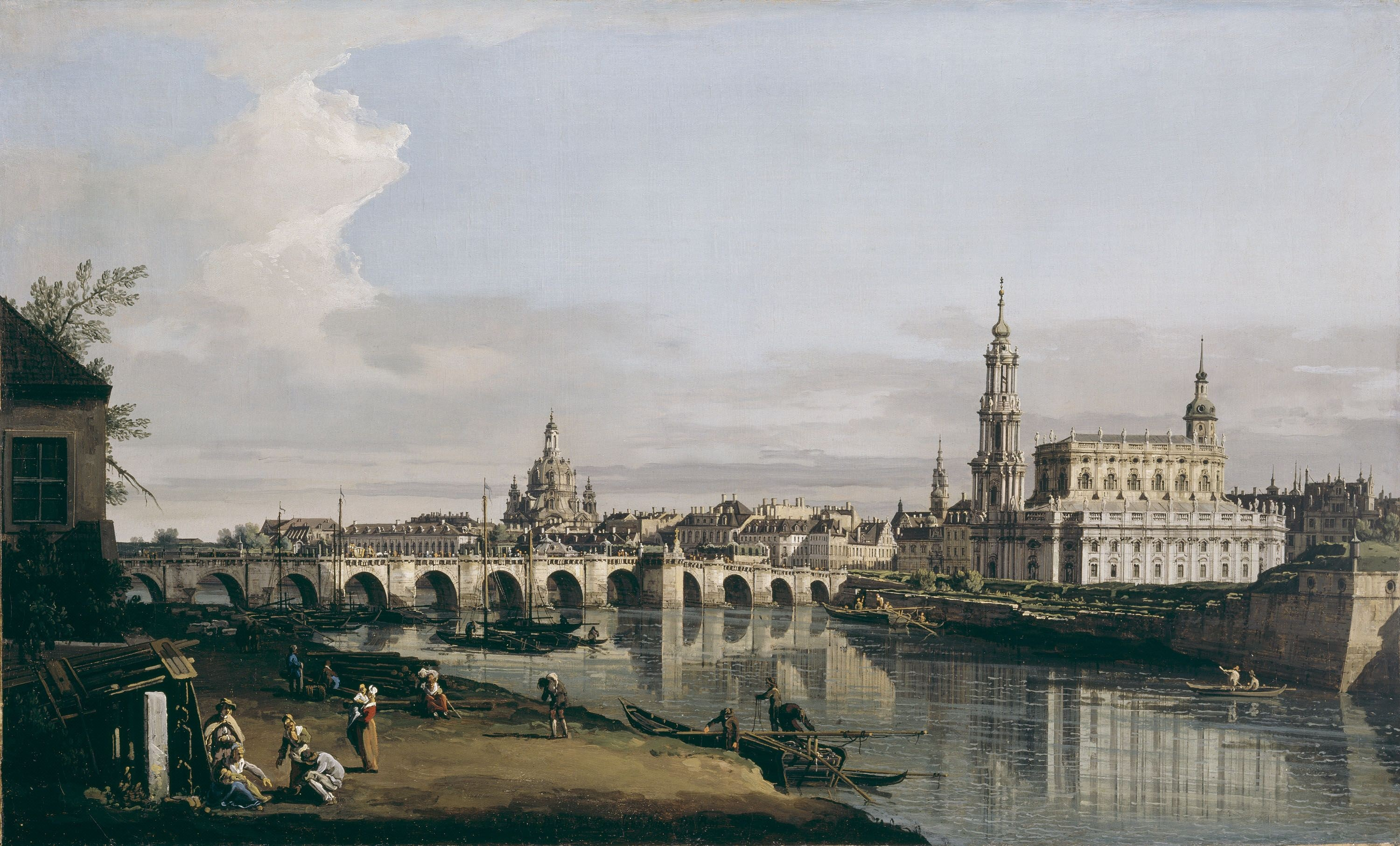
A replica from National Gallery of Ireland

== See also ==
- Canaletto Blick (Vienna)
- Bombing of Dresden in World War II
