= Helene Funke =

German painter

- Born: 3 September 1869; Chemnitz, Kingdom of Saxony
- Died: 31 July 1957 (aged 87); Vienna, Austria
- Known for: Painting
- Website: helene-funke.com

Helene Funke (3 September 1869 – 31 July 1957) was a German-Austrian painter and graphic designer of modern times.

== Life and work ==
As the daughter of an industrialist family, Funke studied painting against the will of the family from 1899 at the Munich Ladies' Academy. From 1905 and until 1913, she lived in France and then moved to Vienna until her death.

In 1918 she became a member of the artist group "movement" or "free movement" (from 1919). In addition, she was a member of the group of Viennese women's art. She was a member of the Women in the Fine Arts and Crafts, Viennese Women's Art, they rejected Impressionism, naturalism, and Art Nouveau design. In 1928 she received the Austrian State Prize for the picture Tobias and the Angel. "Their pictures often show women's groups or women's couples and represent a differentiated examination of the topic of femininity." (Geheimsache Leben, 2005)

From 1904 to 1938, she has exhibited in Munich, Berlin, Dresden, Leipzig ( BUGRA 1914) and Hamburg; she was also a member of the Deutscher Künstlerbund. In France, they had close contact with the Fauves. In Vienna, she was exhibited in the Vienna Secession, in the Société des artistes Indépendants in Paris, and at the Vienna Art Show. She was rediscovered during the last years before her death.

Still life was Funke's lifelong genre, using the medium to experiment with modernist painting techniques.

Oskar Laske immortalized her in his monumental painting "The Ship of Fools" (to be seen in the Belvedere, Vienna). In 1957, Helene Funke died in her apartment in Vienna.

Funke was then rediscovered in 1998 with a first retrospective at Gallery "Kunsthandel Hieke" by the art historian and art dealer Dr. Ursula Hieke in Vienna and then in 2007, during an extensive retrospective in Lentos, Linz. In 2018, she was exhibited in her birthplace, Chemnitz, Germany.

Her work was included in the 2019 exhibition City Of Women: Female artists in Vienna from 1900 to 1938 at the Österreichische Galerie Belvedere. It was also included in the 2023 exhibition Maestras at the Thyssen-Bornemisza and 2024 at the Arp Museum Bahnhof Rolandseck.
