= Dresden From the Right Bank of the Elbe Above the Augustus Bridge =

1747 painting by Bernardo Bellotto

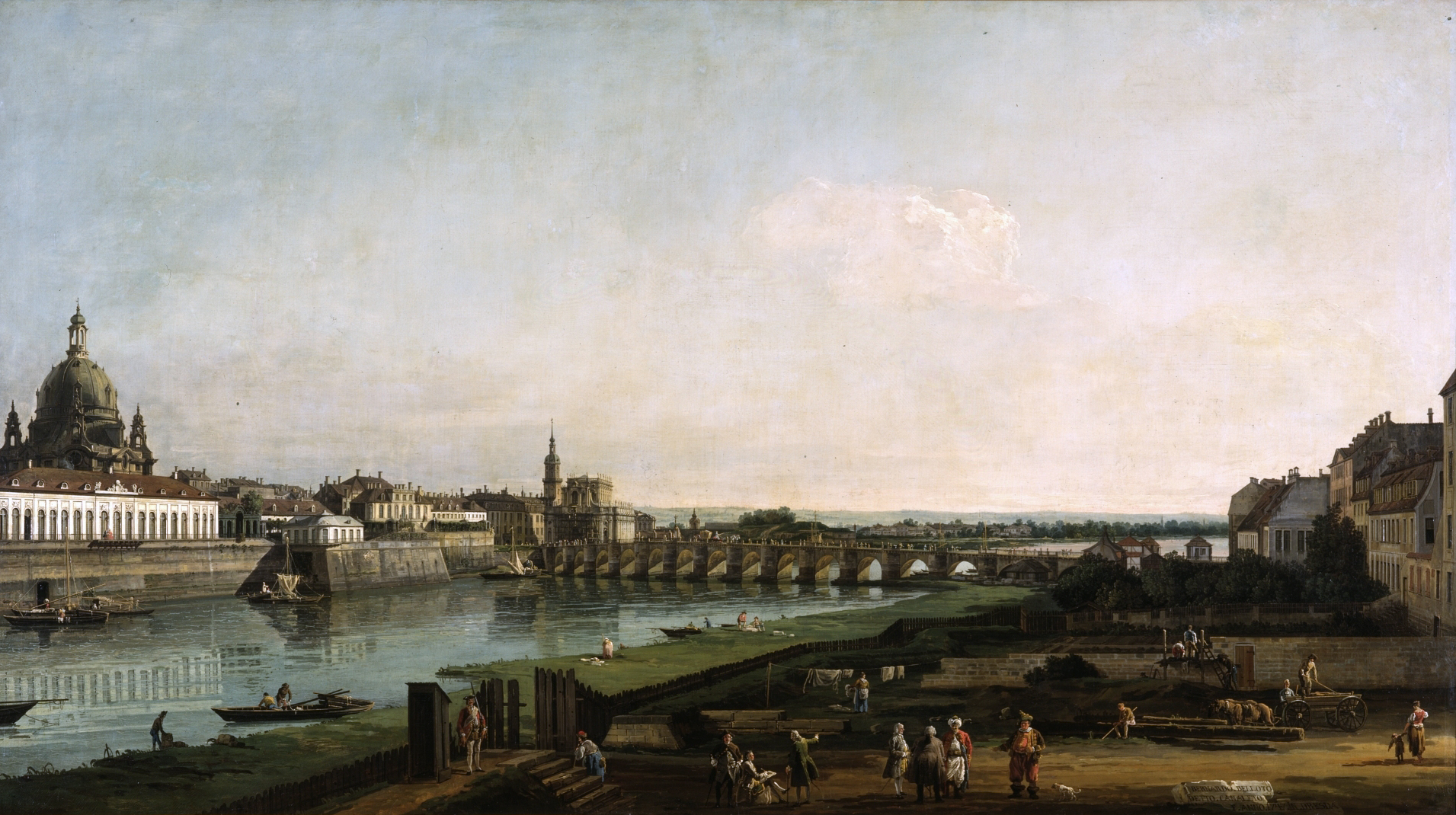
- Artist: Bernardo Bellotto
- Year: 1747
- Medium: Oil on canvas
- Dimensions: 132 cm × 236 cm (52 in × 93 in)
- Location: Gemäldegalerie Alte Meister, Dresden

Dresden From the Right Bank of the Elbe Above the Augustus Bridge is an oil on canvas by the Italian urban landscape painter Bernardo Bellotto. Painted in 1747, it depicts the view of Dresden from the right bank of the River Elbe, including the Dresden Frauenkirche, the Dresden Cathedral, and the Augustus Bridge. The foreground is a snippet of everyday life in mid-18th-century Dresden: boatmen on the Elbe, a woman hanging out the washing, goods being loaded or unloaded from a horse-drawn cart, and several men in conversation, one of whom is notably garbed in Ottoman attire.

One year later, Bellotto painted another piece titled Dresden From the Right Bank of the Elbe Below the Augustus Bridge, looking in the other direction from below the Augustus Bridge. Both of the paintings are in the permanent collection of the Gemäldegalerie Alte Meister. The paintings have proved invaluable in rebuilding parts of the city that were destroyed during World War II.

== Lists of replicas ==
Between 1751 and 1753, Bellotto also executed smaller replicas of the two paintings. There are some other replicas from his own hand.

- View of Dresden with the Frauenkirche at Left, 1747, North Carolina Museum of Art.
- Dresden From the Right Bank of the Elbe Above the Augustus Bridge, ca. 1750, National Gallery of Ireland.
- Dresden From the Right Bank of the Elbe Above the Augustus Bridge, 1751–53, Private Collection. Lent to the Getty Museum since 2016.

Also, there are some replicas from his followers, but the painting techniques are much rougher.

== Gallery ==
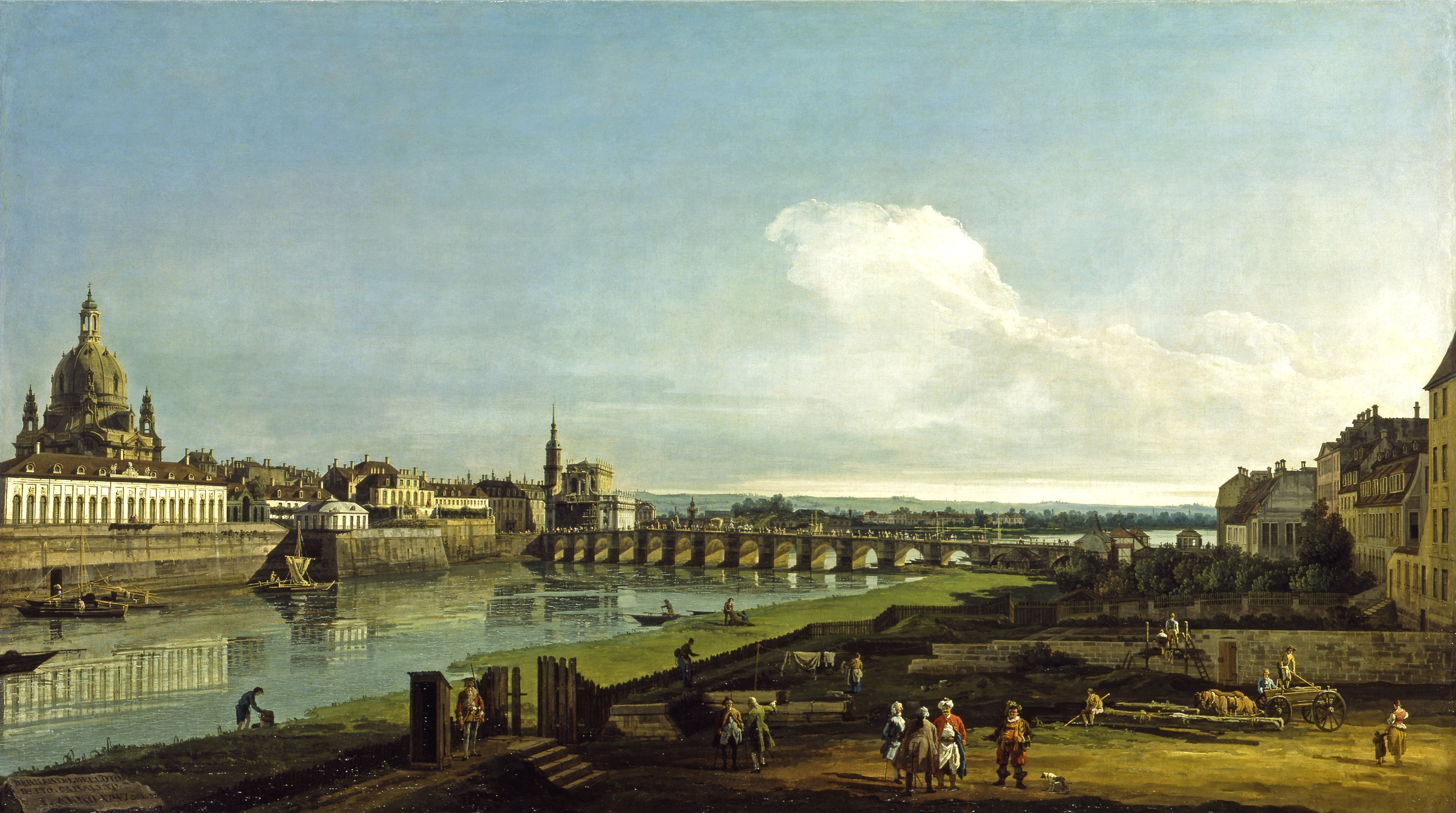
A replica from North Carolina Museum of Art

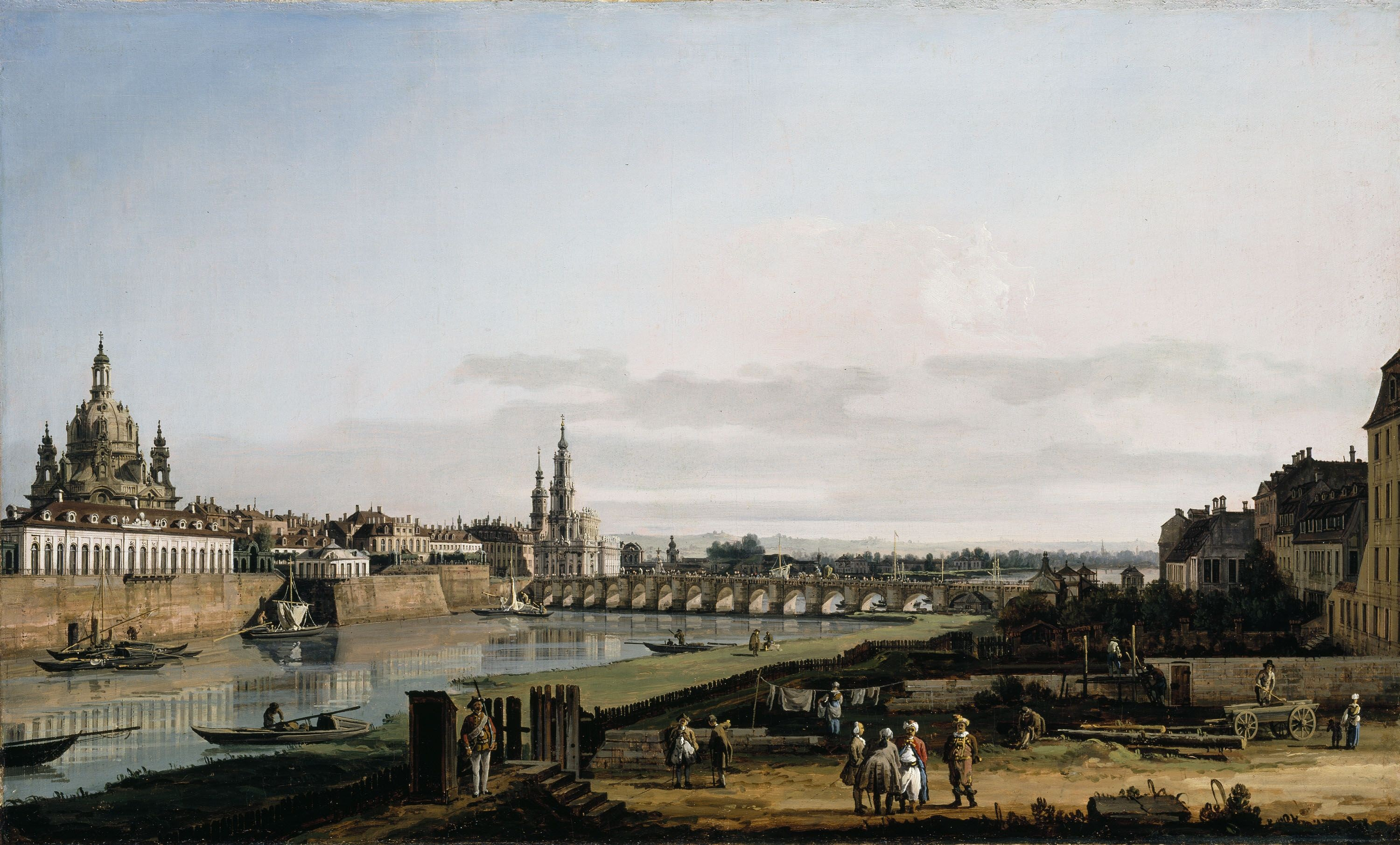
A replica from National Gallery of Ireland

== See also ==
- Bombing of Dresden in World War II
