= Elisabethinenkirche (Wien) =

Church in Vienna, Austria

Elisabethinenkirche (Church of St. Elizabeth)
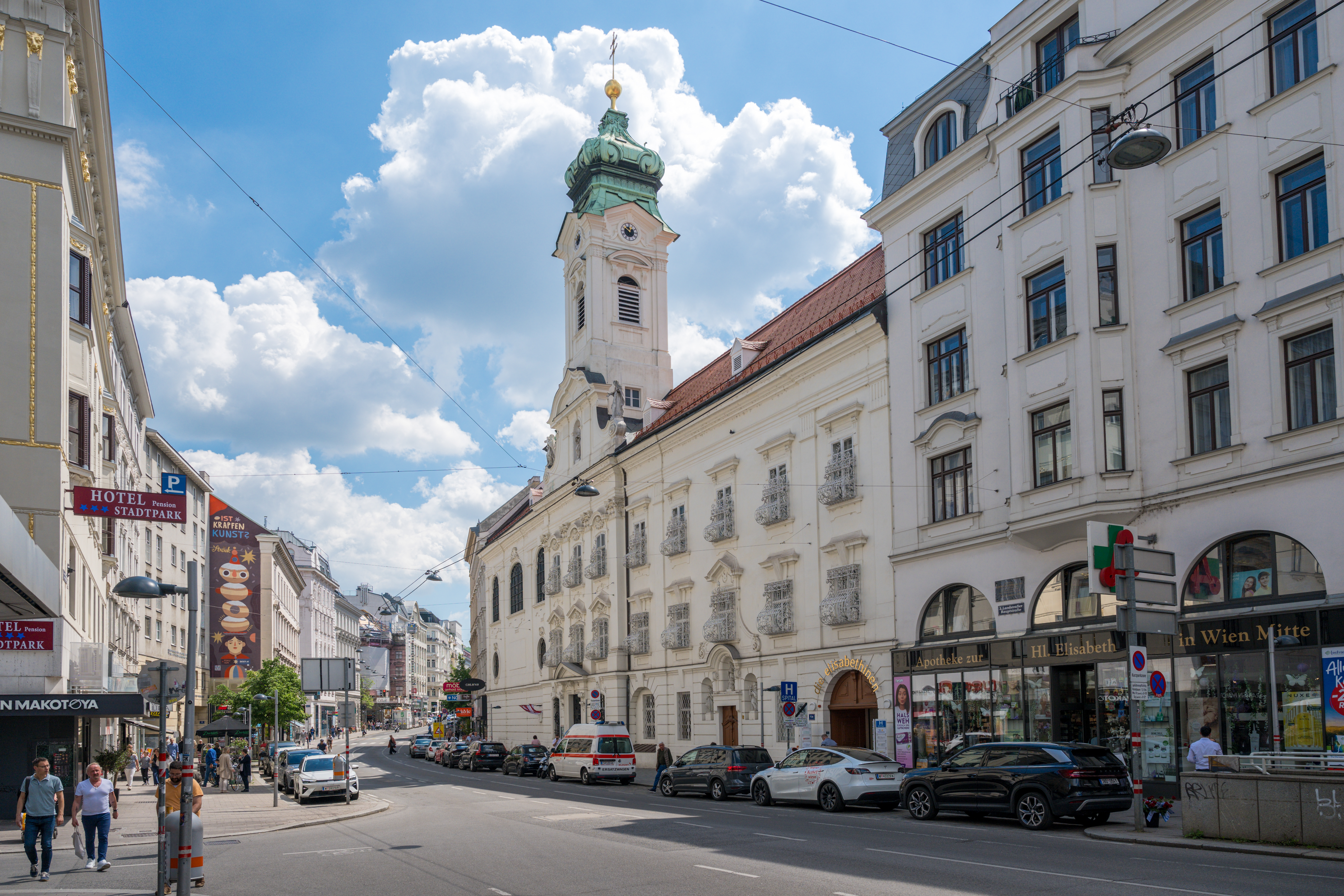

- Location within Vienna Location within Austria

Religion
- Affiliation: Roman Catholic
- Diocese: Landstraße (3. Bezirk)
- Rite: Roman Rite
- Year consecrated: 1749
- Status: Active

Location
- Location: Vienna, Austria
- Coordinates: 48°12′18.9″N 16°23′11.89″E

Architecture
- Architect: Franz Anton Pilgram
- Type: Church
- Style: Baroque
- Completed: 1748

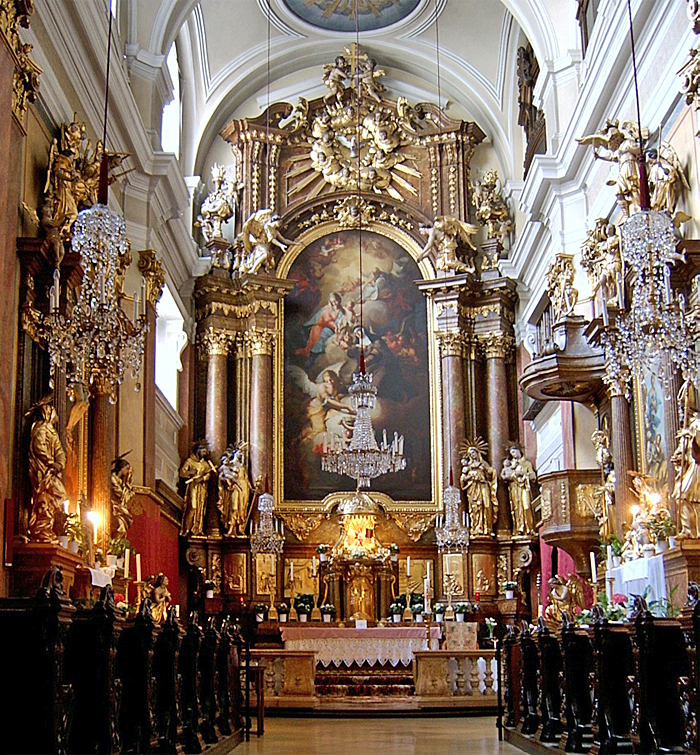
Interior view

The Elisabethinenkirche (Church of St. Elizabeth) is a convent church located next to the convent and St. Elisabeth's Hospital in the 3rd Viennese district of Landstraße at Landstraßer Hauptstraße 4a.

== History ==
In 1710, during the renovation of the Bartolotti Houses, a small wooden church was built with a donation from the imperial family and consecrated in 1711. In 1718, a hospital was built according to the plans of the master builder Franz Jänggl. After destruction by a flood in 1741, the convent was rebuilt and the church was rebuilt in 1743 by the architect Franz Anton Pilgram. The main donor was now the Prince-Primate of Hungary, Archbishop Emmerich Esterházy. The church was largely completed in 1748. The consecration took place in 1749, the same year the pharmacy was opened as a donation from Empress Maria Theresa.

== Architecture and fittings ==
The facade of the church makes the observer believe that the church is aligned at right angles to the street. In reality, the nave is parallel to the street.

The organ from 1898 was built by Johann Marcell Kauffmann and has 14 stops.

There are currently three bells in the church. Two of them hang in the church tower, the smallest hangs in the roof turret.

No.	Note	Weight (kg)	Diameter (cm)	Bellfounder	Year of casting
1	g^{1}	480	95	Josef Solonati	1748
2	c^{2}	246	74.1	Josef Pfundner	1948
3	d^{2}	105	56	Johann Achamer	1710

The large bell has round arch openings in the mantle, each containing a crucifix.

In the hospital wing, built between 1834 and 1836, by the master builder Josef Eyselt, there is a rectangular barrel-vaulted chapel with a dome and gallery in the Nazarene style.
