= Savoy Castle =

Savoy Castle may refer to:

- Savoy Castle, Ráckeve, Hungary
- Savoy Castle, Bilje, Croatia
- Savoy Castle, Gressoney-Saint-Jean, Italy

== See also ==
- Residences of the Royal House of Savoy
