= Promontor Palace =

Palace in Budapest, Hungary

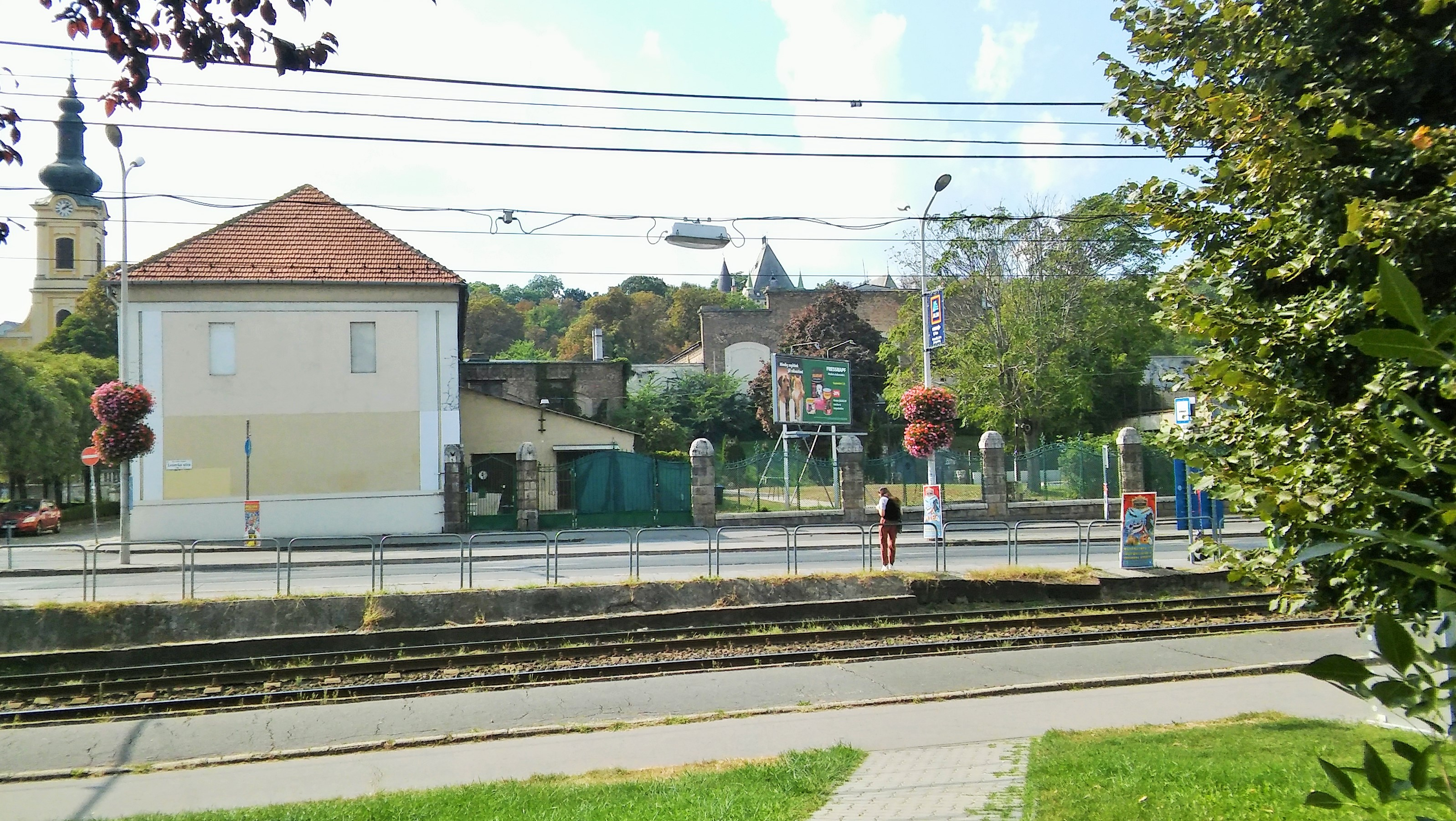
One of the remaining stable buildings of Promontor Palace with the baroque parish church in the back, the Saint Leopold III church

The Promontor palace (German: Schloss Promontor or Hungarian: Promontor Kastély) is a former baroque-style palace in Budafok, a southwestern neighbourhood of Budapest, Hungary. The quadrangular castle was built between the vineyards on the hills on the right side of the Danube river. It was commissioned by Prince Eugene of Savoy (1663–1736). The design can probably be attributed to Johann Lukas von Hildebrandt (1668–1745).

Today, only the stable buildings remain of the Promontor palace. Nothing is left from the main building, except an 18th-century plan by the architect Franz Xaver Hacker in the Hofkammerarchiv in Vienna, Austria.

== Name ==
The name Promontor derives from the Latin word promontorium, which means "headland". The village near the palace had the same name. But in 1886, the name was changed to its Hungarian equivalent, Budafok, meaning "Buda cape".

== History ==
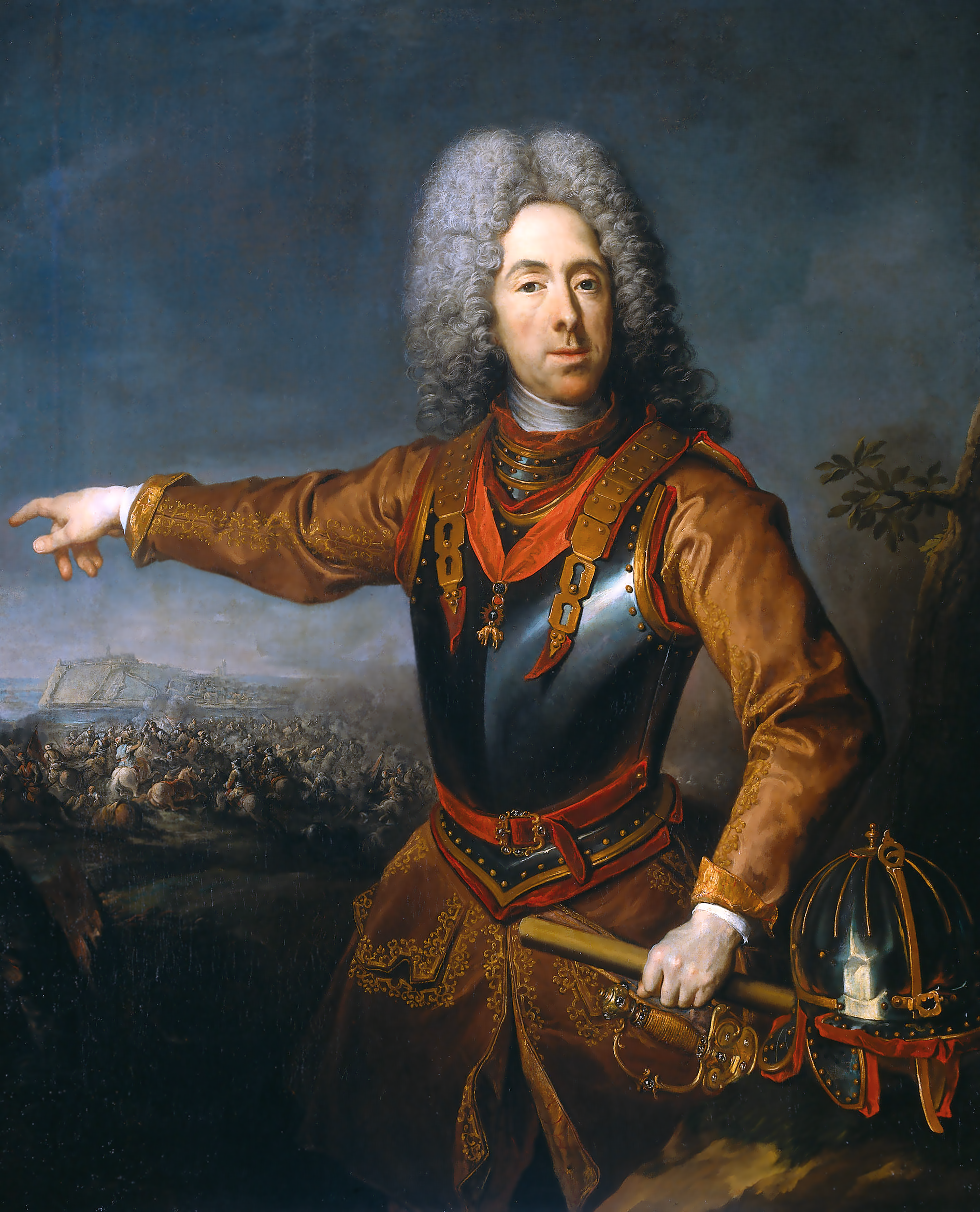
Prince Eugene of Savoye

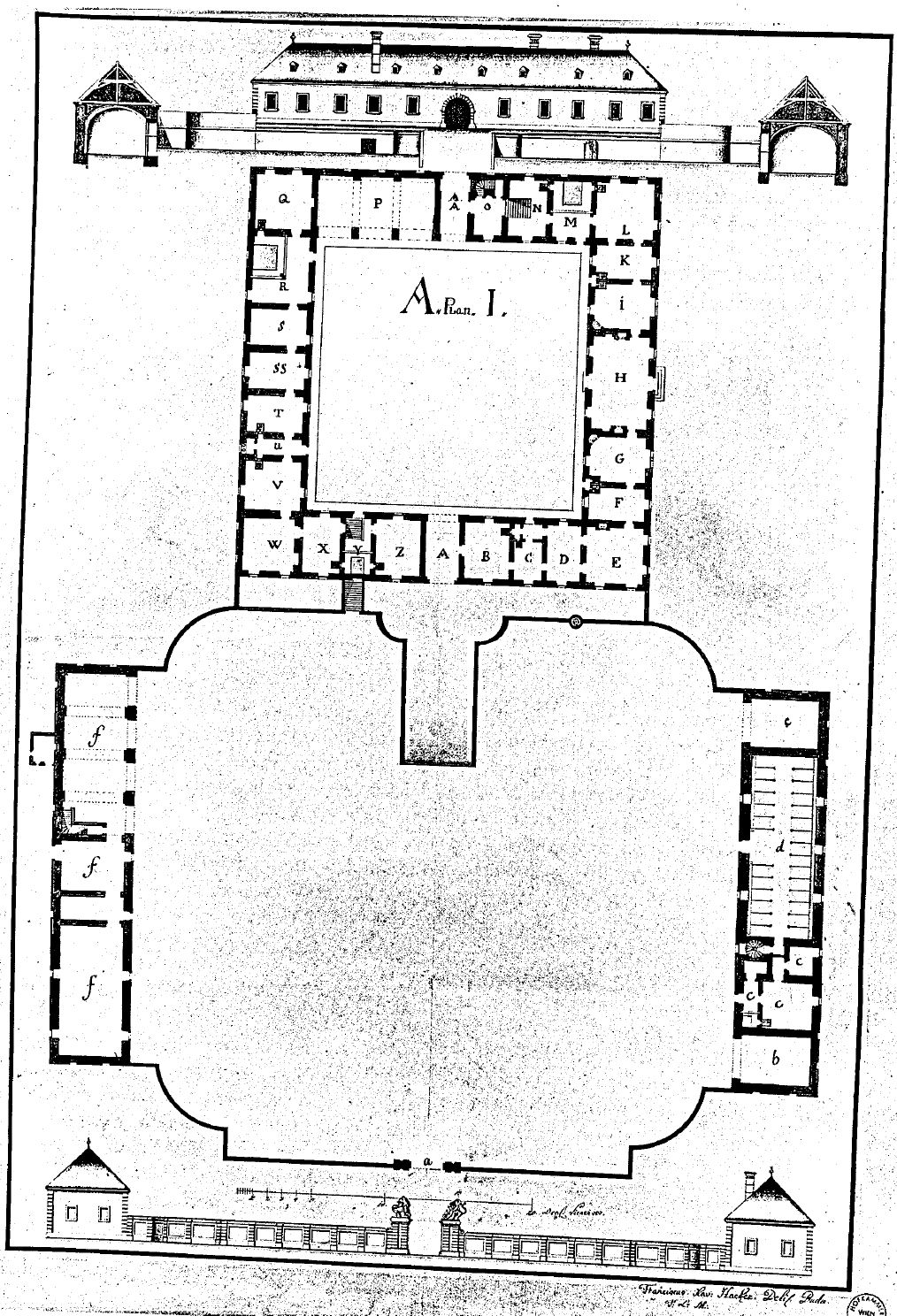
Floor plan of the Promontor Palace by Franz Xaver Hacker (1776) (Hofkammerarchiv Vienna)

At the Battle of Zenta in 1697, the Habsburg armies under Prince Eugene of Savoy defeated the armies of the Ottoman Empire under Sultan Mustafa II (1664–1703). Out of gratitude, Leopold I, Holy Roman Emperor (1640–1705) granted him estates in Hungary and Slavonia, the eastern part of Croatia. In 1698, the prince extended these domains by acquiring additional estates, such as Csepel Island and the opposite laying vineyards of Promontor.

In 1702, prince Eugene commissioned Johan Lukas von Hildebrandt to build him a summer palace in Ráckeve on Csepel Island, the so-called Savoy Castle. This palace was completed in 1714. It was a so-called maison de plaisance, a retreat for relaxation and festivities. At the same time, the prince decided to construct a palace in Promontor as well. This was meant to be the managerial heart of the surrounding princely estates.

The Promontor palace was quadrangular, and its design can probably be attributed to Hildebrandt as well, who was the favourite architect of the prince. It is probably as the private archives of the prince are lost.

The palace was approximately 60 meters wide with its courtyard measuring 40 meters, while the Danube facing forecourt was around 85 meters wide. There were stables on either side of the forecourt. Next to the palace, a catholic church was constructed as well. The northern palace wing facing the city of Budapest contained the state rooms of the prince. Adjacent to this wing was a garden.

The quadrangular plan of the Promontor palace has similarities with Prince Eugene's hunting lodge in Bilje. This lodge was also designed by Hildebrandt. The forecourt bears similarities to another work of Hildebrandt, the Palais Schwarzenberg in Vienna.

After their completion, prince Eugene did not often visit his palaces in Ráckeve and Promontor, only three times: October 1717, and June and August 1718. The prince preferred to spend his summers closer to Vienna either in the Belvedere palace or on his estates in the Marchfeld area: Schloss Hof, Schloss Niederweiden, and Schloss Obersiebenbrunn. Here he could retreat, relax and hunt, while still being close to the imperial court.

After the death of prince Eugene in 1736, his Hungarian estates passed to the Habsburg monarchs. At the start of the 20th century, the main building of the palace was demolished to make place for a sparkling wine factory. The stable buildings are still there and a gate with lions protecting the princely coats of armour.

== See also ==
Other palaces, residences and hunting lodges of prince Eugene of Savoye:

- Belvedere, Vienna
- Savoy Castle, Bilje
- Savoy Castle in Ráckeve
- Schloss Hof
- Winter Palace of Prince Eugene

== Literature ==
- Seeger, Ulrike (2001). "Zur Bautätigkeit des Prinzen Eugen auf Csepel und in Promontor". Acta Historiae Artium 42 (in German). 42: 129–141.
