= Schloss Hof =

Palace in Marchfeld, Lower Austria, Austria

Coordinates: 48°12′50″N 16°56′14″E

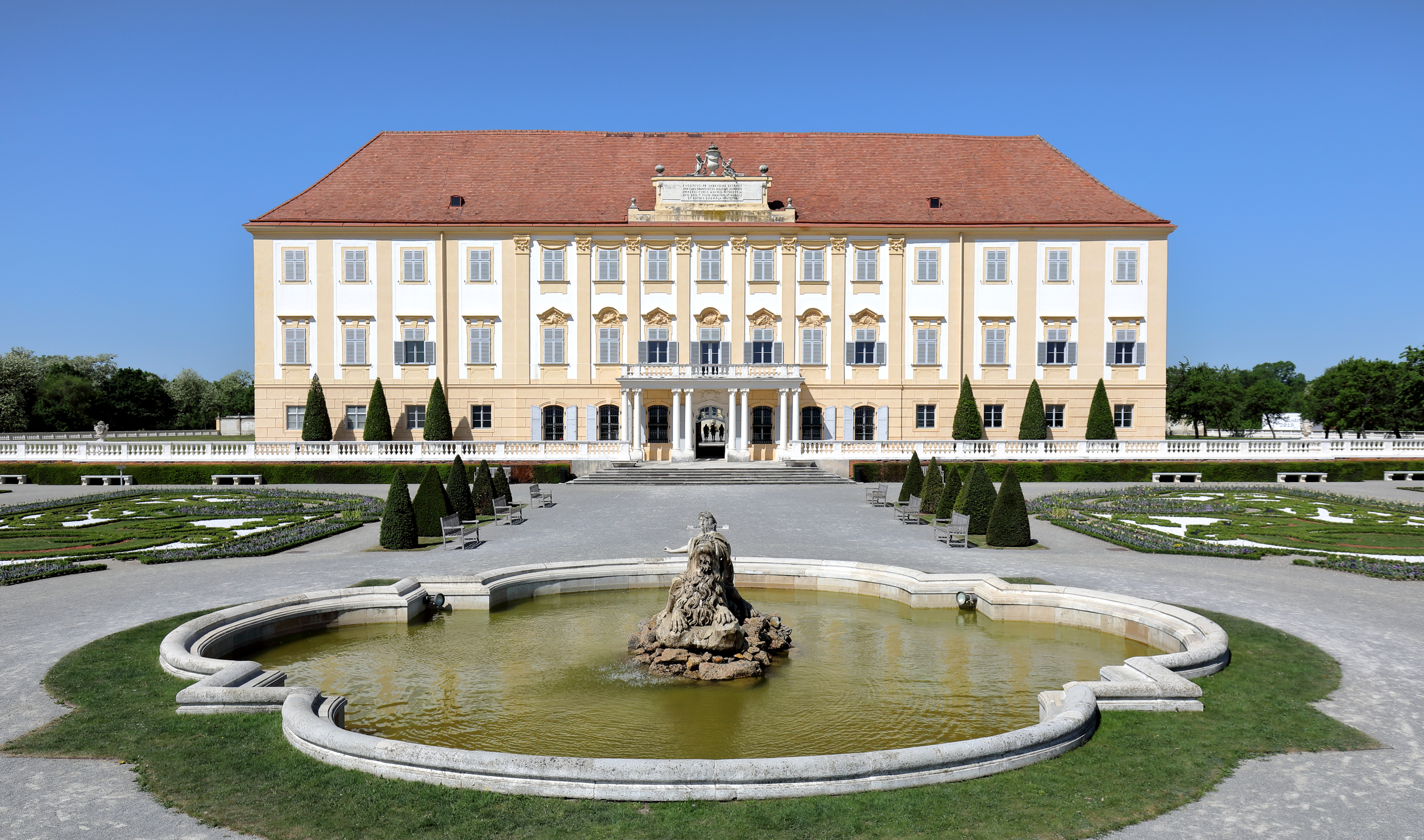
Schloss Hof

Schloss Hof is a palace located in Marchfeld, Austria near the border with Slovakia. It once belonged to Prince Eugene of Savoy who purchased it late in his life in 1726. He had it enlarged in the Baroque style by the architect Johann Lukas von Hildebrandt in 1729, and used it as an elaborate hunting lodge. He left it to a niece, Princess Maria Anna Victoria of Savoy, in his will, and it was later purchased by Empress Maria Theresa of Austria and became part of the imperial estates.

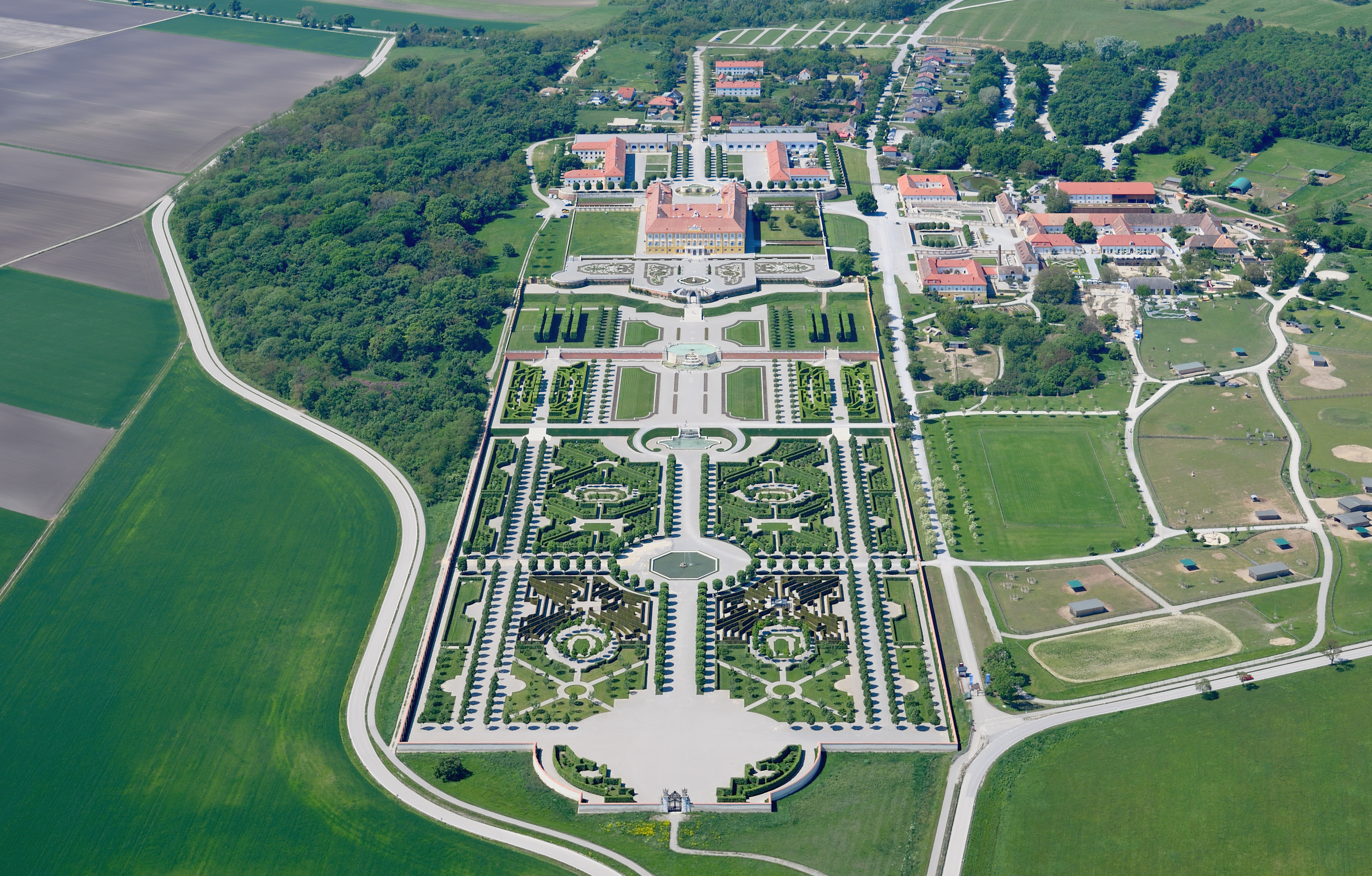
Aerial view of the Baroque gardens from the east

The castle was built in the 1620s to the east of what was then the medieval fortress of Hof. After Prince Eugene of Savoy acquired the complex in 1725, he expanded it into a representative country residence. In 1755 the castle came into the possession of Austria's sovereign Maria Theresa. From 1773 to 1775, Franz Anton Hillebrandt carried out a conversion and expansion to give it the appearance it has today.

During the First World War, the Imperial and Royal Naval Academy was moved to the castle from Fiume. By 1918 it had moved on to Braunau am Inn.

The Baroque garden was reconstructed in its historical appearance by 2019.

== The Castle of Schloss Hof Silver Coin ==
The Castle of Schloss Hof silver coin

The Castle of Schloss Hof became the main motive of one of the most famous silver collectors coins: the Castle of Schlosshof coin. This coin was issued honouring the castle with the obverse side showing a view of the castle from the terraced garden side.

== Meierhof ==
The Baroque estate, one of the largest surviving farmsteads in Europe, was restored and opened to the public. Workshops were set up in the Meierhof, through which visitors can learn about Baroque life (turning, pottery, basket-weaving, gardening, schnapps distillery). The two mirror-like orangeries adjoining the Meierhof are among the largest and also oldest (1729–30) Baroque buildings of this type in Europe. They also have the only subterranean hot-air heating system that has been preserved and has been put back into operation.

Baroque breeds of domestic animals live again today in the stables and on the pastures of the farm. Participation in breeding programs is intended to prevent the extinction of old Austrian breeds such as the Nonius horses, which were widespread in the 19th century. Lipizzaner, Noriker, spectacled sheep and camels graze on the pastures, as well as some of the last Austro-Hungarian white donkeys in the world.

== See also ==
Other palaces, residences and hunting lodges of Prince Eugene of Savoye:

- Belvedere, Vienna
- Promontor
- Savoy Castle in Ráckeve
- Savoy Castle, Bilje
- Winter Palace of Prince Eugene
