= Savoy Castle, Bilje =

Prince Eugene of Savoy's castle in Croatia designed by Johann Lukas von Hildebrandt

Coordinates: 45°36′25″N 18°44′51″E

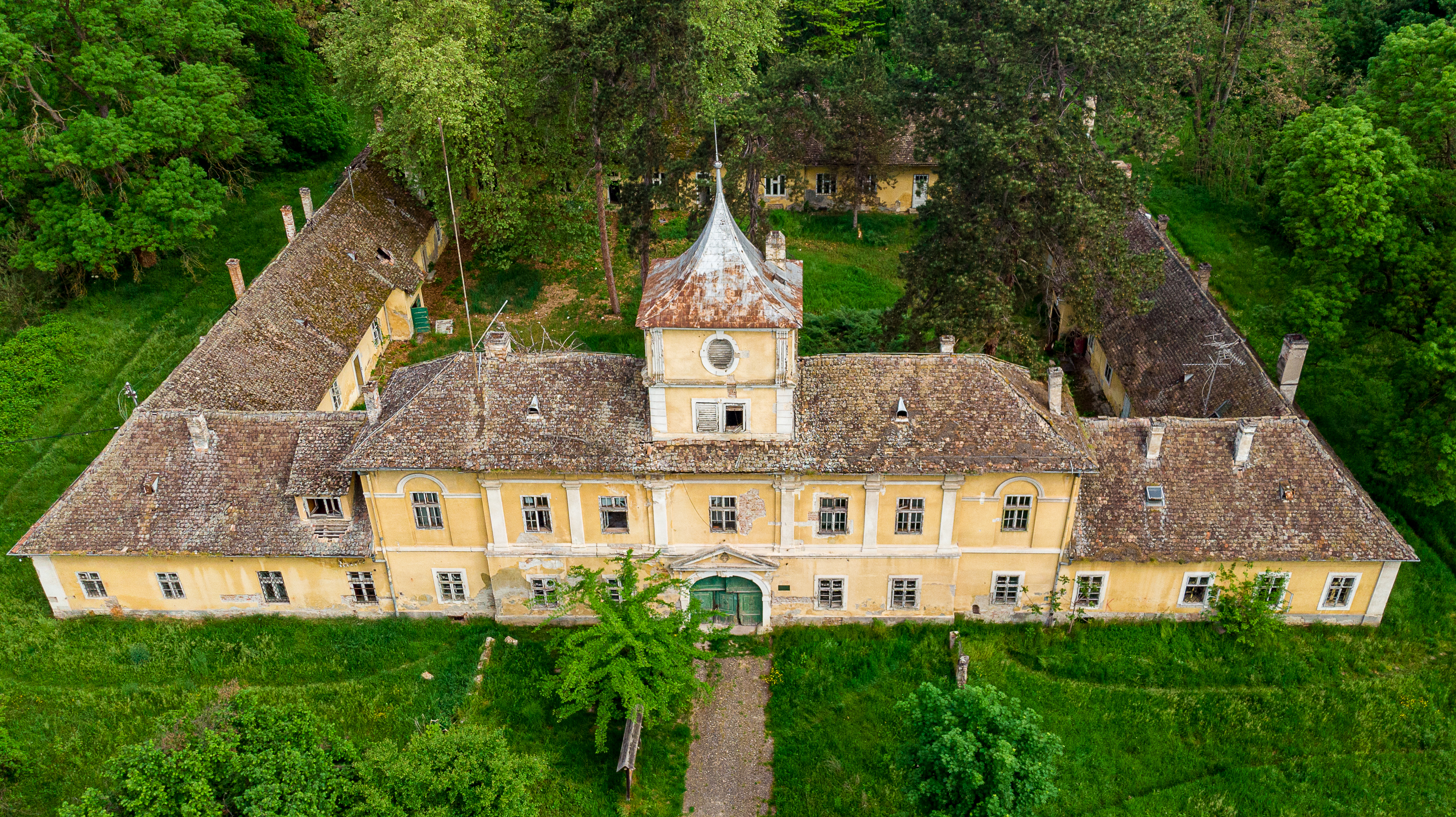
The Savoy Castle in Bilje

The Bilje castle (Croatian: Dvorac Eugena Savojskog or Hungarian: Bellye Kastély or German: Schloss Belje) is a baroque-style palace in Bilje, in the Baranja region, in north-eastern Croatia. The castle was commissioned by Prince Eugene of Savoy (1663–1736). The design of the quadrangular castle can probably be attributed to Johann Lukas von Hildebrandt (1668–1745). Afterwards, it became property of the Teschen branch of the Habsburg family. After the First World War, it was expropriated and became a state-owned agricultural estate, which it is till today.

== History ==
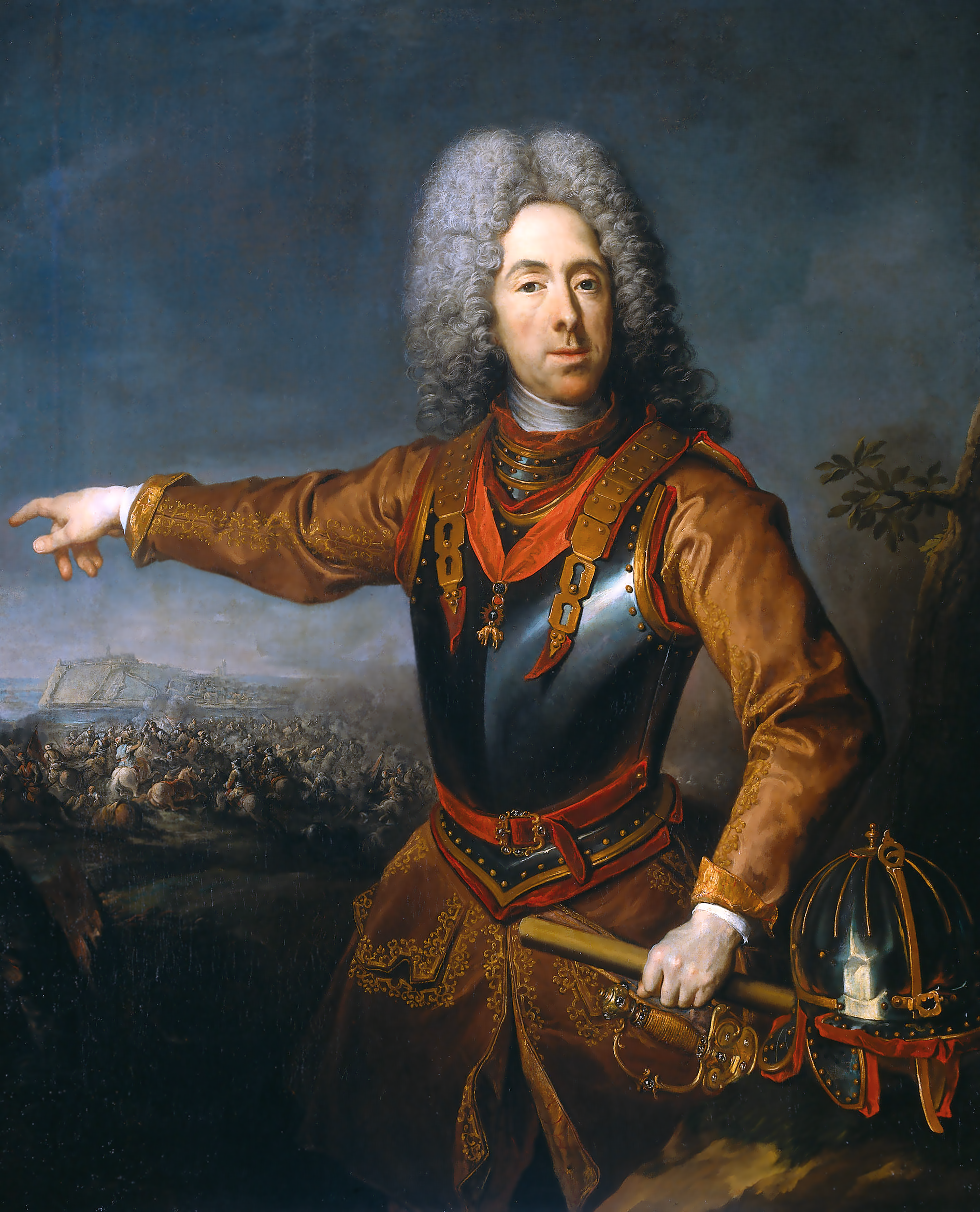
Portrait of Eugene of Savoy by Jacob van Schuppen, 1718

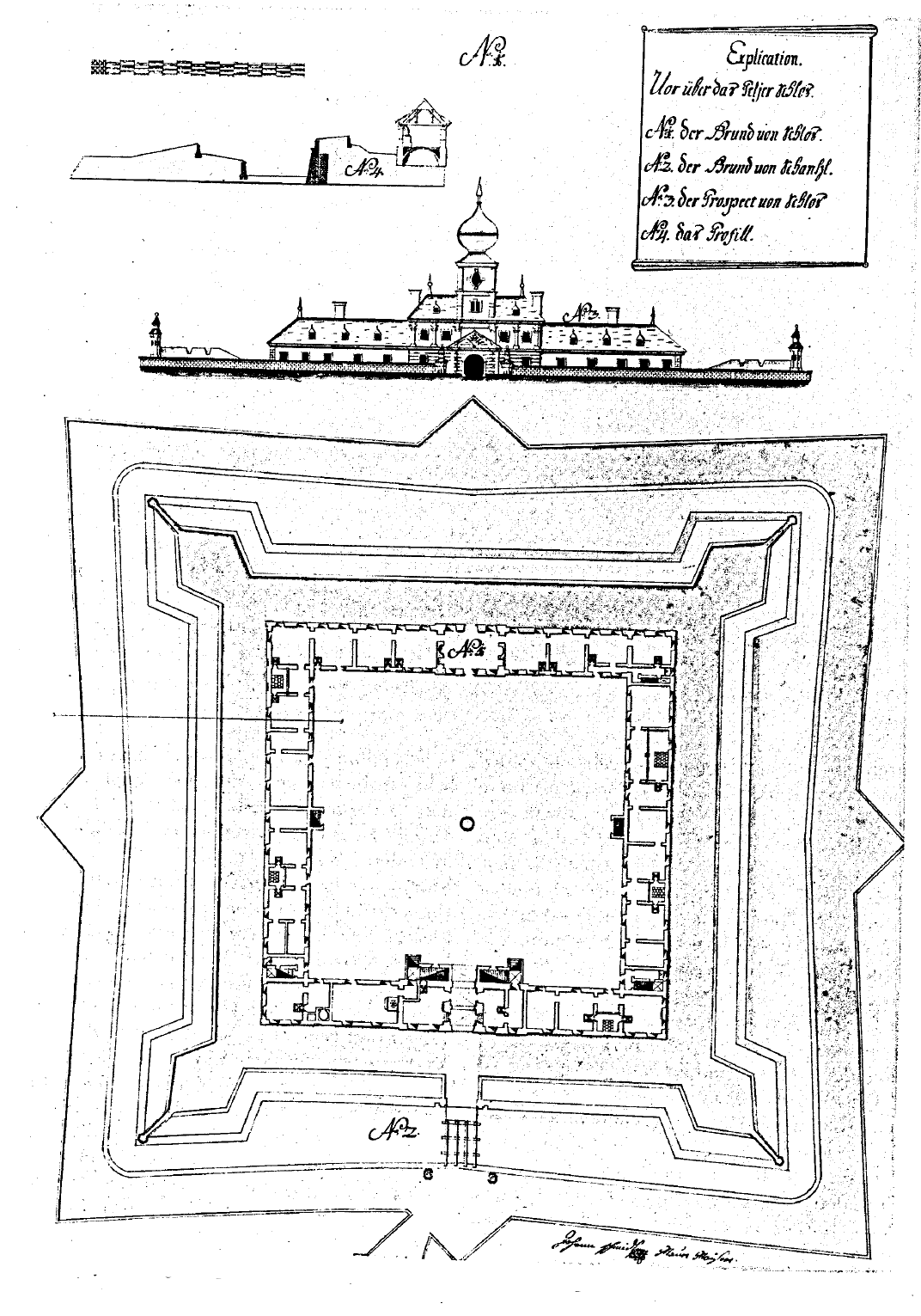
18th century floorplan of Bilje Castle

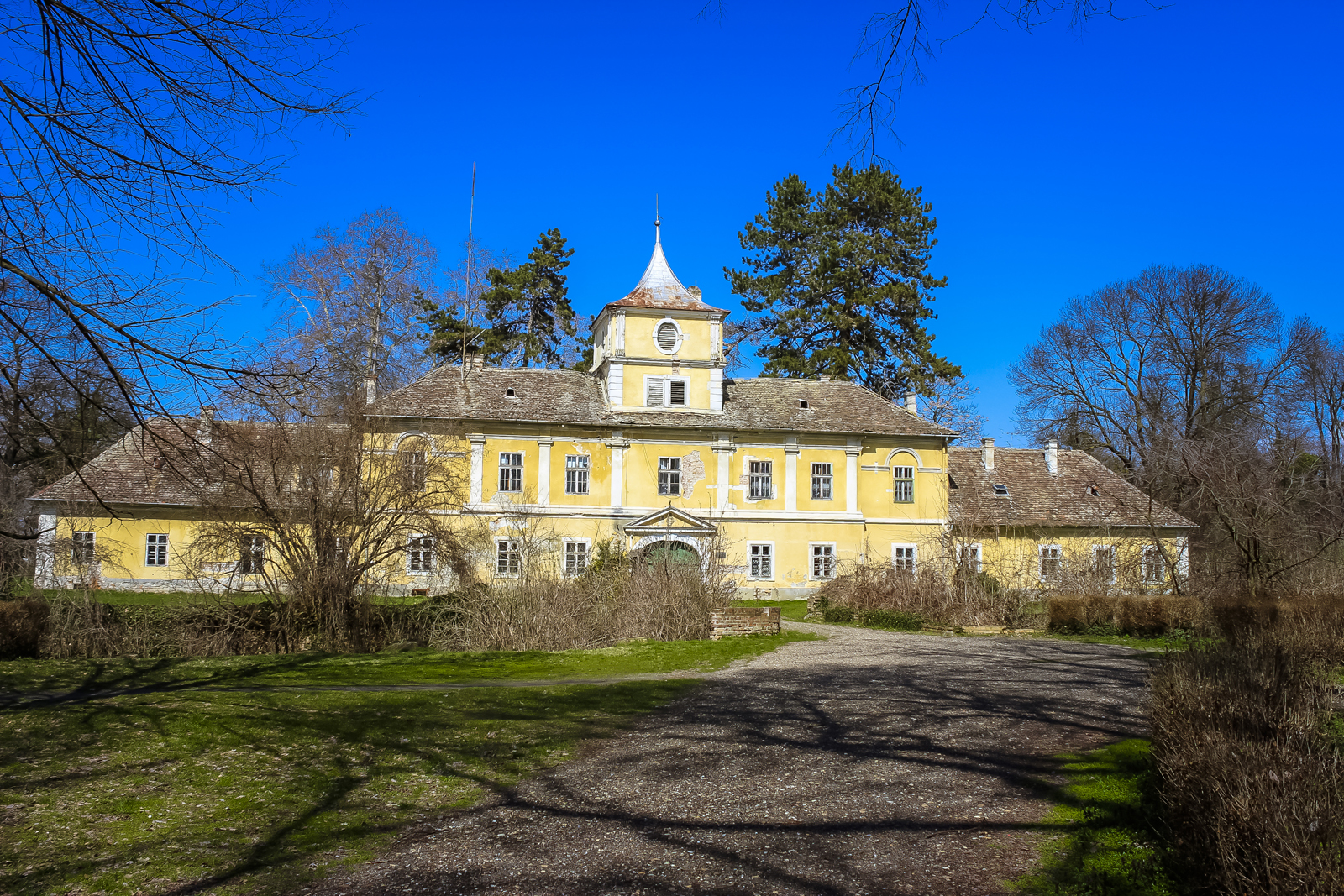
Bilje Castle

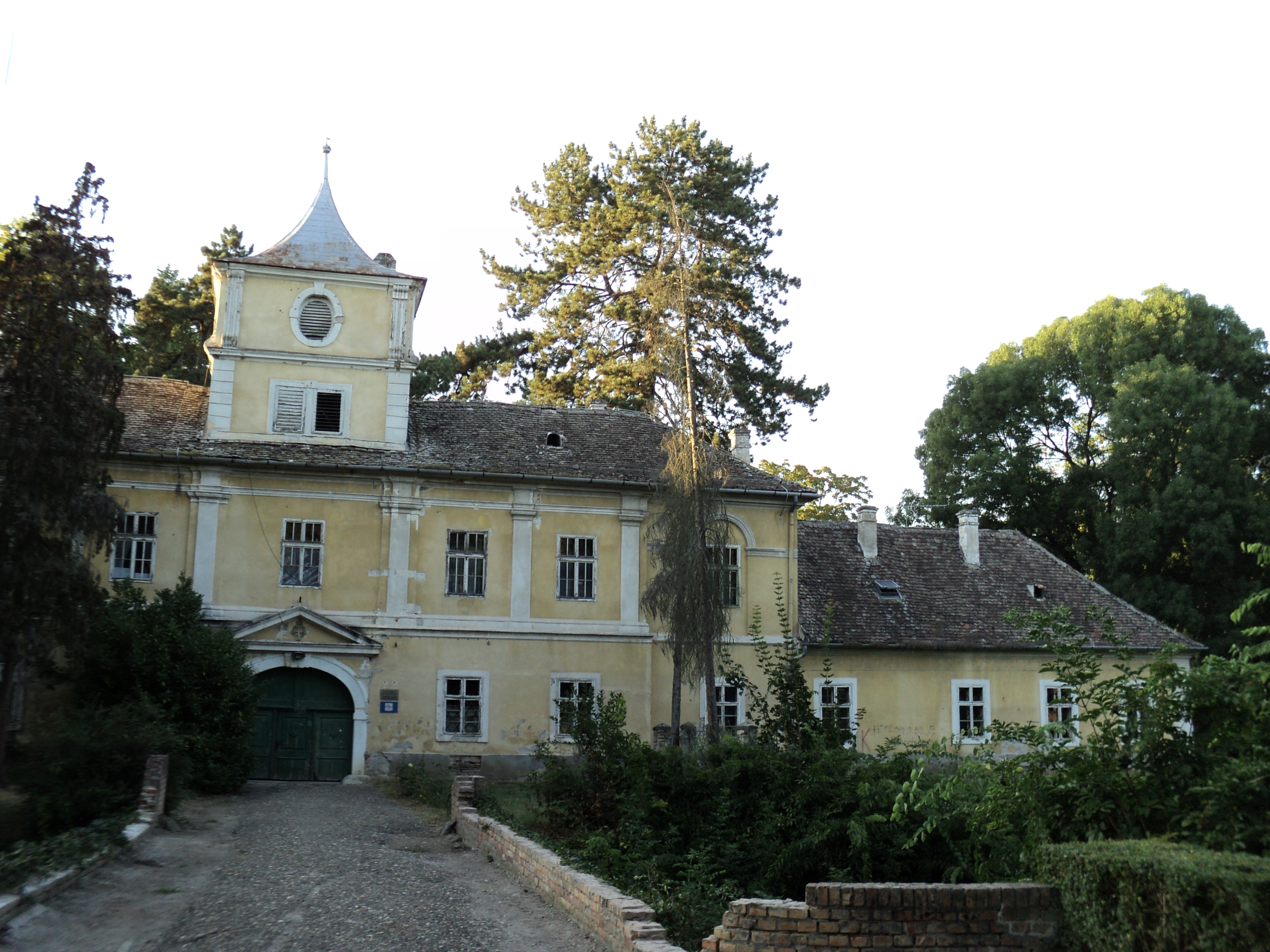
Bilje Castle

=== Prince Eugen of Savoy ===
At the Battle of Zenta in 1697, the Habsburg armies under Prince Eugene of Savoy defeated the armies of the Ottoman Empire under Sultan Mustafa II (1664–1703). Out of gratitude, Leopold I, Holy Roman Emperor (1640–1705) granted him estates in Hungary and Slavonia, the eastern part of Croatia. These Croatian estates consisted of 13 villages, 22 abandoned estates, 109,000 acres of arable land, meadows, forests, and vineyards. They were to be administered out of Bilje and were consequently named as such (the Bilje estate).

In 1707, the prince decided to build himself a hunting lodge in Bilje, the Savoy castle, which was completed in 1712. The castle's design can probably be attributed to Johann Lukas von Hildebrandt, who was the favourite architect of the prince. It is probably as the private archives of the prince are lost.

The Bilje castle is quadrangular in form. It is around 56 meters by 57 meters wide, with its courtyard measuring around 42 meters wide. Although, the castle is constructed as a hunting lodge, it is surrounded by defensive earth walls and a moat. This was not meant for defensive purposes, but probably to keep out bandit gangs and Turkish raiding parties. The quadrangular plan of Bilje castle has similarities with another castle built by prince Eugene, the Promontor palace near Budapest.

After its completion, prince Eugene did not often visit Bilje. He preferred to stay in his Vienna palace or to spend his summers either in the Belvedere palace near Vienna or on his estates in the Marchfeld area: Schloss Hof, Schloss Niederweiden, and Schloss Obersiebenbrunn. Here he could retreat, relax and hunt, while still being close to the imperial court.

Although, not often there, he was still interested in the development of the Bilje estate, and the ‘recolonization’ of the surrounding area.

After the death of prince Eugene in 1736, his Hungarian and Croatian estates passed to the Habsburg monarchs.

=== House of Habsburg-Teschen ===
In 1780, Empress Maria Theresa (1717–1780) gifted (or sold) the Bilje estate to her daughter Marie Christine of Austria (1742–1798) and her husband Albert of Saxe-Teschen (1738–1822) . The couple had married in 1766 and had received the Duchy of Teschen as well. Also, they were together appointed as Governors of the Austrian Netherlands from 1781 to 1789 and 1791–1792. After two expulsions from the Netherlands (in 1789 and 1792), they lived in Vienna, in the Albertina palace.

As the couple was childless, they had adopted their nephew, archduke Charles (1771–1847). He was the third son of Emperor Leopold II and his wife, Maria Luisa of Spain. He was also the younger brother of Francis II, Holy Roman Emperor. The archduke was epileptic, but achieved respect both as a commander and as a reformer of the Austrian army. He was considered one of Napoleon's more formidable opponents and one of the greatest generals of the French Revolutionary and Napoleonic Wars. He was the victor of the Battle of Aspern-Essling against Napoleon. In 1822, he came the heir to the Duchy of Teschen.

The main seat of archduke Charles was the Albertina palace and the Weilburg Palace, which he had constructed for his beloved wife princess Henrietta of Nassau-Weilburg (1797–1829). The Bilje estate was only used for agricultural purposes and as a hunting lodge.

Archduke Charles laid out an English landscape garden around the castle in 1824, which is still there today (around 8 hectares). The administration of the estate was moved out of the castle in 1827 to the castle in Kneževo. The Bilje castle only had residential purposes going forward.

After the death of archduke Charles, the estate was inherited by his eldest son, archduke Albrecht (1817-1895). Archduke Albrecht died, leaving no male descendants. In his will, he appointed his nephew archduke Frederick (1856–1936), the eldest son of his brother Karl Ferdinand (1818–1874), as his heir.

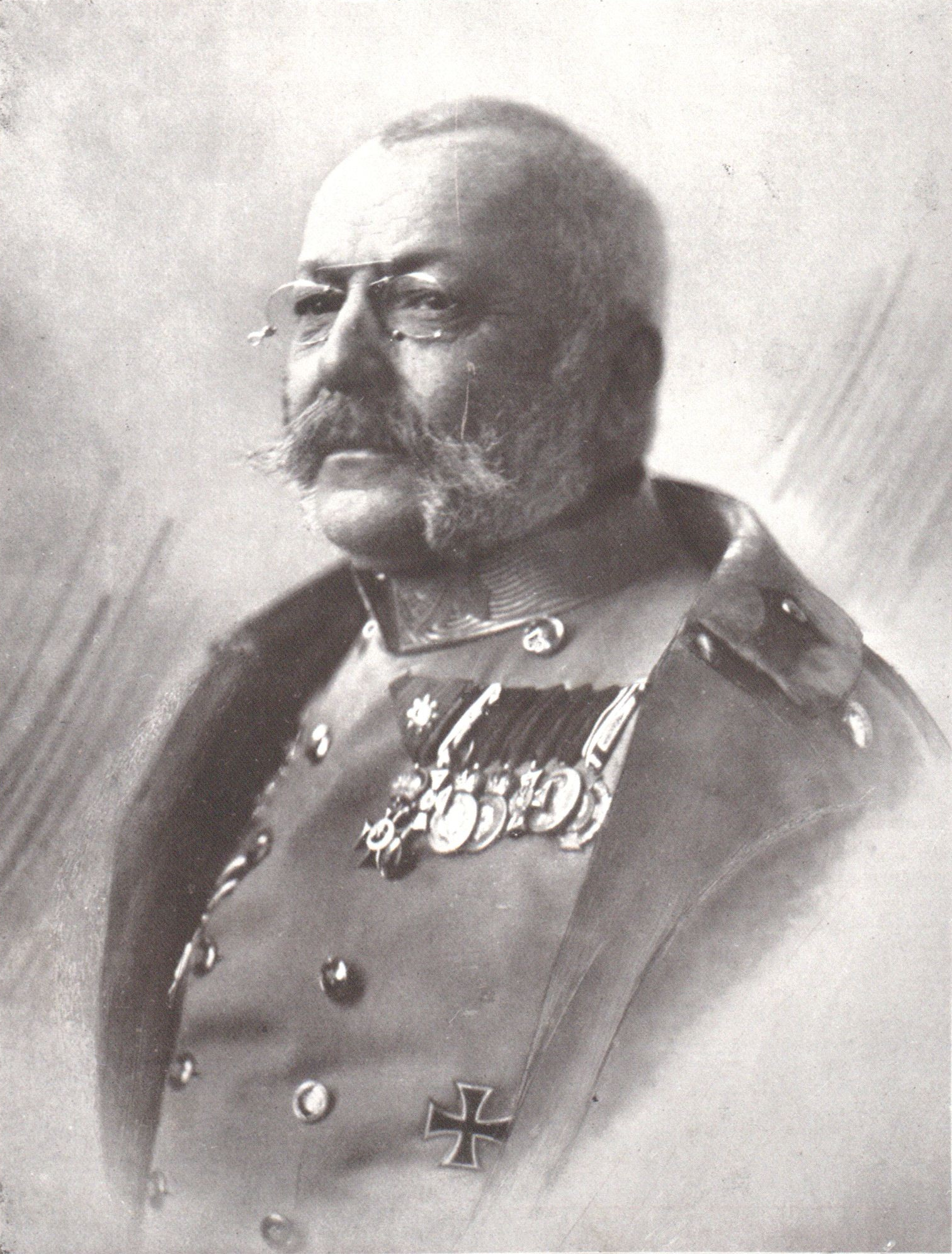
Archduke Frederick, duke of Teschen

Due to the inheritance of his uncle, archduke Frederick belonged to the wealthiest men in Austria-Hungary. Next to the Bilje estate, the Weilburg palace and the Albertina with its large art collections, he owned estates in Ungarisch-Altenburg (now Mosonmagyaróvár in Hungary), Saybusch (now Żywiec in Poland), Seelowitz (now Židlochovice) and Frýdek in the Czech Republic, and the Grassalkovich Palace in Pressburg (now Bratislava in Slovakia). He was married to princess Isabella of Croÿ (1856–1931). Together, they had nine children.

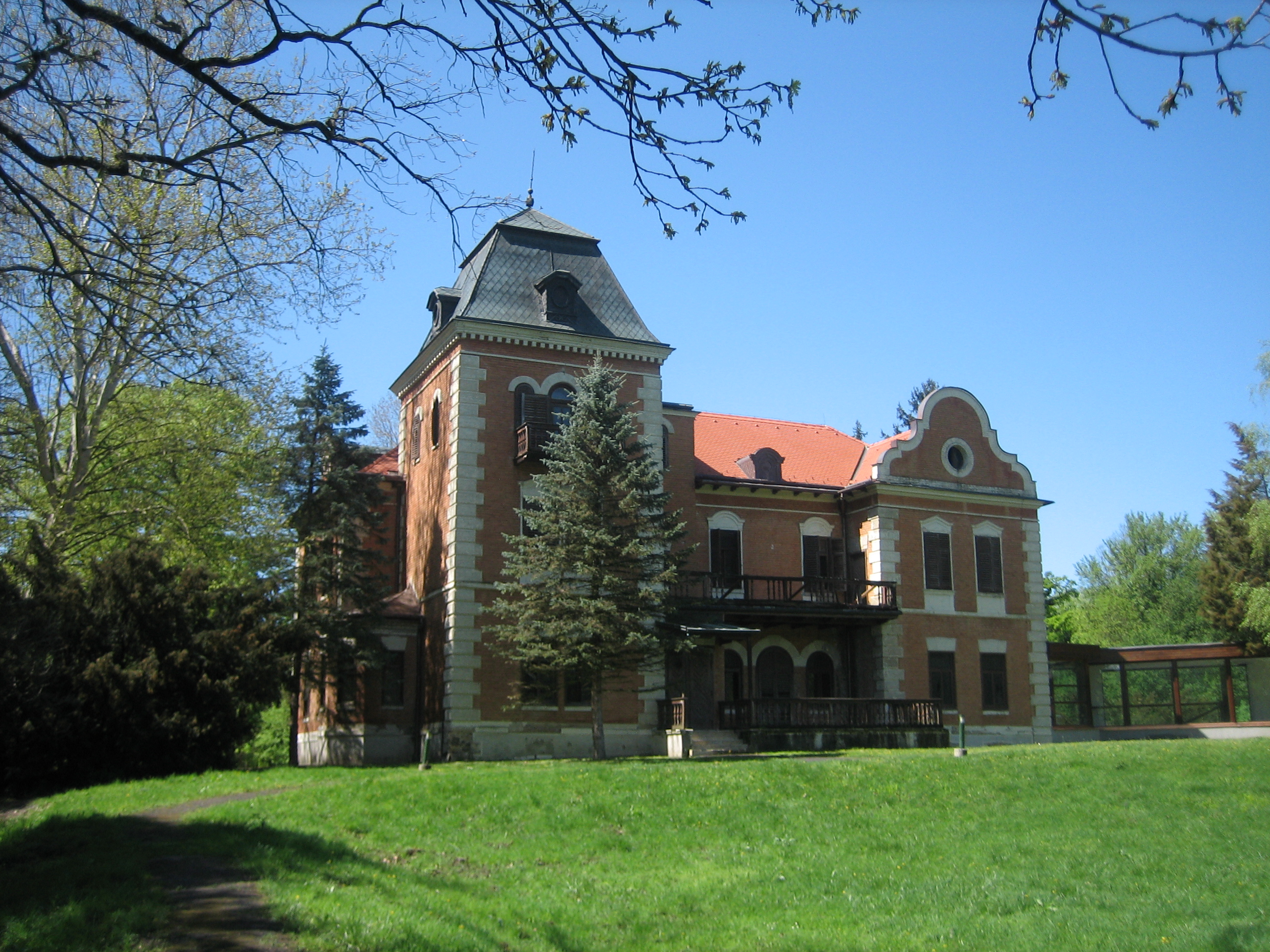
The Tikves hunting lodge at the Bilje estate

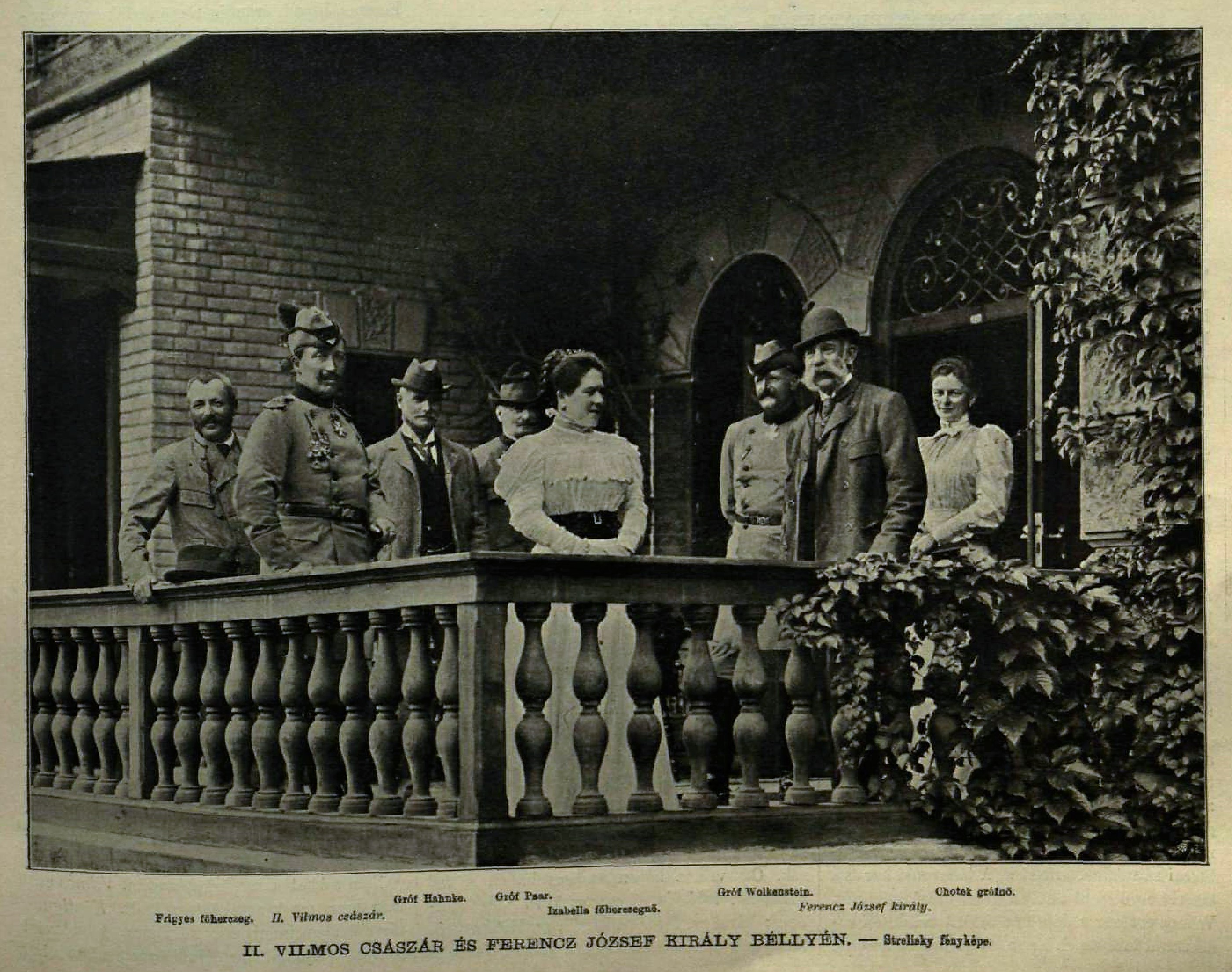
Archduke Frederick at the Tikves hunting lodge with Austrian-Hungarian emperor and king Franz Joseph I and German emperor Wilhelm II

Like most Habsburg princes, archduke Frederick adopted a military career, and served creditably for many years. At the start of the First World War, he was appointed by Emperor Franz Joseph I (1830–1916) as the supreme commander of the Austro-Hungarian Army. The archduke thought it his duty to accept this heavy responsibility, but, modestly underestimating his own powers, left the actual exercise of the command to his chief of staff, Franz Conrad von Hötzendorf. In the performance of ceremonial duties, and as mediator for the settlement of the conflicting demands of the military, civil and allied elements, his services were undeniable. He was promoted to the rank of Generalfeldmarschall on 8 December 1914. In February 1917, emperor Charles I (1887–1922) himself took over the supreme command. The archduke, although the Emperor's representative, no longer appeared in the foreground, and devoted himself to the management of his estates.

Under the administration of the Teschen brand of the Habsburg family, the Bilje estate became one of the biggest manors in Europe. This was partly due to the natural resources of the property, e.g. good soil, climate and a favourable geographical position. The archducal family visited the estate from time to time for hunting trips. They often invited other royal guests to join them, such as emperor Franz Joseph I of Austria (1830–1916) or German emperor Wilhelm II (1859–1941). They also constructed a second hunting lodge on the estate, the Tikves hunting lodge.

=== State-owned ===
The Bilje estate remained in Habsburg hands until 1918, when the Serbian army and its allies entered the Baranja region. After the end of the First World War, the Bilje estate was split: around 78 percent of its territory, including Bilje castle, was in the newly formed Kingdom of Yugoslavia, while the remaining 22 percent was in Hungary. Basis the Treaty of Saint-Germain in 1919, all the property of the Habsburg family was to be expropriated, which happened in Yugoslavia, while in Hungary, it remained in the hands of the Habsburg-Teschen family.

Archduke Frederick disputed the expropriation and sued the State of Yugoslavia, but was not successful. Bilje castle and its remaining estate became state-owned property, and continued operating as such till today (first Yugoslavian, later Croatian).

During the Second World War, the Hungarian Army occupied the Baranja region, and the estate was (temporarily) returned to Frederick's son archduke Albrecht Franz (1897–1955) . But after the end of the war, it was expropriated again.

In 1974, the castle was fully renovated, and housed a state-owned hunting department. In January 2018, the Croatian state handed over the ownership of the castle to the Bilje municipality, which then included the castle in its tourist plans.

=== Modern times ===
Today, Bilje castle and its surrounding park are in extremely poor condition and deteriorating. The castle houses small exhibition devoted to prince Eugene.

== See also ==
Other palaces, residences and hunting lodges of Prince Eugene of Savoye:

- Belvedere, Vienna
- Promontor
- Savoy Castle, Ráckeve
- Schloss Hof
- Winter Palace of Prince Eugene

== Literature ==
- Scitaroci, Mladen; Scitaroci, Bojana (2000). "Bilje/Belje (Béllye) Schloss des Prinzen Eugen von Savoyen". Slawoniens Schlösser von Zagreb bis Vukovar (in German). Graz, Stuttgart: Leopold Stocker Verlag. pp. 74–79. ISBN 3-7020-0899-3.
- Seeger, Ulrike (2001). "Zur Bautätigkeit des Prinzen Eugen auf Csepel und in Promontor". Acta Historiae Artium 42 (in German). 42: 129–141.
- Peres, Zsuzsanna; Gardas, Miro; Roskar, Jelena (2013). "Manors in Baranja County in the 18th and 19th centuries". In Drinóczi, Tímea; Zupan, Mirela (eds.). Law – Regions – Development Hungary-Croatia IPA Cross-border Co-operation Programme. Pécs, Osijek: Faculty of Law University of Pécs, Faculty of Law J.J. Strossmayer University of Osijek. pp. 255–276. ISBN 978-953-6072-76-7.
