= Savoy Castle, Ráckeve =

18th-century Baroque style château located in Ráckeve, Hungary

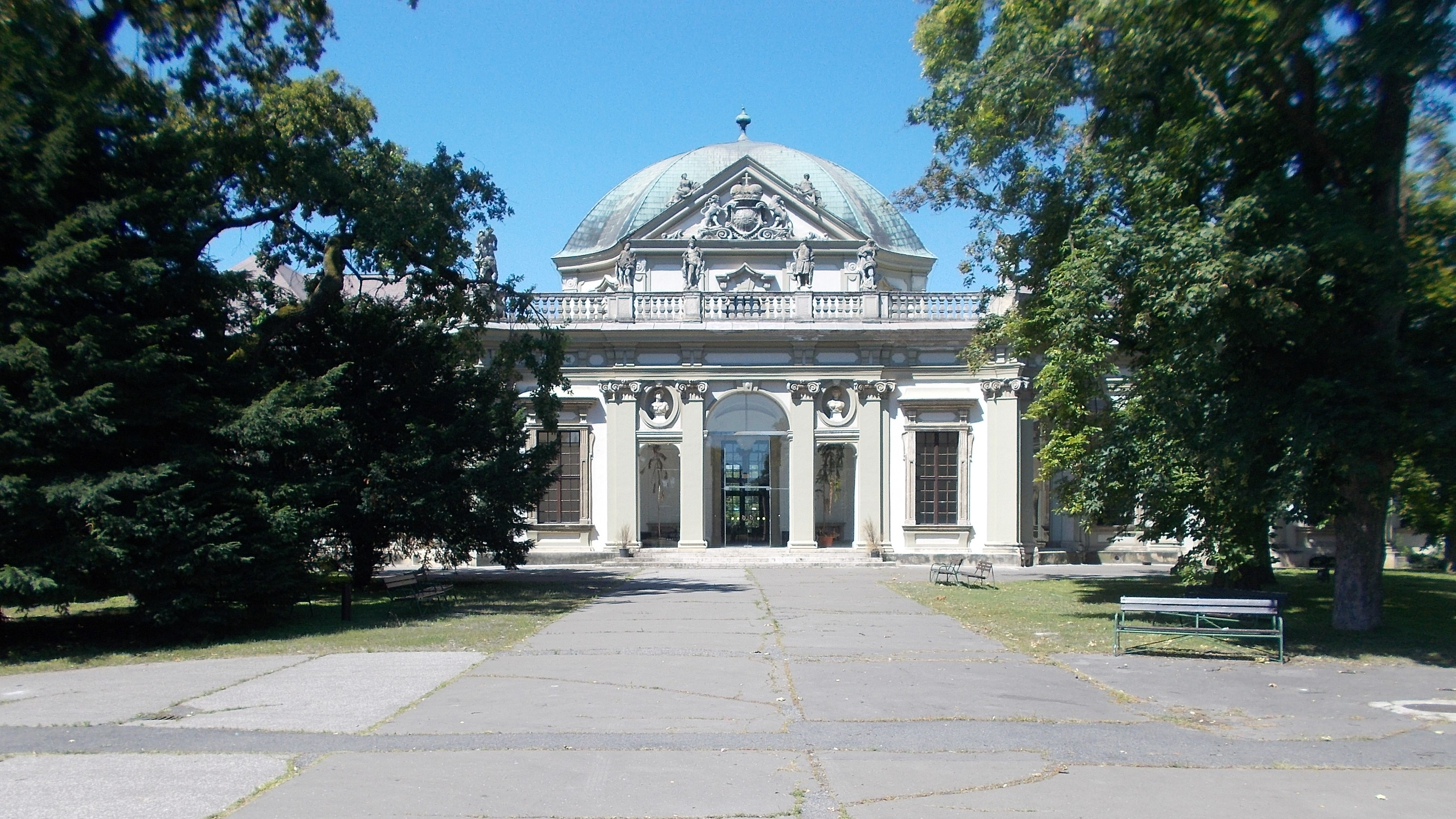
Front entrance

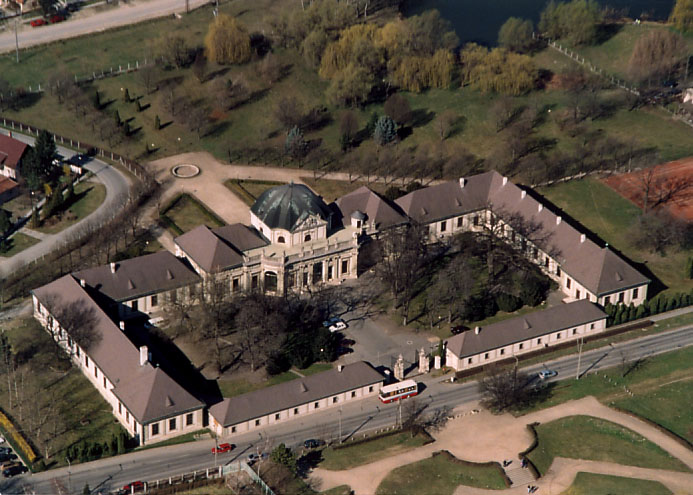
Aerial view of the property

Savoy Castle, also known as Savoy Mansion (Hungarian: Savoyai Kastély), is an 18th-century Baroque style château located in Ráckeve, Hungary. This property is currently being used as a hotel and restaurant, and its reception halls can also be rented for special events.

== History ==
Construction of the spacious home was begun in 1702 at the commissioning of Prince Eugene of Savoy and finished in approximately 1722. Prince Eugene had acquired Csepel Island in 1698, and he then began the planning process of this "maison de plaisance".

Prince Eugene commissioned Johann Lucas von Hildebrandt, a student of the Roman Carlo Fontana, to design this residence. Seven letters from Hildebrandt to the prince remain in the archives of the Gonzaga family in Mantua, and they provide planning and construction information about the mansion.

The building has side wings which were completed in 1714, and the whole construction process was finished around 1720 to 1722. At the same time, the prince constructed another palace as well in the vicinity, the Promontor palace on the opposite bank of the Danube.

The prince did not reside in this mansion after it was finished, and following his death, the estate was appropriated by the Crown.

Under the reign of Maria Theresia of Austria, this residence and the adjoining land in Csepel were managed by the Hungarian Chancery. In 1814, the middle part of the mansion, along with the stately Baroque cupola, was destroyed by fire; what is seen today was rebuilt after the fire.

Until its reconstruction in the 1980s, the building suffered constant decline. The mansion has enjoyed renovation and revitalization, and it is now used as a hotel, which is called the Savoyai Mansion Hotel (Hungarian: Savoyai Kastélyszálló).

== See also ==
- List of castles in Hungary
- Palaces and mansions in Hungary

Other palaces, residences and hunting lodges of Prince Eugene of Savoye:

- Belvedere, Vienna
- Promontor
- Savoy Castle, Bilje
- Schloss Hof
- Winter Palace of Prince Eugene
