= Winter Palace of Prince Eugene =

Austrian palace by J.B. Fischer von Erlach

- Winterpalais Prinz Eugen (German); Stadtpalais (German)
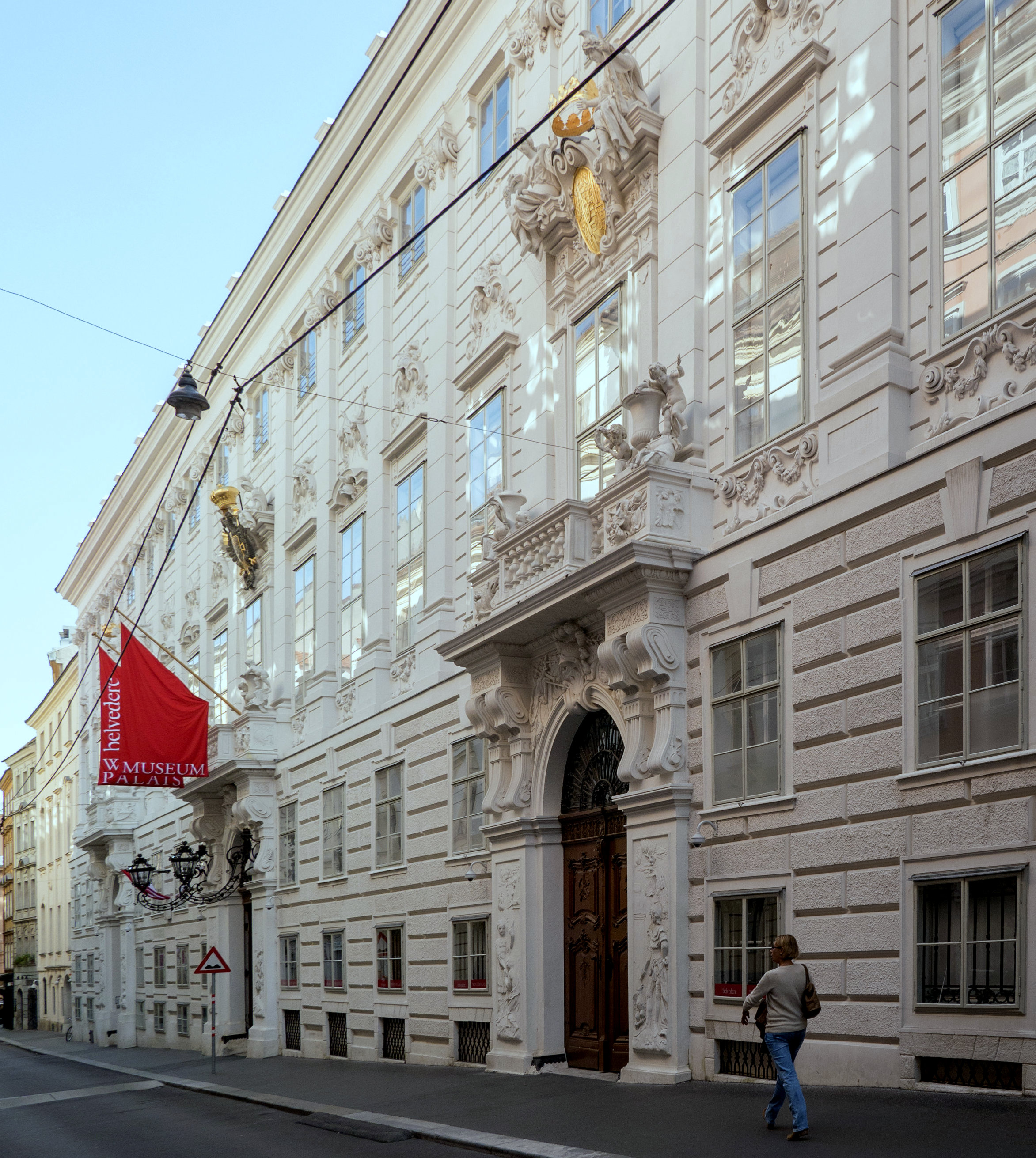

- Location within Vienna
- 48°12′20″N 16°22′22″E
- Location: Innere Stadt, Vienna, Austria

History
- Built: 1695-1724
- Built for: Prince Eugene of Savoy

Site notes
- Architect(s): Johann Bernhard Fischer von Erlach and Johann Lukas von Hildebrandt
- Architectural style: high-Baroque

The Winter Palace of Prince Eugene (German: Winterpalais Prinz Eugen), also known as the City Palace (German: Stadtpalais), is a high-Baroque palace in the Innere Stadt district of Vienna, Austria. Located on a narrow street at Himmelpfortgasse 8, the palace was used as the winter residence of Prince Eugene of Savoy, who spent his summers at the Belvedere. The Winter Palace was designed and constructed by Johann Bernhard Fischer von Erlach from 1695 to 1700, and by Johann Lukas von Hildebrandt from 1702 to 1724 following his predecessor's plans.

The palace was acquired through auction by Empress Maria Theresa for the imperial court in 1738, along with most of the prince's other buildings. In 1752, the palace was converted by Nicolò Pacassi into the seat of various state institutions. The palace housed the finance ministry of the Austrian Empire from 1848 to 1918 and the dissolution of the Habsburg Empire. Since 1919, the palace has housed the Ministry of Finance. From 2007 to 2013, the palace was extensively renovated. The Winter Palace of Prince Eugene is considered "one of the most magnificent Baroque edifices in Vienna".

== History ==
In 1694 and 1695, Prince Eugene of Savoy purchased several old houses on Himmelpfortgasse in Vienna, including an early Baroque theater. In 1695, Johann Bernhard Fischer von Erlach won the prestigious and lucrative contract to build a palace at this location for the prince. In 1697, Fischer von Erlach began constructing the seven-bay palace, and by 1698, painters were already working on the ceiling frescoes. Fischer von Erlach's construction manager was Andrea Simone Carove. The stonemasonry was done by the Viennese master Johann Thomas Schilck. The large portal with side reliefs—Hercules fighting the giant Antaeus on the left, and Aeneas saving his father from burning Troy on the right—was sculpted from Kaiserstein by Lorenzo Mattielli. During this first phase of construction, the remarkable staircase with Kaiserstein steps and the Atlas figures were completed. The sculptures from Zogelsdorfer stone in the stairway were executed by Giovanni Giuliani. Material deliveries were made by master Reichardt from Moenchhof Fux.

In 1702, the project was taken over by Johann Lukas von Hildebrandt. During this phase of construction, some of the halls were completed, in particular the gold cabinet with oil paintings. Following the acquisition of the eastern properties, the facade was extended in 1708 by 12 meters. The stonework for this work was provided by the Kaisersteinbrucher master Giovanni Battista Passerini and Elias Hill. In 1710, the chapel and a gallery were added. The central focal point of the blue saloon with its frescoes by Marcantonio Chiarini dates from this time. In 1719, the palace was widened through the acquisition of the western area. The stonework was provided by Elias Hill. Lorenzo Mattielli crafted the entrance reliefs and courtyard fountains.

Upon the death of Prince Eugene in 1736, his niece Anna Viktoria of Savoy inherited the prince's property. After her marriage to Joseph Friedrich von Sachsen-Hildburghausen on 17 April 1738—he was a military commander and administrator for the Habsburgs—she put all of Prince Eugene's properties up for auction. The palace was acquired by Empress Maria Theresa for the imperial court in 1738, along with most of the prince's other buildings. In 1752, the palace was converted by Nicolò Pacassi into the seat of various state institutions. The palace housed the Finance Ministry of the Austrian Empire from 1848 to 1918 and the dissolution of the Habsburg Empire. Since 1919, the palace has housed the Ministry of Finance.

During World War II, the Winter Palace did not escape undamaged. On Sunday 8 April 1945 at 2:00 pm, in the course of a bombing raid by the Soviet Red Army, a bomb shattered the roof of the palace and another bomb exploded in the attic. The ceiling painting by the French painter Ludovico Dorigny was damaged, but was eventually restored by experts from the Academy of Fine Arts Vienna. From 2007 to 2013, the palace underwent extensive renovations. On 18 October 2013, the main rooms of the Winter Palace state apartments became accessible to the public as the Belvedere's new exhibition venue in Vienna's Innere Stadt.

== Description ==
The Winter Palace has a twelve-bay flat Baroque façade with three portals, each given double corbels that support a balcony and decorated balustrade. In place of standard columns or pillars, Fischer von Erlach designed bas-reliefs depicting military scenes from ancient mythology—Hercules fighting the giant Antaeus on the left, and Aeneas saving his father Anchises from burning Troy on the right. These images from the classical world are meant to invoke Prince Eugene's glorious military accomplishments. Above each portal are tall windows of the piano nobile, made distinct from the other windows by their reversed segmented pediments with insert cartouches. The façade is broken up by colossal pilasters with flat composite capitals that extend the full height of the building to the cornice.

== Gallery ==
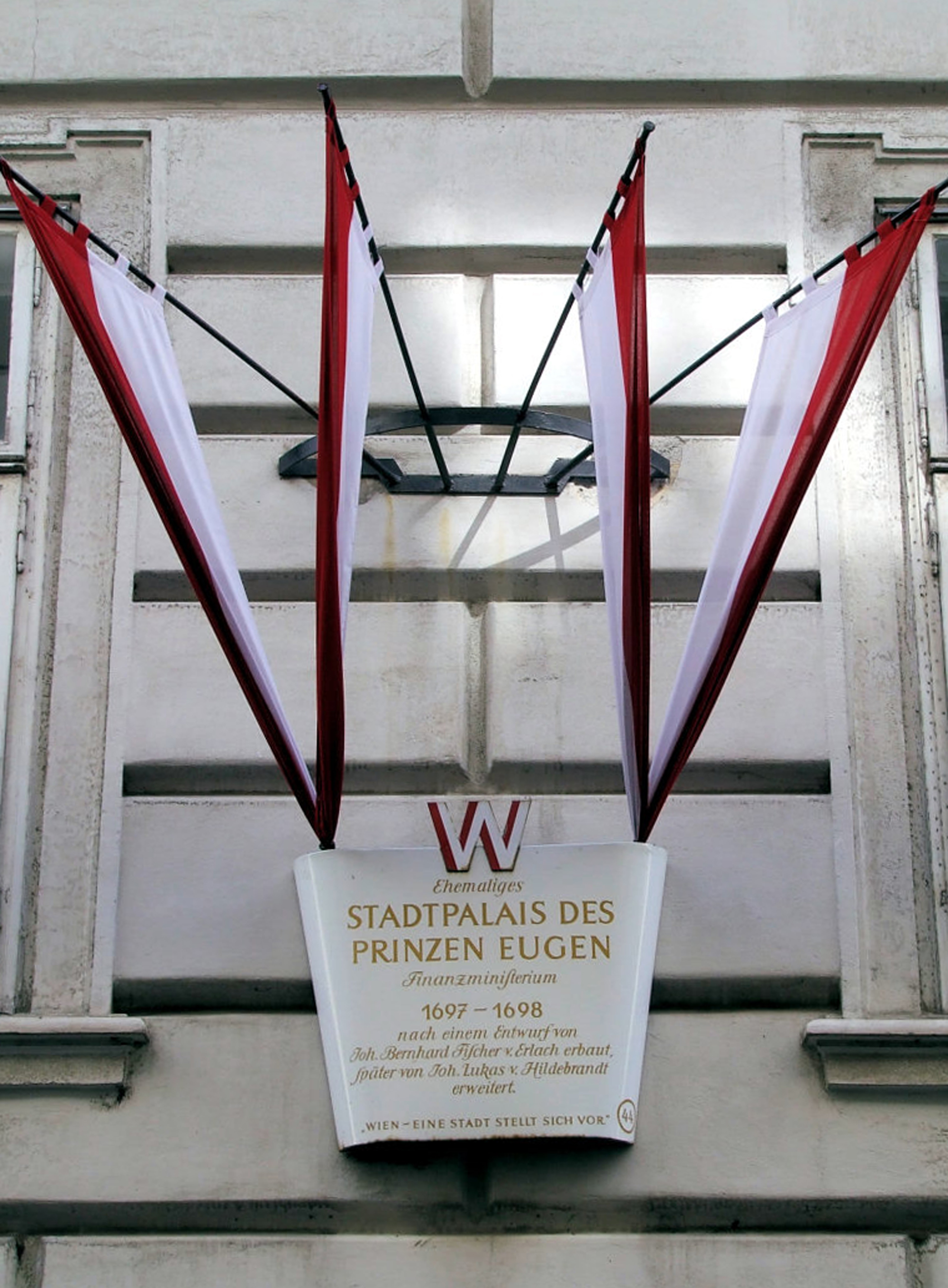
Historical information marker

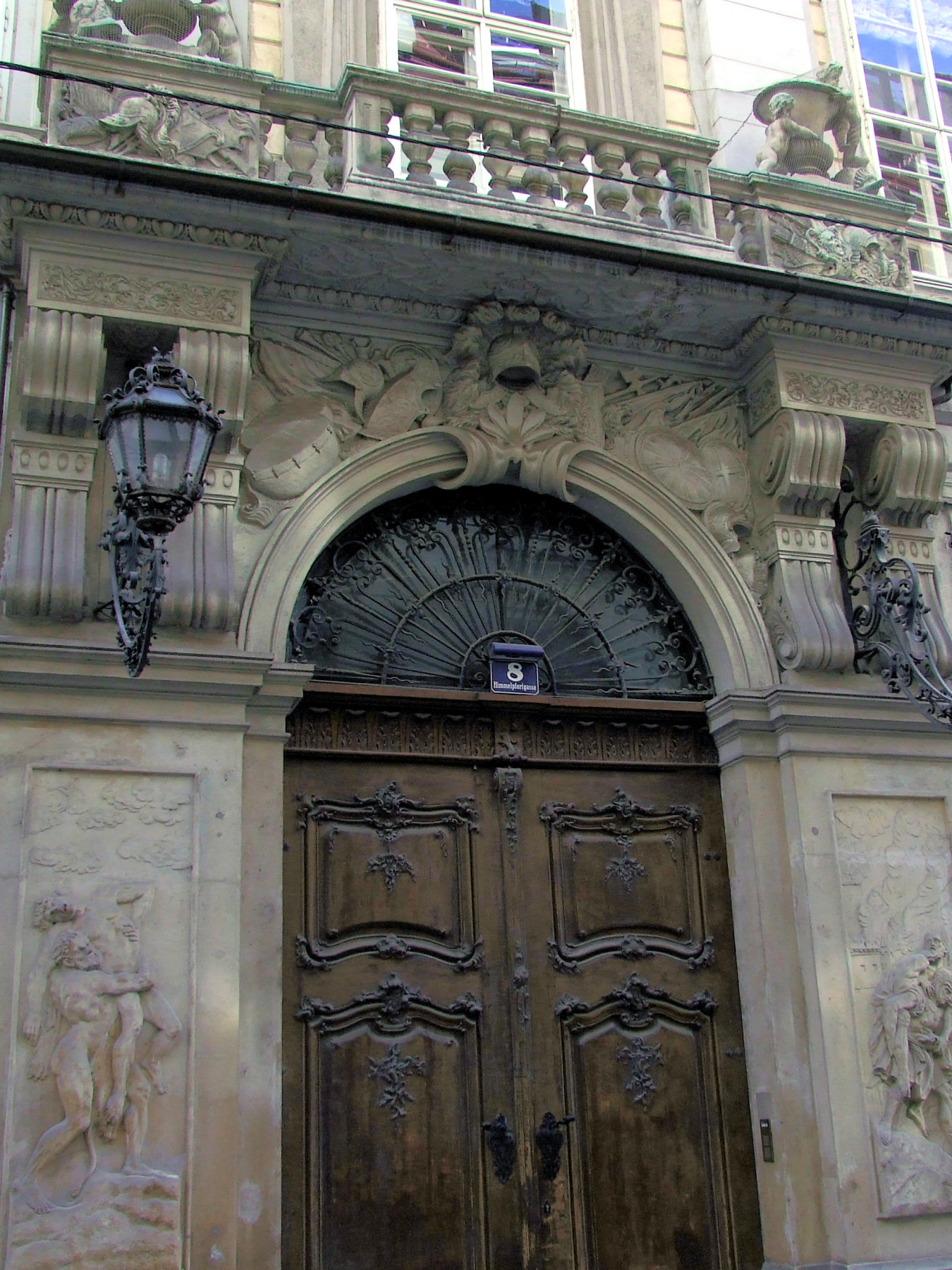
Palace entrance

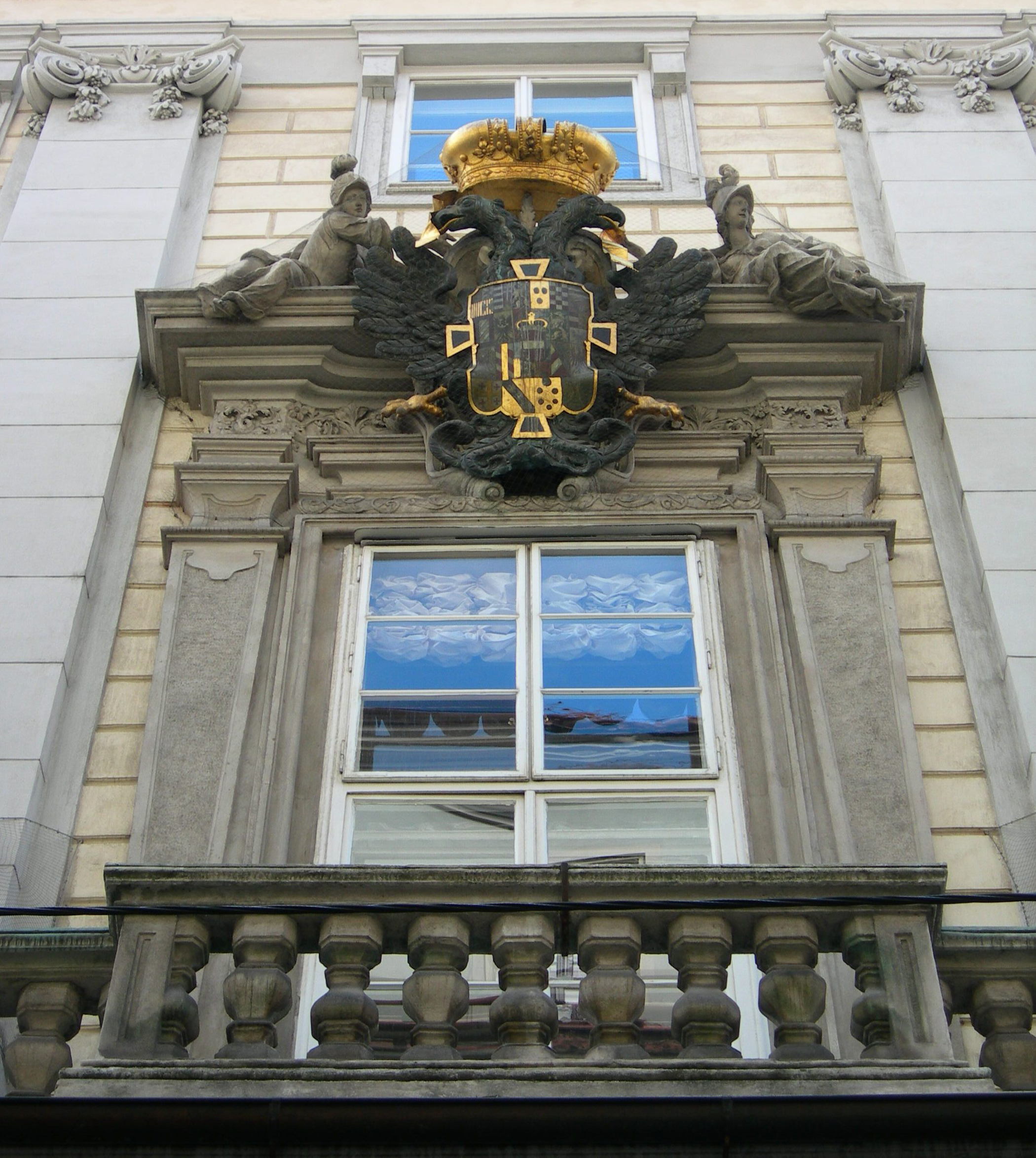
Front portal balustrade, piano nobile windows, and coat of arms

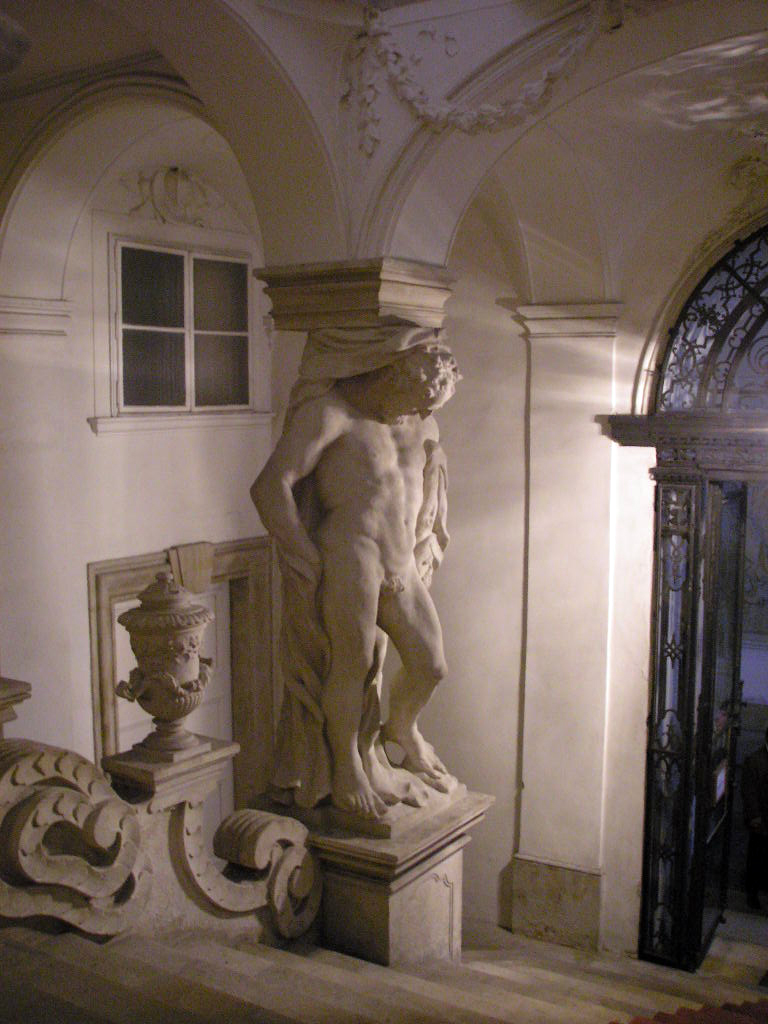
Staircase statue

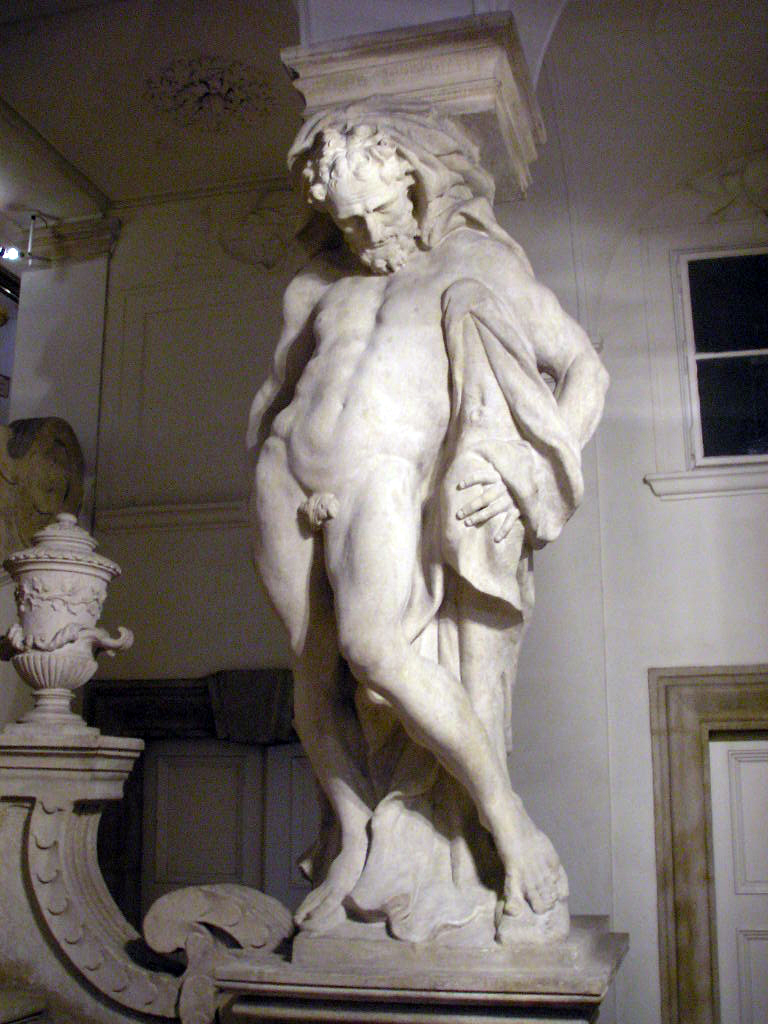
Staircase statue

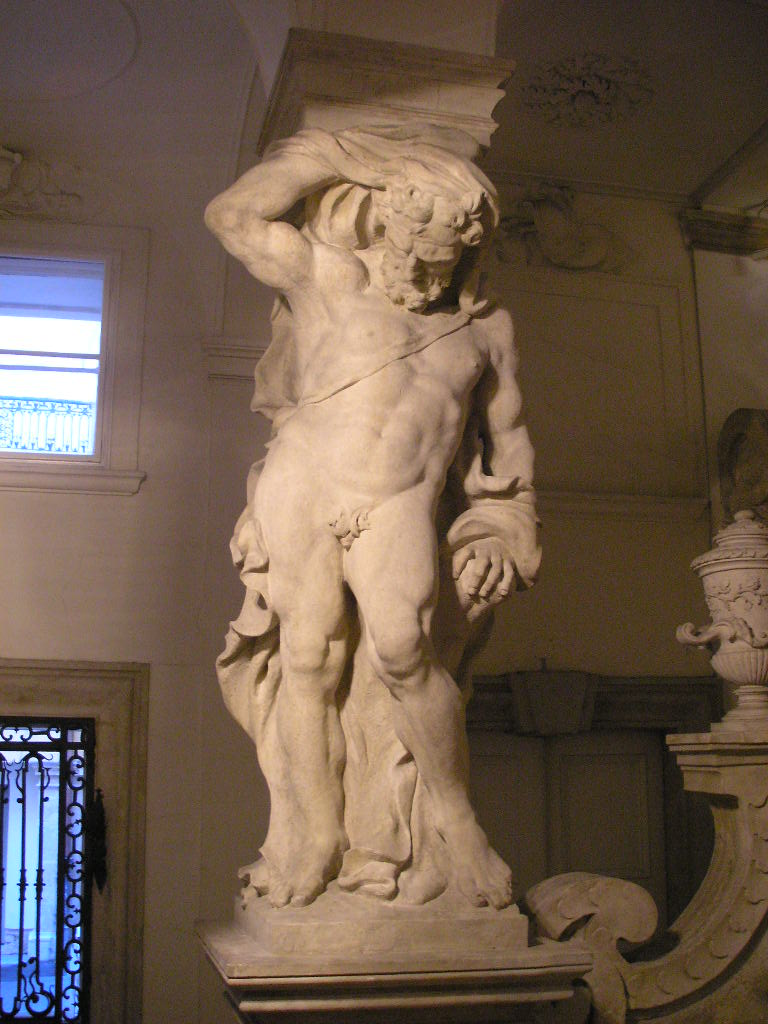
Staircase statue

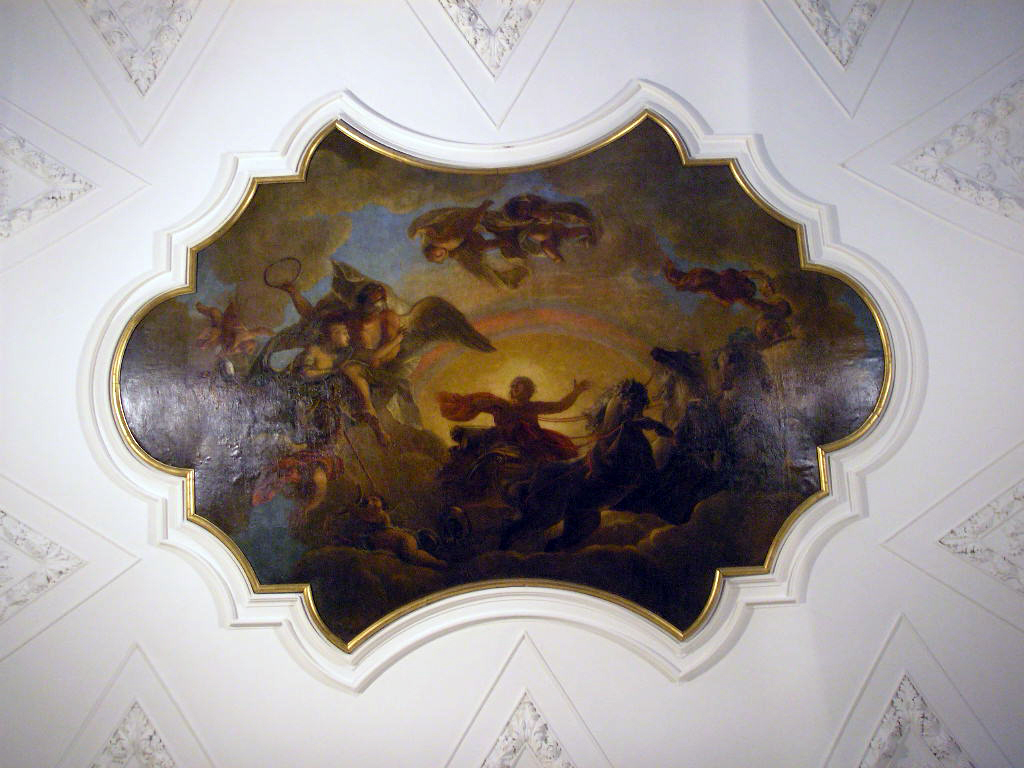
Ceiling fresco above the staircase

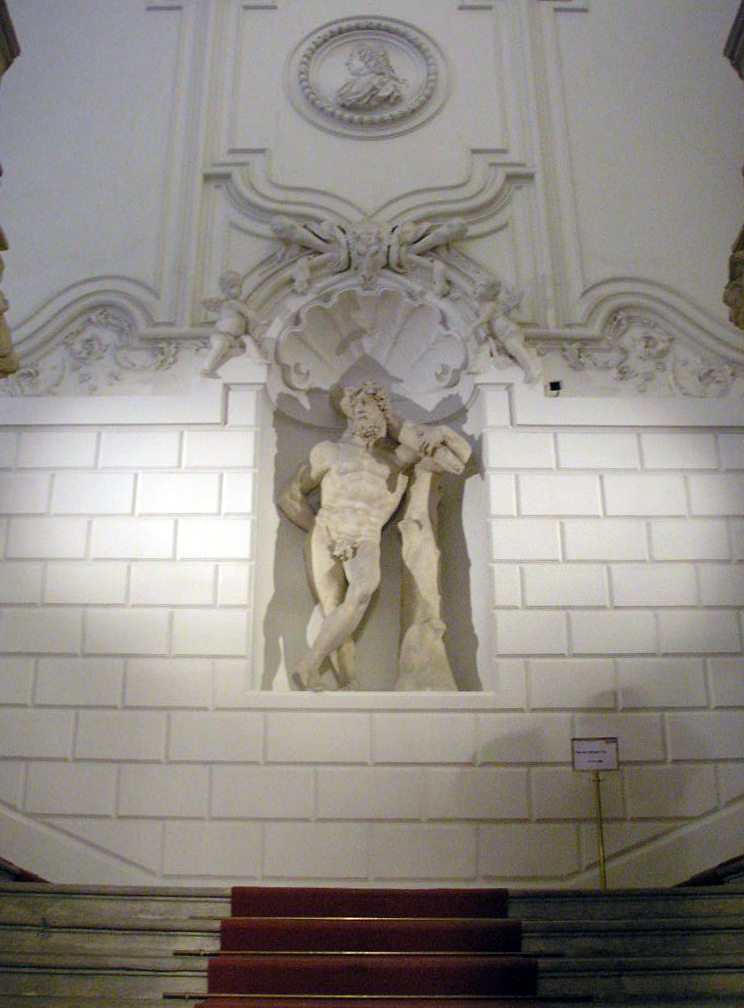
Hercules statue

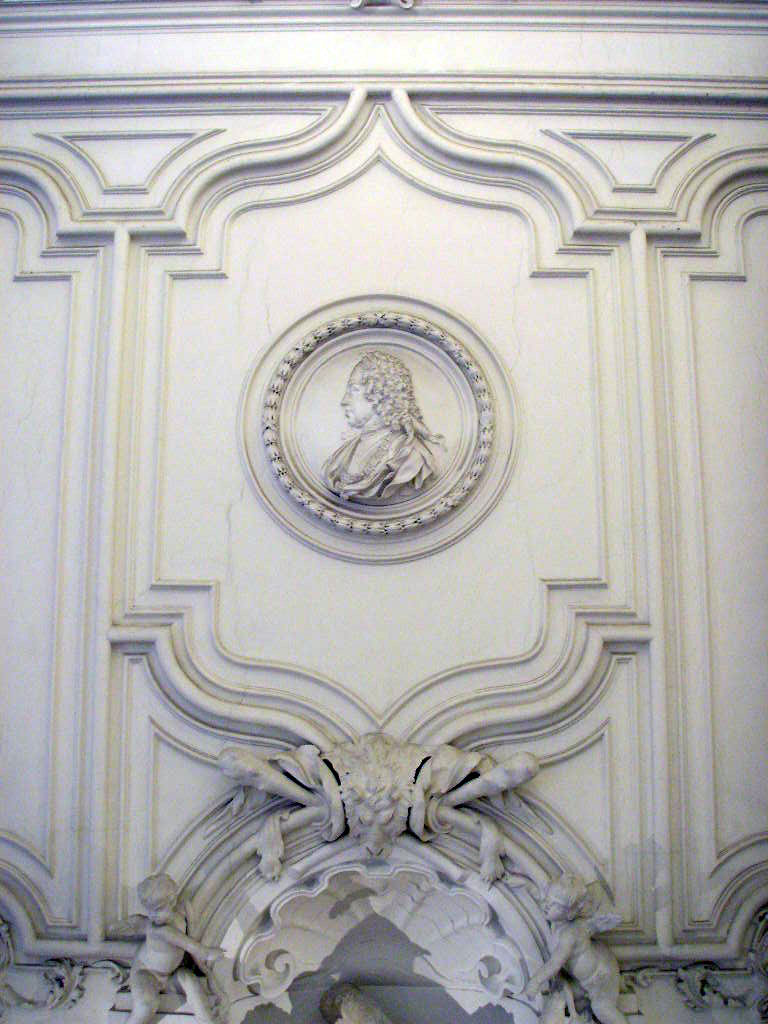
Palace interior

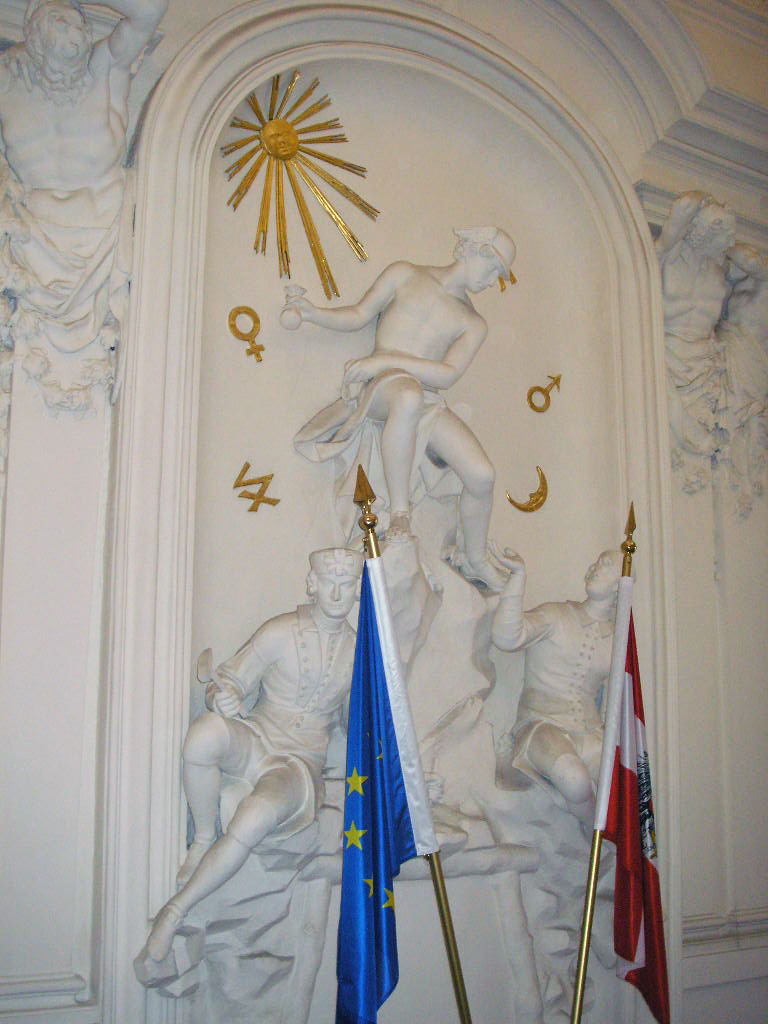
Palace interior

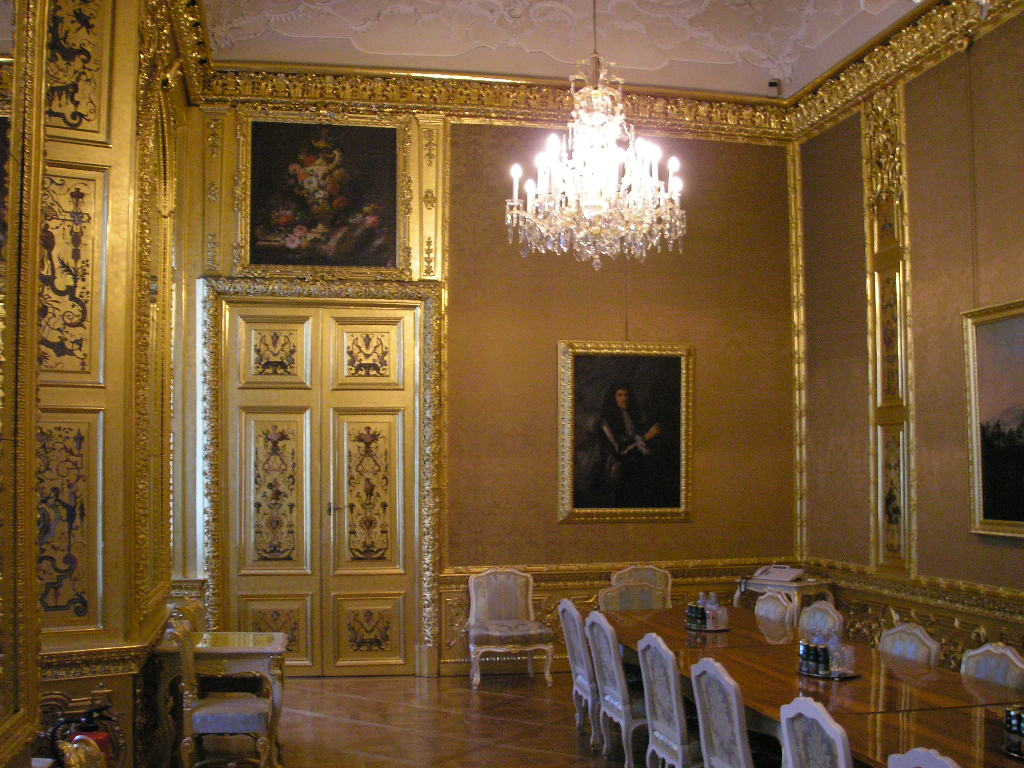
Palace interior
