= Vienna Secession =

Group of Austrian artists and architects

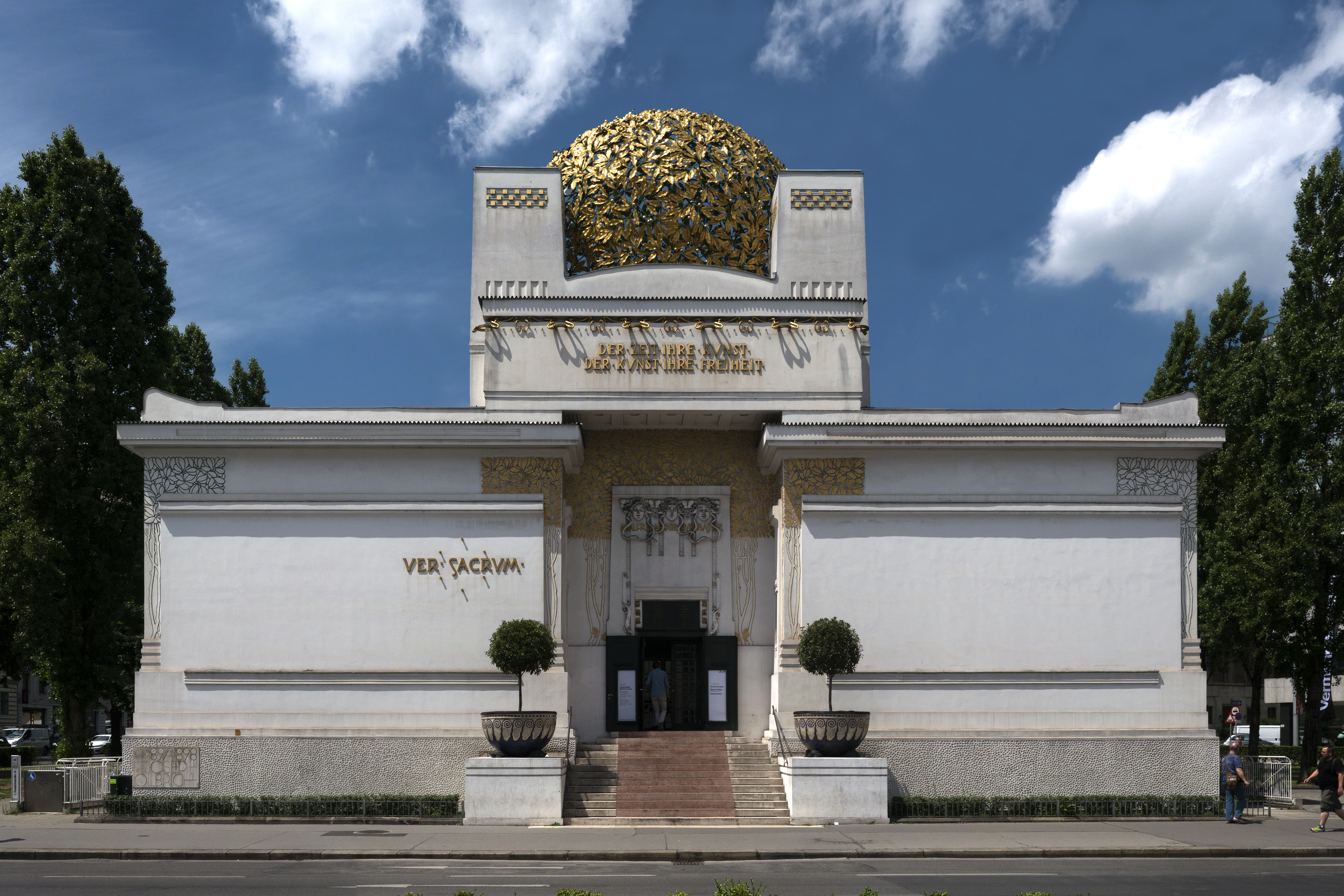
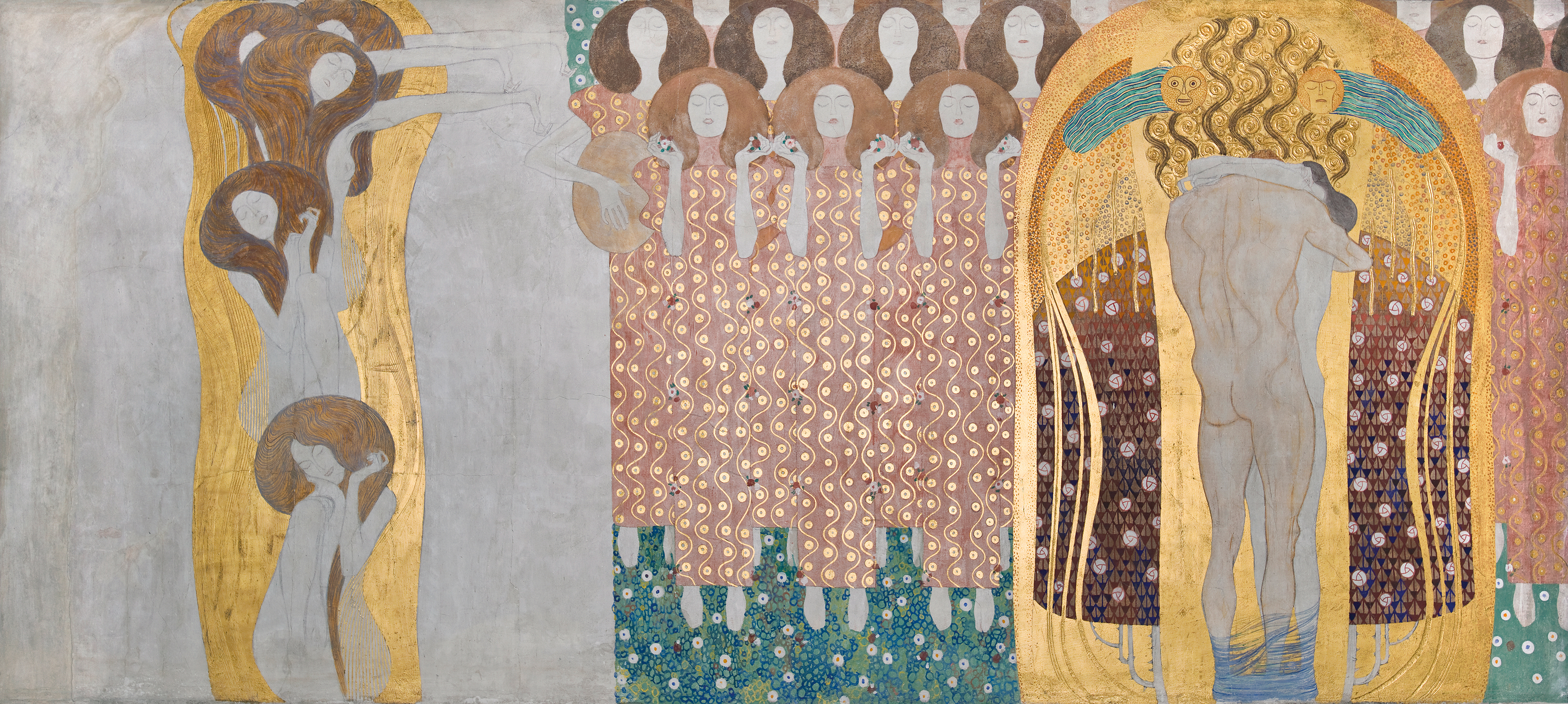
- Top: Secession Building in Vienna designed by Joseph Maria Olbrich (1897–1898); Bottom: Excerpts of the Beethoven Frieze by Gustav Klimt (1902)

Additional media
- Years active: c. 1897–1914
- Location: Austria
- Major figures: Gustav Klimt, Joseph Maria Olbrich, Josef Hoffmann, Otto Wagner
- Influences: Art Nouveau

The Vienna Secession (German: Wiener Secession; also known as the Union of Austrian Artists or Vereinigung Bildender Künstler Österreichs) is an art movement, closely related to Art Nouveau, that was formed in 1897 by a group of Austrian painters, graphic artists, sculptors and architects, including Josef Hoffman, Koloman Moser, Otto Wagner and Gustav Klimt.

They resigned from the Association of Austrian Artists (Vienna Künstlerhaus) in protest against its support for more traditional artistic styles. Their most influential architectural work was the Secession exhibitions hall designed by Joseph Maria Olbrich as a venue for expositions of the group. Their official magazine was called Ver Sacrum ('Sacred Spring'), which published highly stylised and influential works of graphic art. In 1905 the group itself split, when some of the most prominent members, including Klimt, Wagner, and Hoffmann, resigned in a dispute over priorities, but it continued to function, and still functions today, from its headquarters in the Secession Building. In its current form, the Secession exhibition gallery is independently led and managed by artists.

== History ==
=== Founding ===
The Vienna Secession was founded on 3 April 1897 by artist Gustav Klimt, designer Koloman Moser, architects Josef Hoffmann and Joseph Maria Olbrich, Max Kurzweil, Wilhelm Bernatzik, sculptor Edmund von Hellmer and others. The architect Otto Wagner joined the group shortly after it was founded. The goals stated at the founding included establishing contact and an exchange of ideas with artists outside Austria, disputing artistic nationalism, renewing the decorative arts; creating a Gesamtkunstwerk, 'total art', that unified painting, architecture, and the decorative arts; and, in particular, opposing the domination of the official Vienna Academy of the Arts, the Vienna Künstlerhaus, and official art salons, with its traditional orientation toward Historicism.

The movement took its name from Munich Secession movement that was founded in 1892. The goals of the new movement in Vienna were expressed by the literary critic Hermann Bahr in the first issue of the new journal begun by the group, called Ver Sacrum ("Sacred Spring"). Bahr wrote, "Our art is not a combat of modern artists against those of the past, but the promotion of the arts against the peddlers who pose as artists and who have a commercial interest in not letting art bloom. The choice between commerce and art is the issue at stake in our Secession. It is not a debate over aesthetics, but a confrontation between two different spiritual states."

In the beginning, the Secession had fifty members, and at its first gathering elected the painter Gustav Klimt as its president. Other founding or early members included the architect Josef Hoffmann, the designer Koloman Moser, the designer and architect Joseph Maria Olbrich, and the painters Max Kurzweil and Alphonse Mucha, who resided in Paris and was already famous for his Art Nouveau posters and pictures of the actress Sarah Bernhardt. The established painter Rudolf von Alt, eighty-five years old, was chosen as the Honorary President of the group, and he led a delegation with an invitation to the Emperor Franz-Joseph to attend the first Exposition.

The first architectural project of the Secession was the creation of an exhibit space which would introduce international artists and art movements to Vienna. The architect was Joseph Maria Olbrich, a student of Otto Wagner; and his domed gallery building, with a sculptural frieze over the entrance, in the centre of Vienna, became the symbol of the movement. It was the first dedicated gallery of contemporary art in the city. This helped make the French Impressionists and others familiar to the Viennese public. With the help of a network of art dealers such as Paul Cassirer, Durand-Ruel, and Bernheim-Jeune and the support of the delegate of the Vienna Secession in Paris François-Rupert Carabin works by Bonnard, Degas, Denis, Manet, Monet, Morisot, Pissarro, Renoir, Sisley, Toulouse-Lautrec, Valloton, Vuillard etc. were presented in the Vienna Secession between 1899 and 1903.

The 14th Secession exhibition in 1902, designed by Josef Hoffmann and dedicated to Ludwig van Beethoven, was especially famous. A statue of Beethoven by Max Klinger stood at the centre, with Klimt's Beethoven Frieze mounted around it. The Klimt frieze has been restored and can be seen in the gallery today.

=== Split within the Secession ===
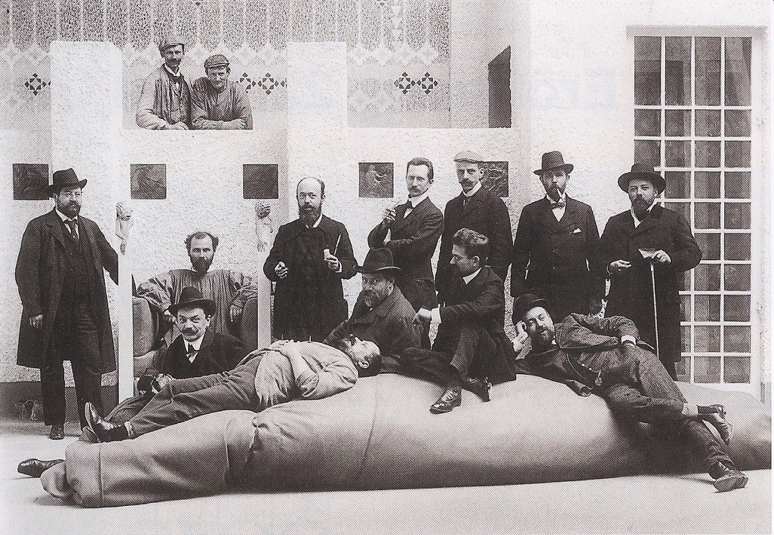
Secession Group in Vienna (1902)

In 1899, Olbrich left Vienna to join the Darmstadt Artists' Colony. In 1900, he obtained Hessian citizenship and did not work in Austria again.

In 1903, Hoffmann and Moser founded the Wiener Werkstätte as a fine-arts society with the goal of reforming the applied arts (arts and crafts). In 1907, Wiener Werkstätte and Hoffmann personally became founding members of Deutscher Werkbund.

After the founding of the Wiener Werkstätte, it was above all the organisation of the world exhibition in St. Louis in 1904 that sparked differences in the Secession. This failed exhibition led to fierce opposition within the association. An important division soon emerged inside the Secession between those who wished to give precedence to the painters and the traditional fine arts, and others, including Klimt, Hoffmann, Wagner, Moser and others who favoured equal treatment for the decorative arts. This dispute came to a head in 1905 when Galerie Miethke's artistic consultant (and a painter himself), Carl Moll, proposed that the Secession purchase the Gallery, as an outlet for its work. This was supported by Klimt, Wagner, Hoffmann, Moser, and others. The issue was put to a vote by the members, and Klimt and his supporters lost by a single vote. On 14 June 1905, Klimt, Hoffmann, Moser and a group of other artists resigned from the Secession. The following year, Klimt formed the group called Kunstschau (Art Show) or Klimtgruppe (Klimt group), which also included Moll and Otto Wagner, among other important Austrian artists.

=== Later years ===
The Secession continued to function after the departure of Klimt, Hoffmann, Wagner and their supporters, giving regular exhibitions in the Secession building, but they lacked the originality and excitement of the earlier period. The designer Peter Behrens became a member of the Secession in 1938. Under the regime of the Nazi Party the Secession building was destroyed as a symbol of degenerate art, but was faithfully reconstructed following World War II.

In 1945, following the War, Hoffmann rejoined the Vienna Secession, the artistic movement from which he, Klimt and Wagner had dramatically quit in 1905. He was elected President of the Secession from 1948 to 1950. The Secession continues to function today, holding regular exhibitions in the Secession Hall.

== Genres of Art ==
=== Painting and Graphic Arts ===
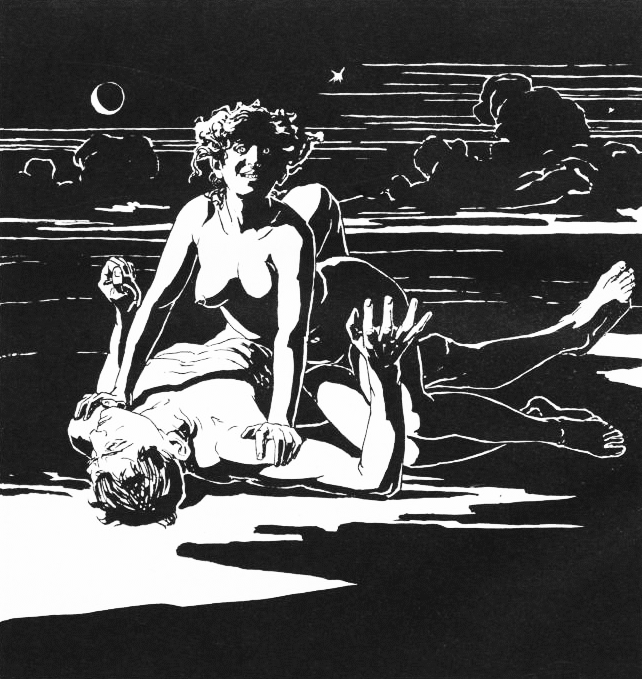
Vampire in Ver Sacrum #12 (1899) p. 8 by Ernst Stöhr

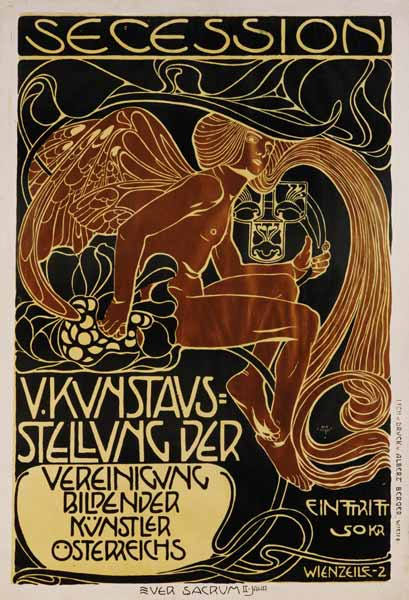
Poster by Koloman Moser (1899)

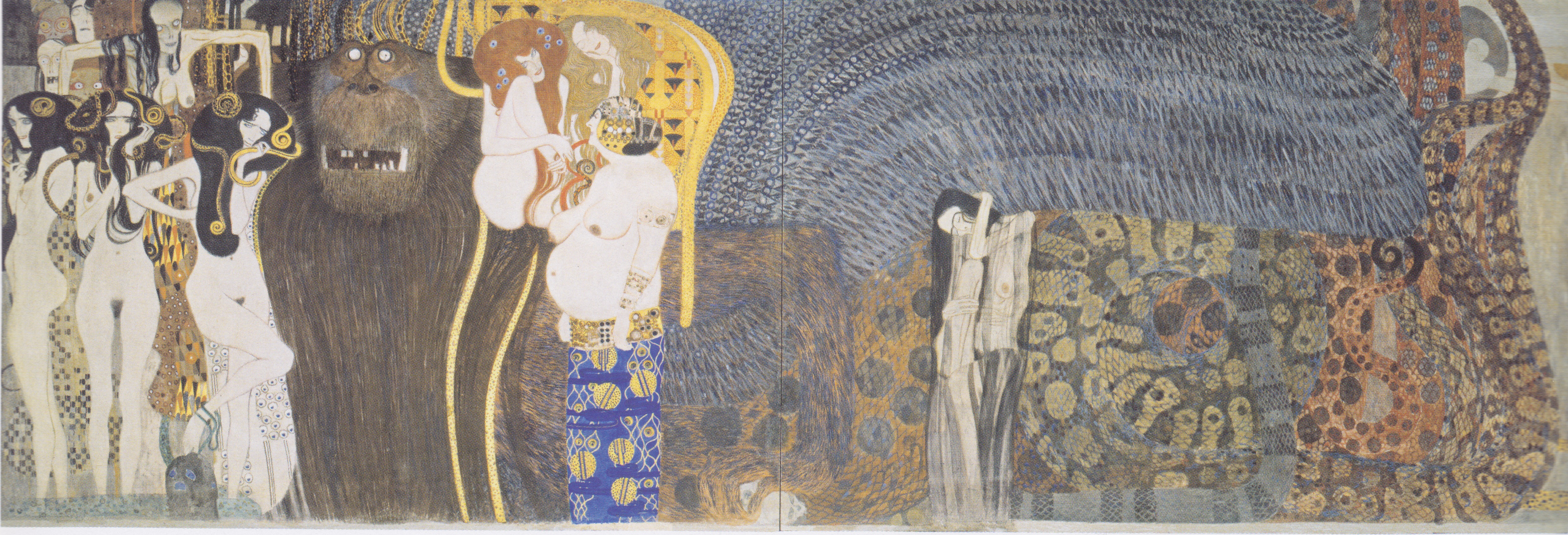
Section of the Beethoven Frieze by Gustav Klimt in the Secession Building (1902)

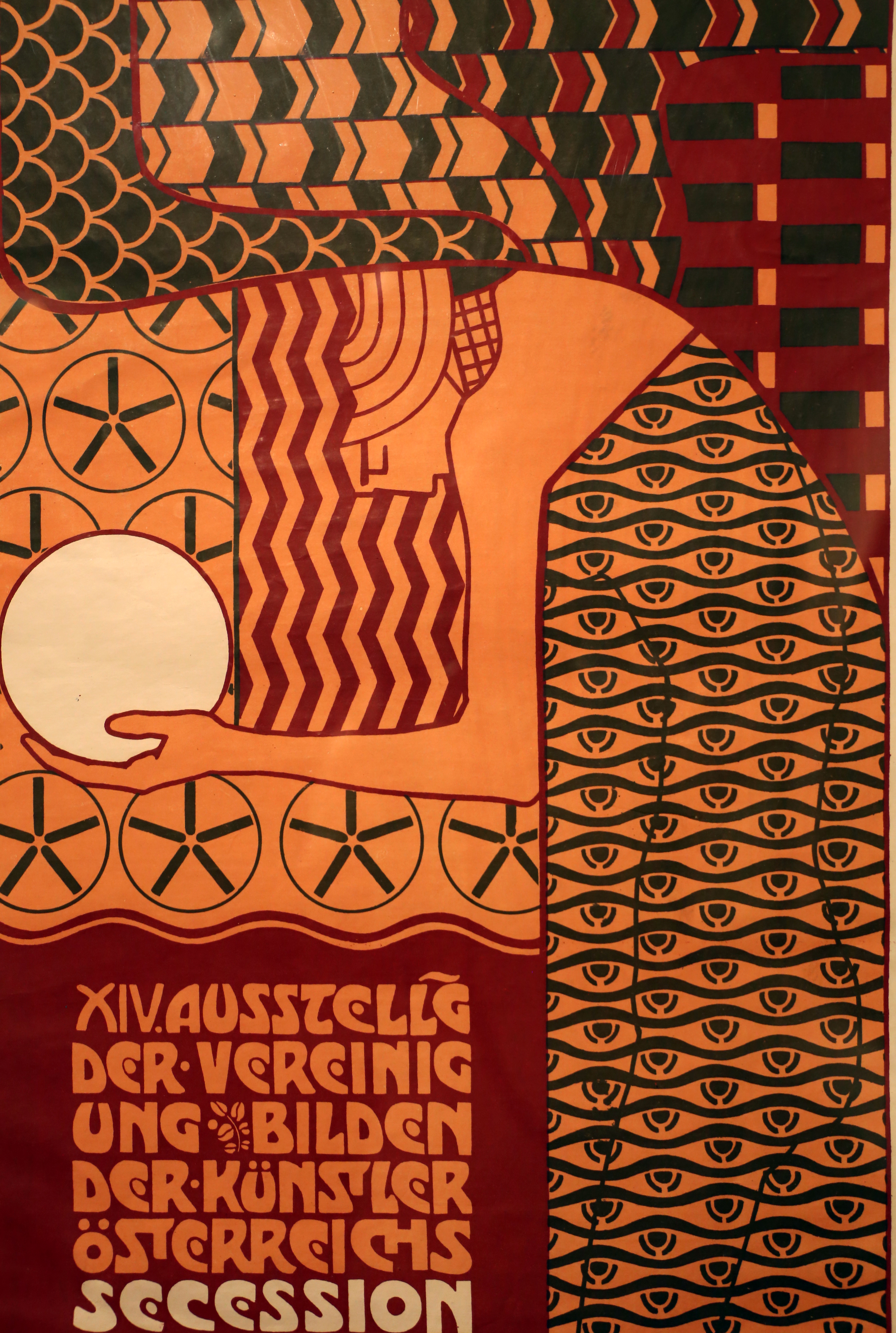
Poster for the 14th Secession Exhibit (1902), by Alfred Roller

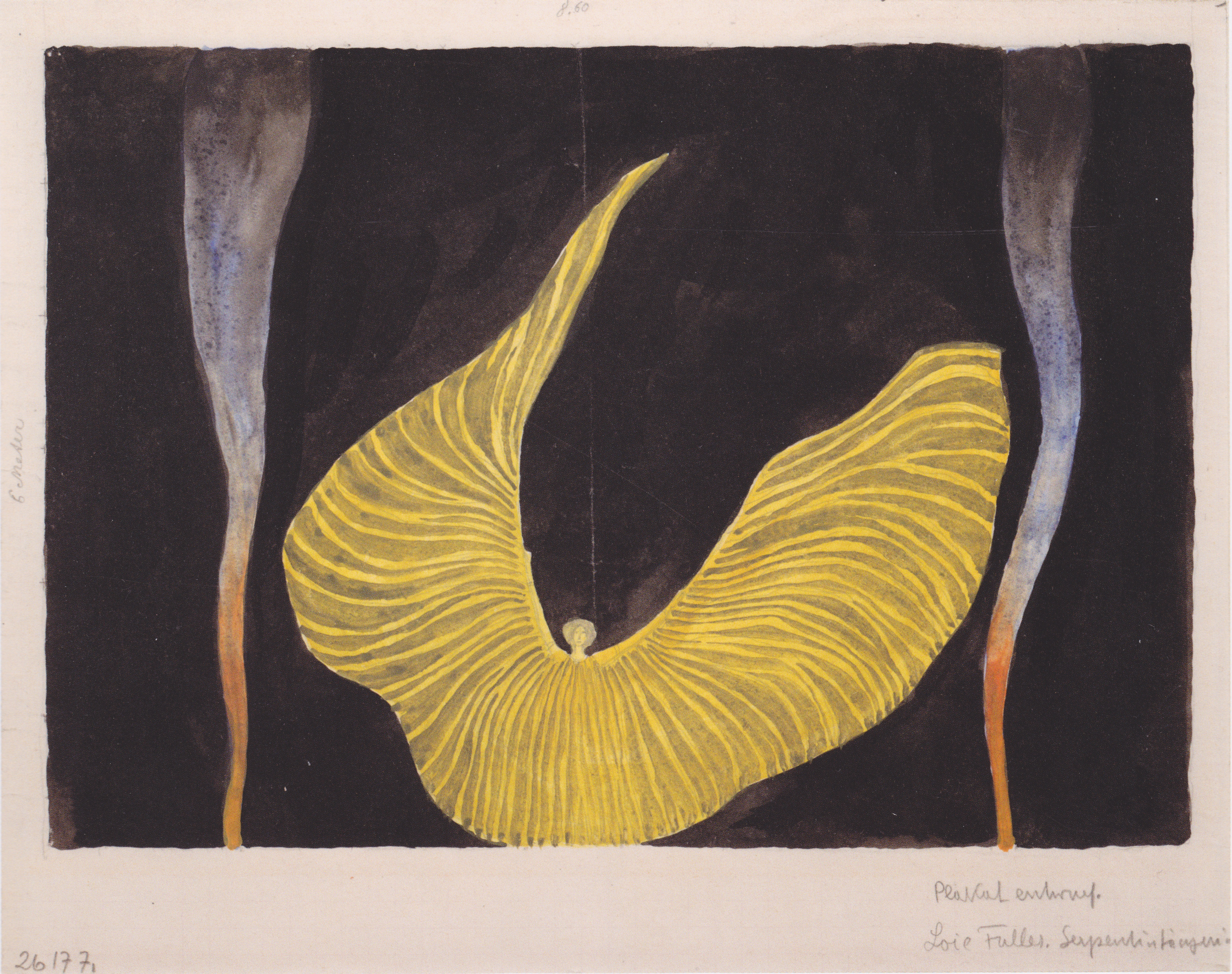
Dance by Koloman Moser (1902), inspired by dancer Loïe Fuller

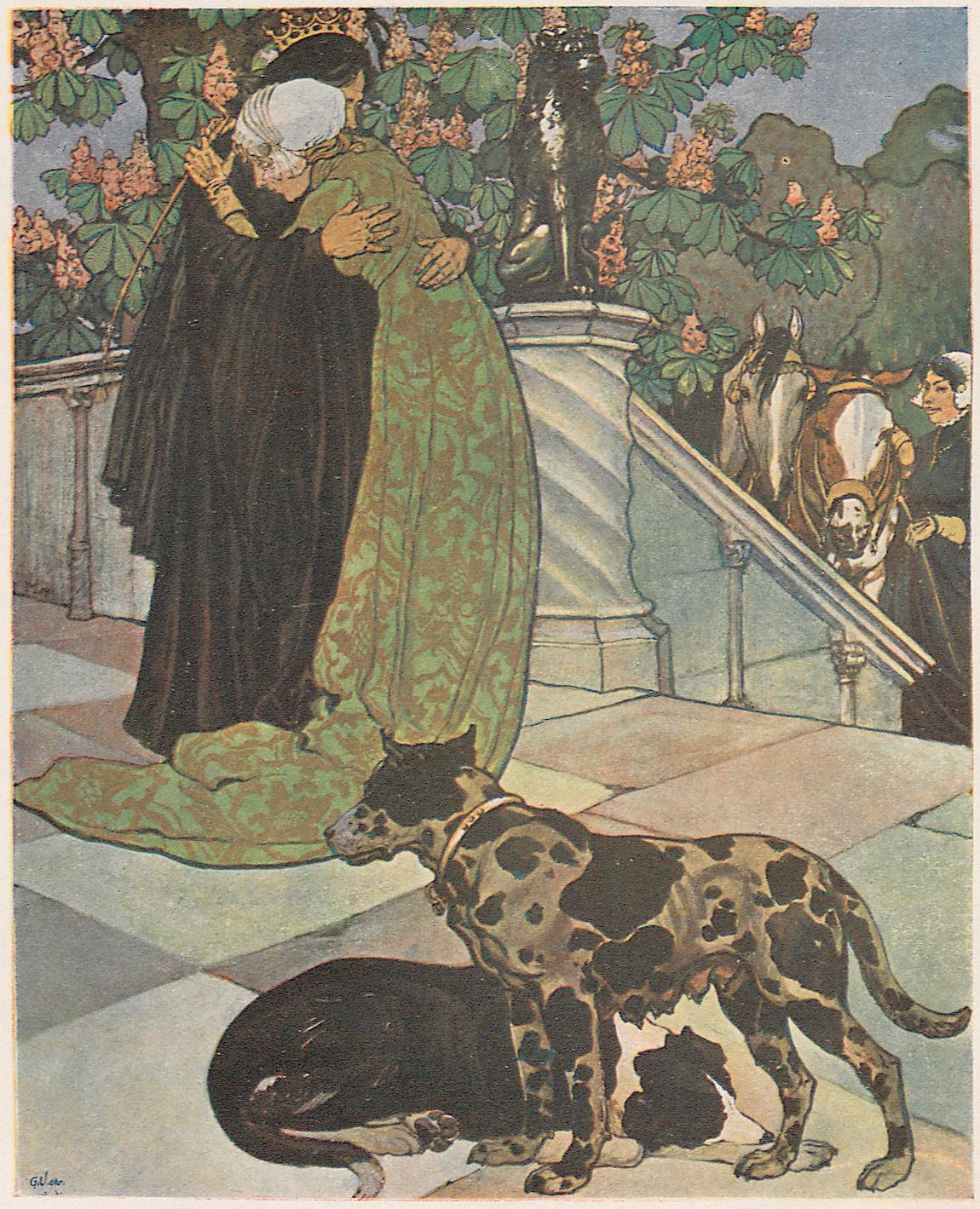
Illustration to The Goose Girl by Maximilian Liebenwein, published in Ver Sacrum (1902)

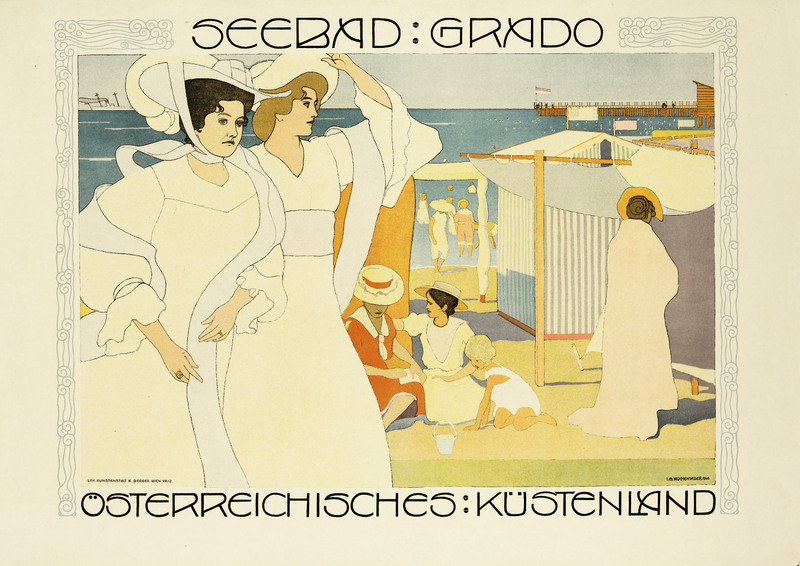
Advertising poster of Grado by Josef Maria Auchentaller (1906)

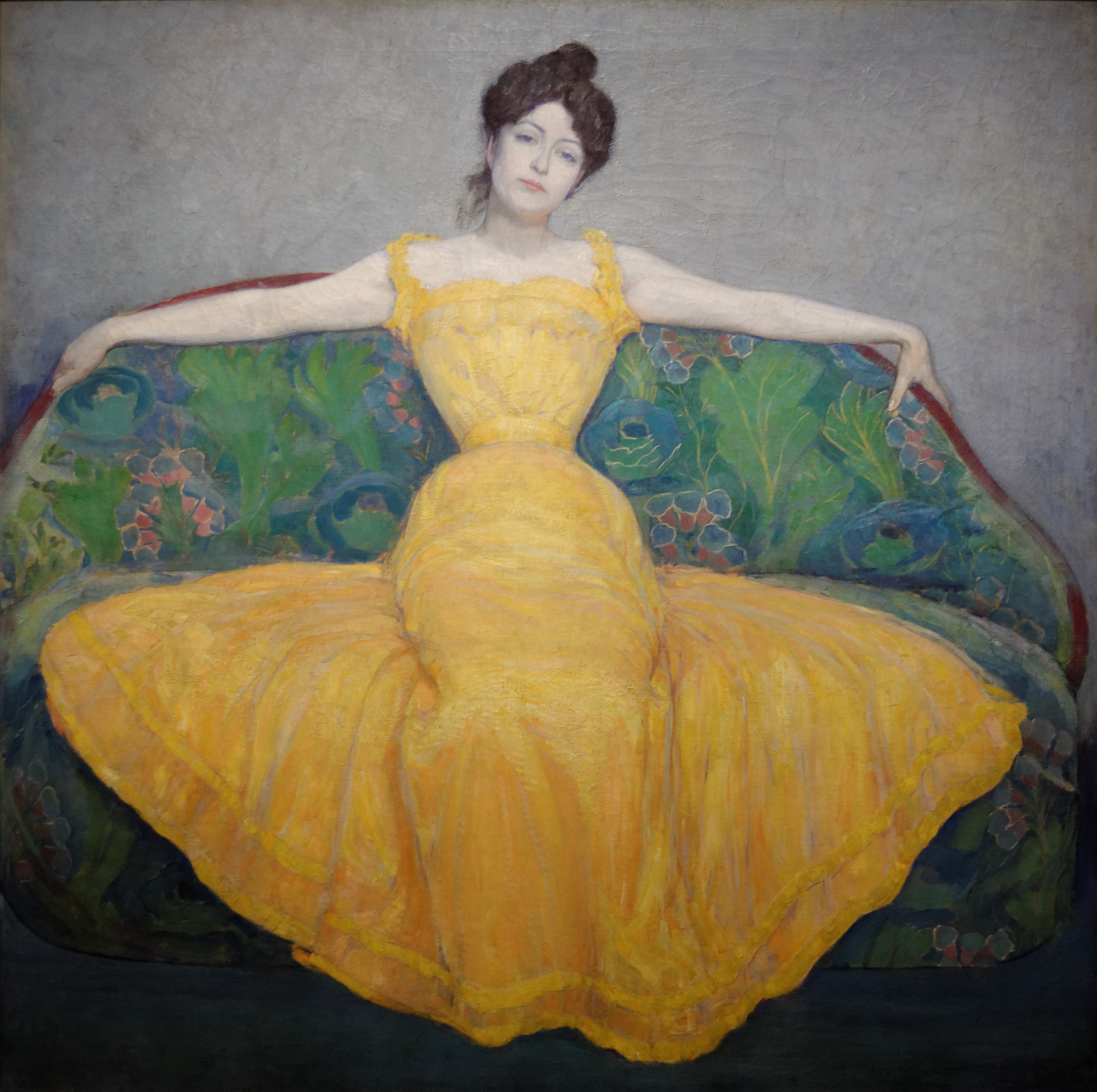
Woman in a Yellow Dress by Max Kurzweil (1899)

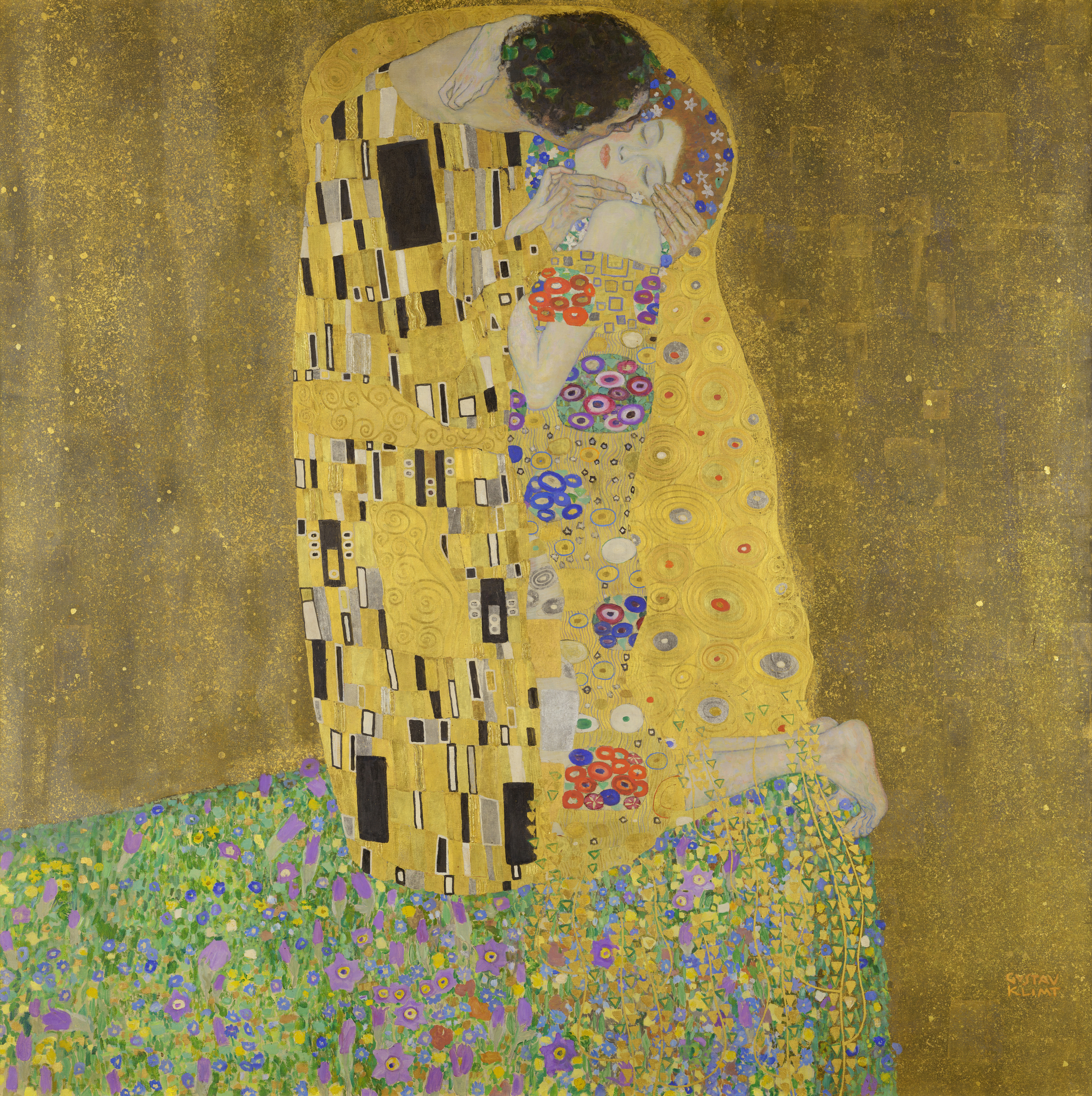
The Kiss by Gustav Klimt (1907–08) (Note: This painting is considered to be Klimt's most popular work.)

=== Architecture ===
Along with painters and sculptors, several prominent architects were associated with the Vienna Secession, most notably Joseph Maria Olbrich, Otto Wagner, and Josef Hoffmann. In 1897–98 Olbrich designed the Secession Building to display the art of Klimt and the members of the group, and also by foreign artists, including Max Klinger, Eugène Grasset, Charles Rennie Mackintosh, and Arnold Böcklin. Josef Hoffmann became the principal designer of exhibitions at the Secession House. The dome and stylised facade became a symbol of the movement.

A group of artists including Koloman Moser, Othmar Schimkowitz, Jože Plečnik, and others, under the direction of architect Otto Wagner, decorated two apartment buildings Wagner designed; the Linke Wienzeile Buildings in 1898–1899. The building at Linke Wienzeile 40 is known as Majolikahaus or Majolica House. Its facade is entirely covered with majolica, or colorful fired clay tiles in floral designs. The Art Nouveau ornaments of its facade was done by his student Alois Ludwig. The other building, Linke Wienzeile 38, is known as House with medallions because of its decor of gilded stucco medallions by Wagner's student and frequent collaborator, Koloman Moser. The most ornate earlier decoration was removed but later restored.

During this period, Otto Wagner also built extraordinarily stylised stations for the new Vienna urban transport system, the Stadtbahn, which also became the symbols of the Secession style. The most famous of these is the Karlsplatz Stadtbahn Station in the centre of Vienna, Joseph Maria Olbrich was his collaborator for this project. The style of these buildings marked a transition toward more geometric forms, and the beginnings of modernism.

Wagner's later buildings built after 1899, including the Church of St. Leopold (1902–1907) and especially the Austrian Postal Savings Bank (1903–1906, extended at 1910–12), had straight lines and geometric forms, a striking use of new materials, such reinforced concrete and aluminum, and a minimum of decoration on the facade or inside.

The work of Josef Hoffmann also showed a gradual transition away from floral designs and curving lines. His best-known building, the Stoclet Palace in Brussels, had a tower of stacked cubic forms, minimum ornament on the facade, and an interior of right angles and geometric designs. The only Art Nouveau elements were the Stoclet Frieze murals by Gustav Klimt. The Stoclet Palace best illustrated Hoffmann's transition from Art Nouveau toward modernism.

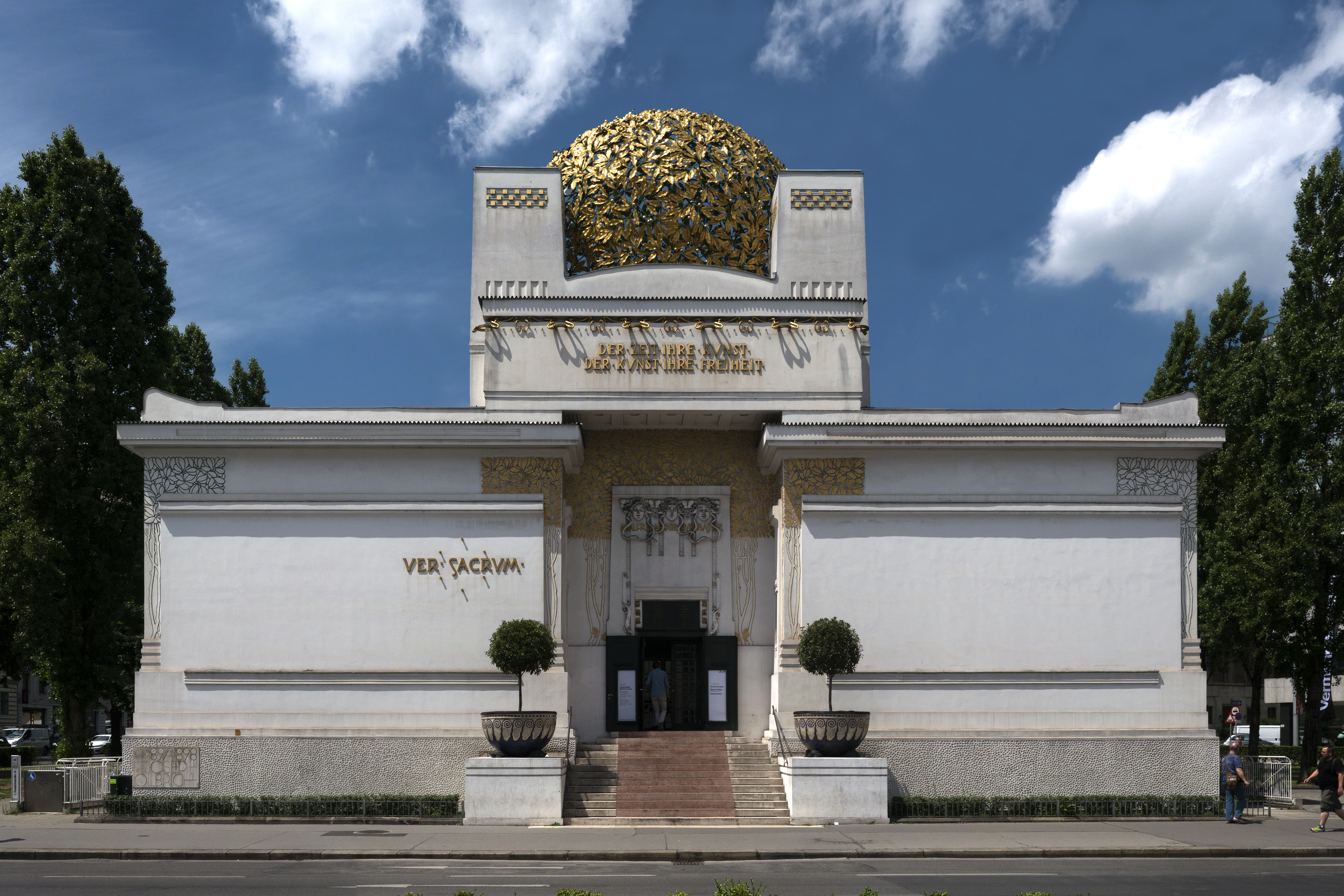
Secession Building by Joseph Maria Olbrich (1897–98)

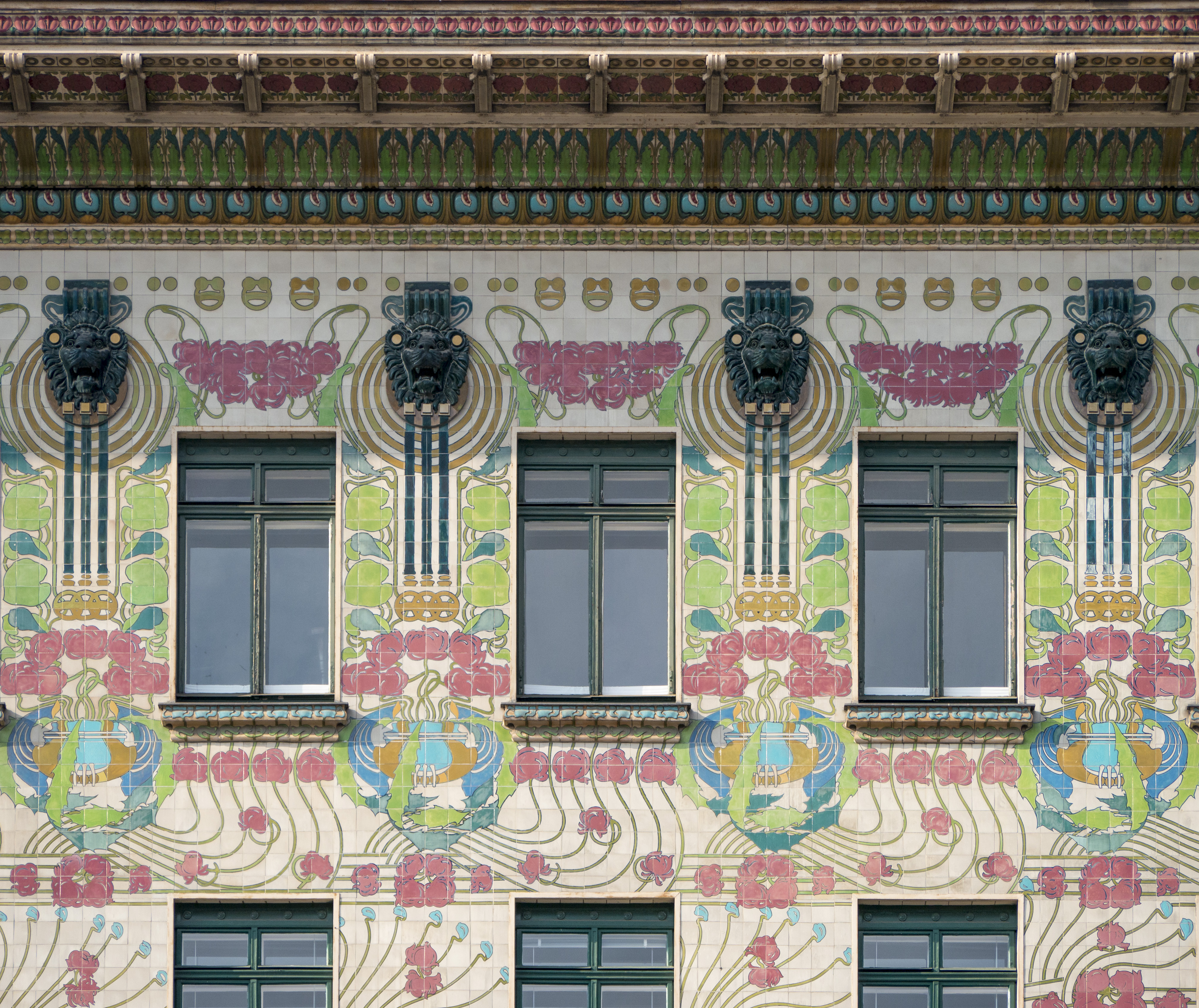
Floral design by Alois Ludwig Pichl on the facade of one of the Linke Wienzeile Buildings by Otto Wagner (1898)

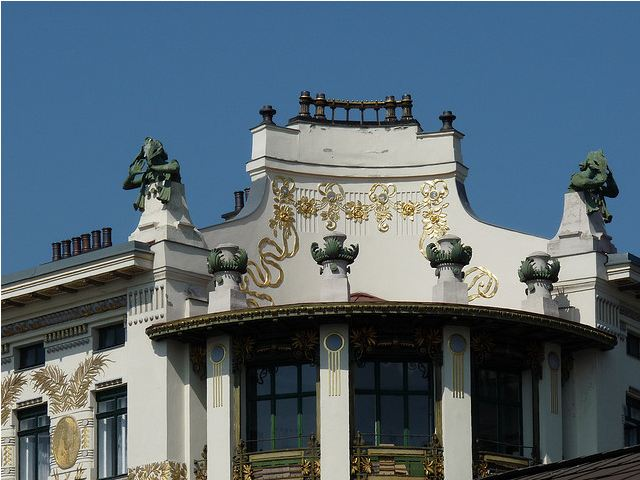
A medallion by Koloman Moser and sculptures by Othmar Schimkowitz at Linke Wienzeile 38 (1898)

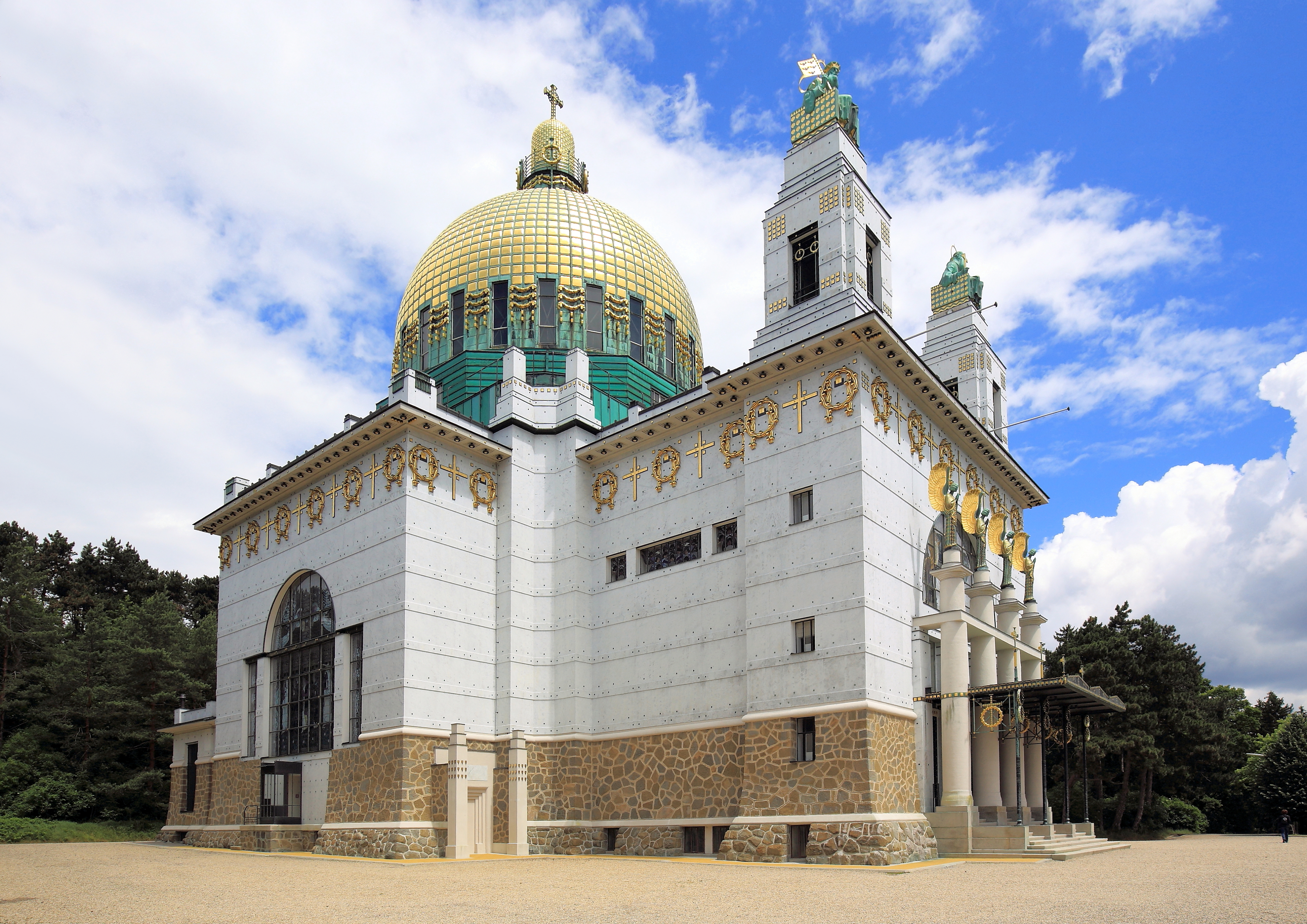
Church of St. Leopold by Otto Wagner (1902–1907)

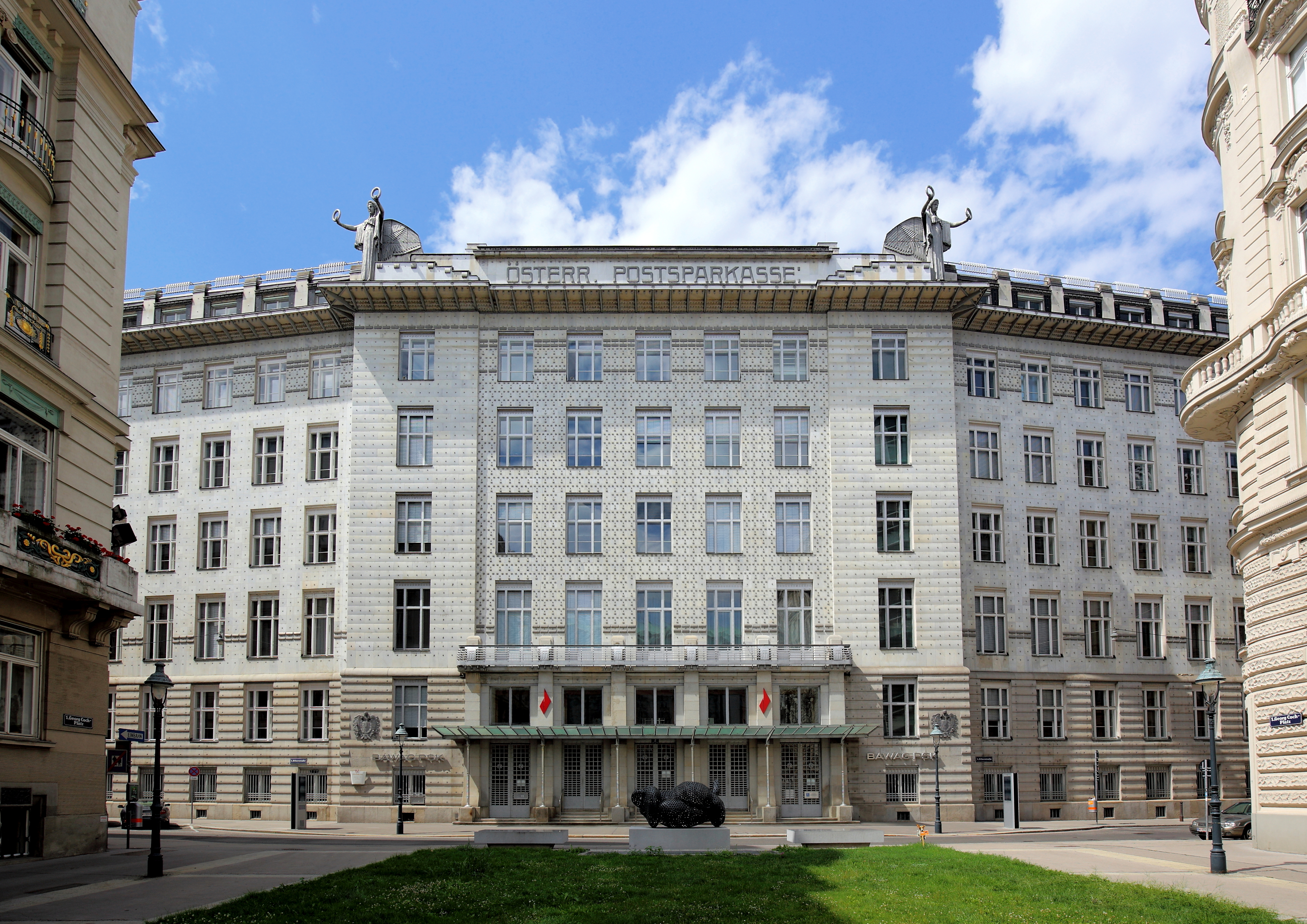
Austrian Postal Savings Bank by Otto Wagner (1904-1912)

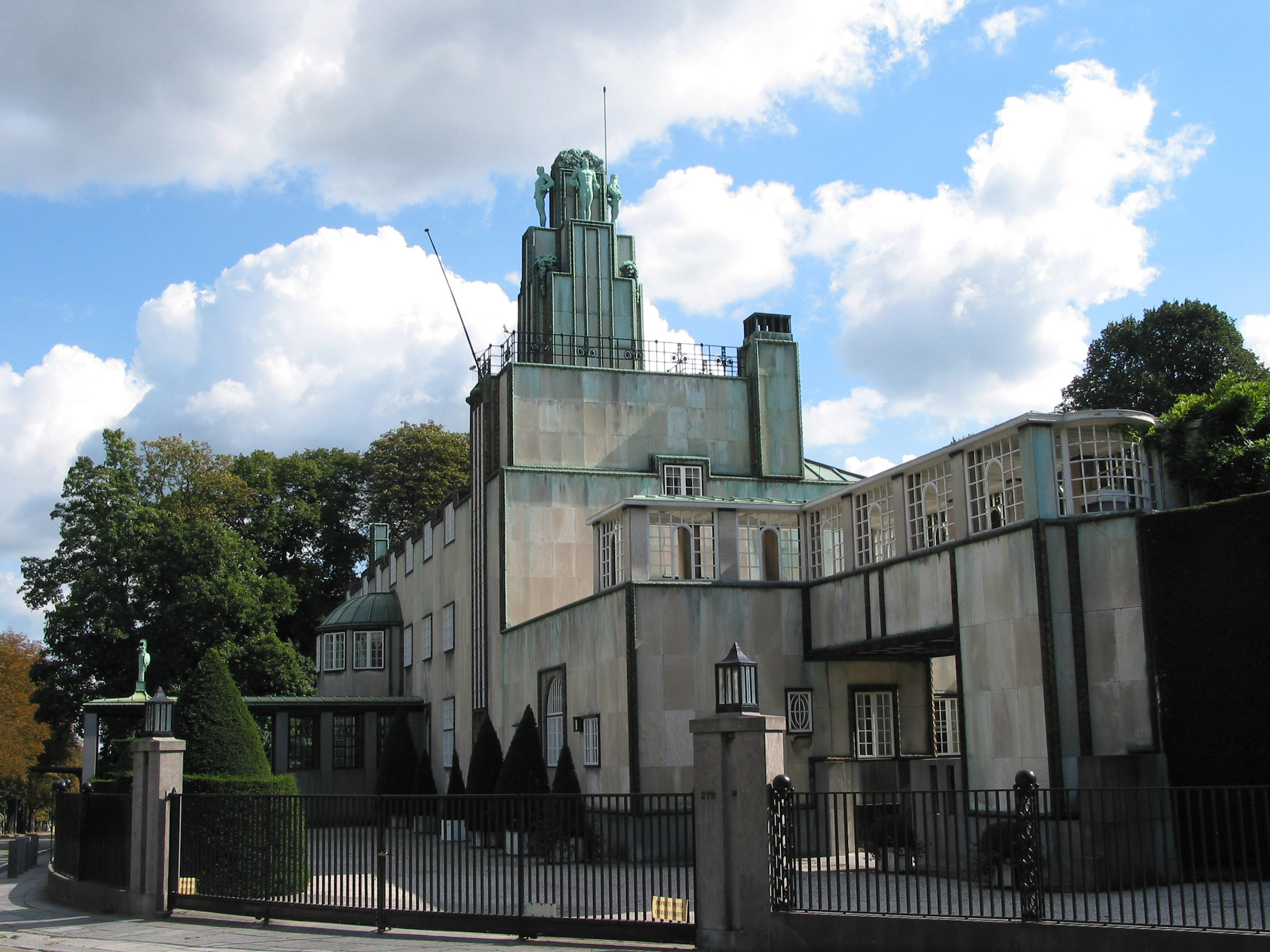
Stoclet Palace by Josef Hoffmann in Brussels (1905–1911)

=== Furniture ===
Secession architects often designed furniture to accompany their architectural projects, along with carpets, lamps, wallpaper, and even bathroom fixtures and even towels. The furniture presented by the Secession at the 1900 Paris Universal Exposition (1900) was particularly praised, and won international attention for its creators, including Else Unger and Emilio Zago.

Later in the movement, in 1902, the architect Otto Wagner designed chairs using modern materials, including aluminum, combined with wood, to match the architecture of his Austrian Postal Savings Bank building. In 1905 Josef Hoffmann produced an adjustable-backed chair which reflected the more geometric forms of the late Secession.

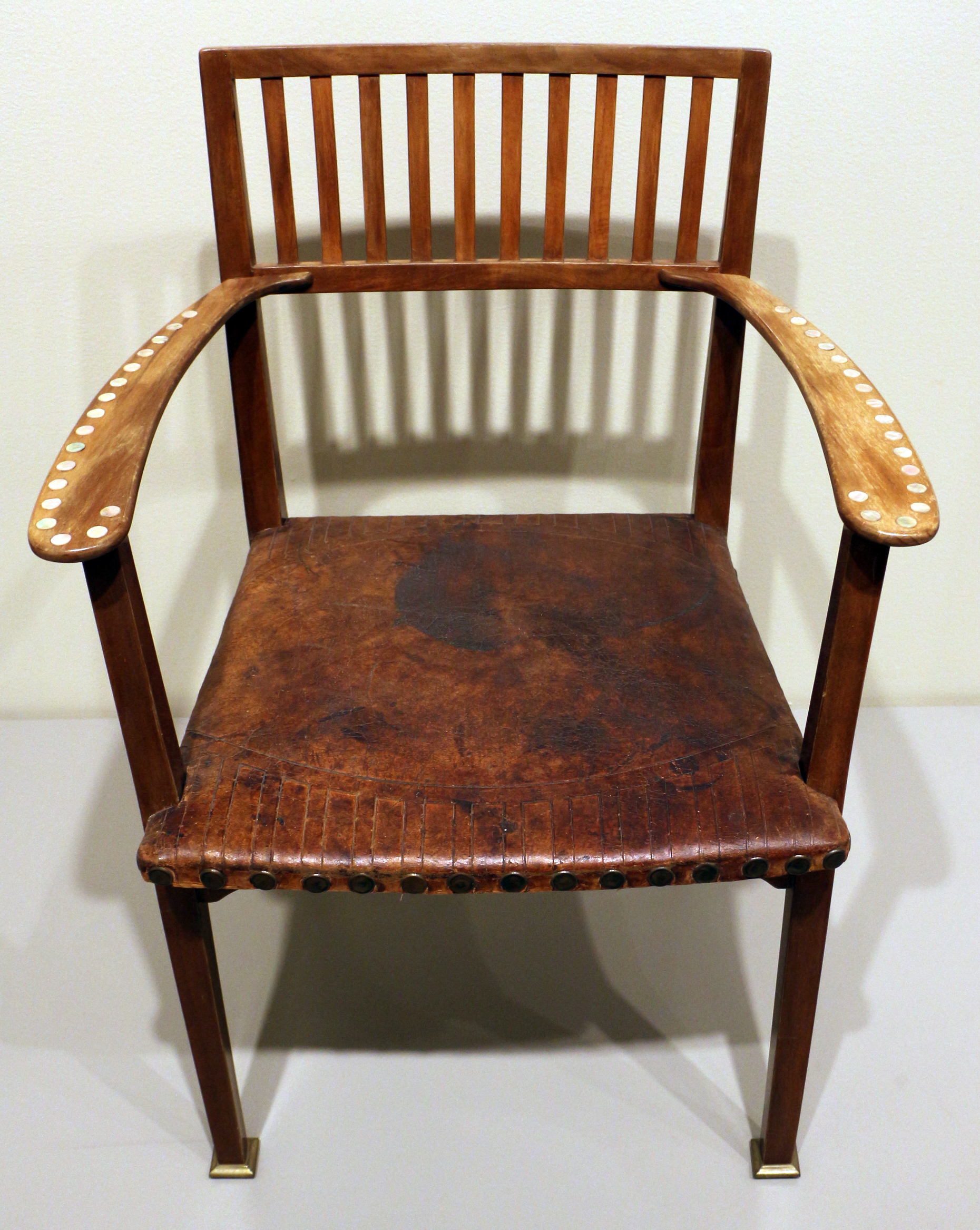
Armchair by Otto Wagner (1898–99)

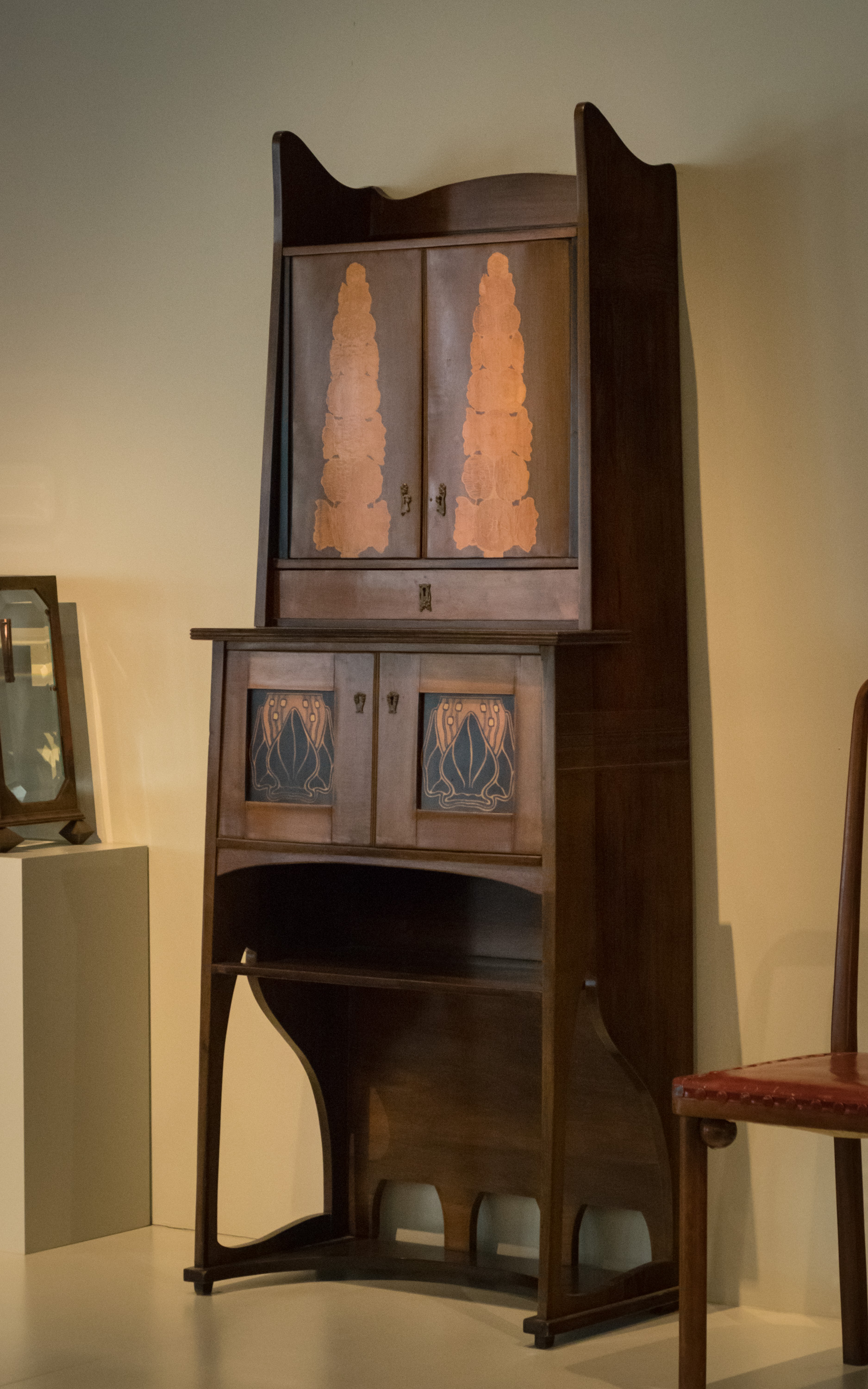
Cabinet by Joseph Maria Olbrich, of maple, fruitwood, ebony and brass (c. 1900), Los Angeles County Museum of Art

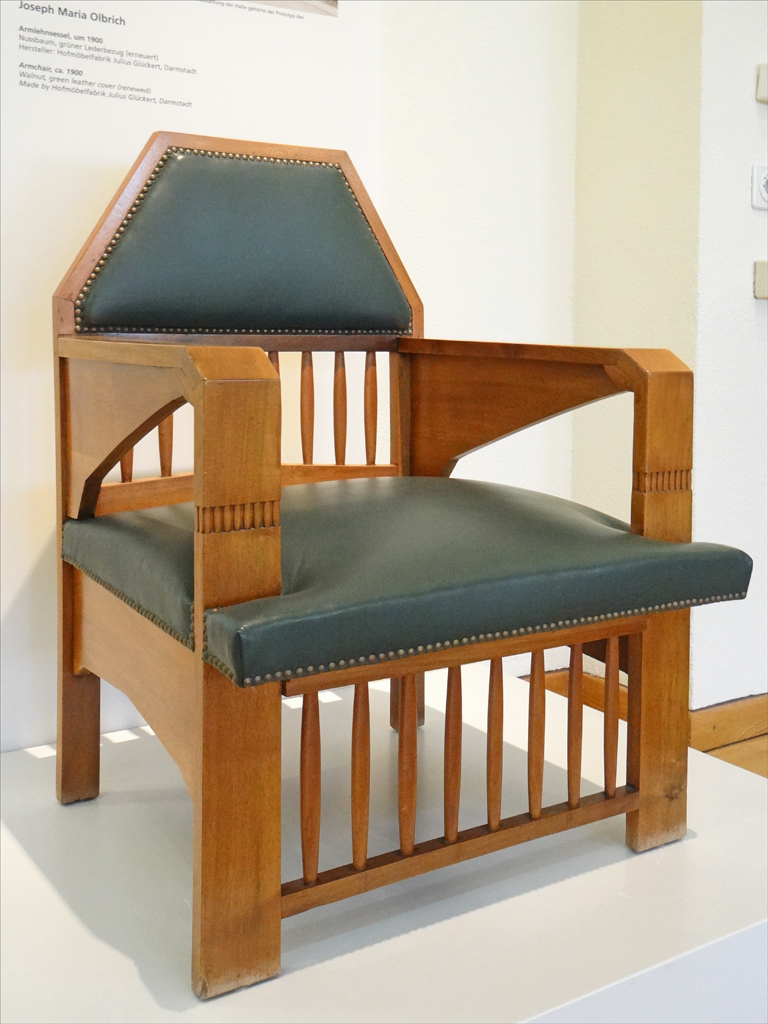
Armchair by Joseph Maria Olbrich made for the Darmstadt Artists' Colony (1900)

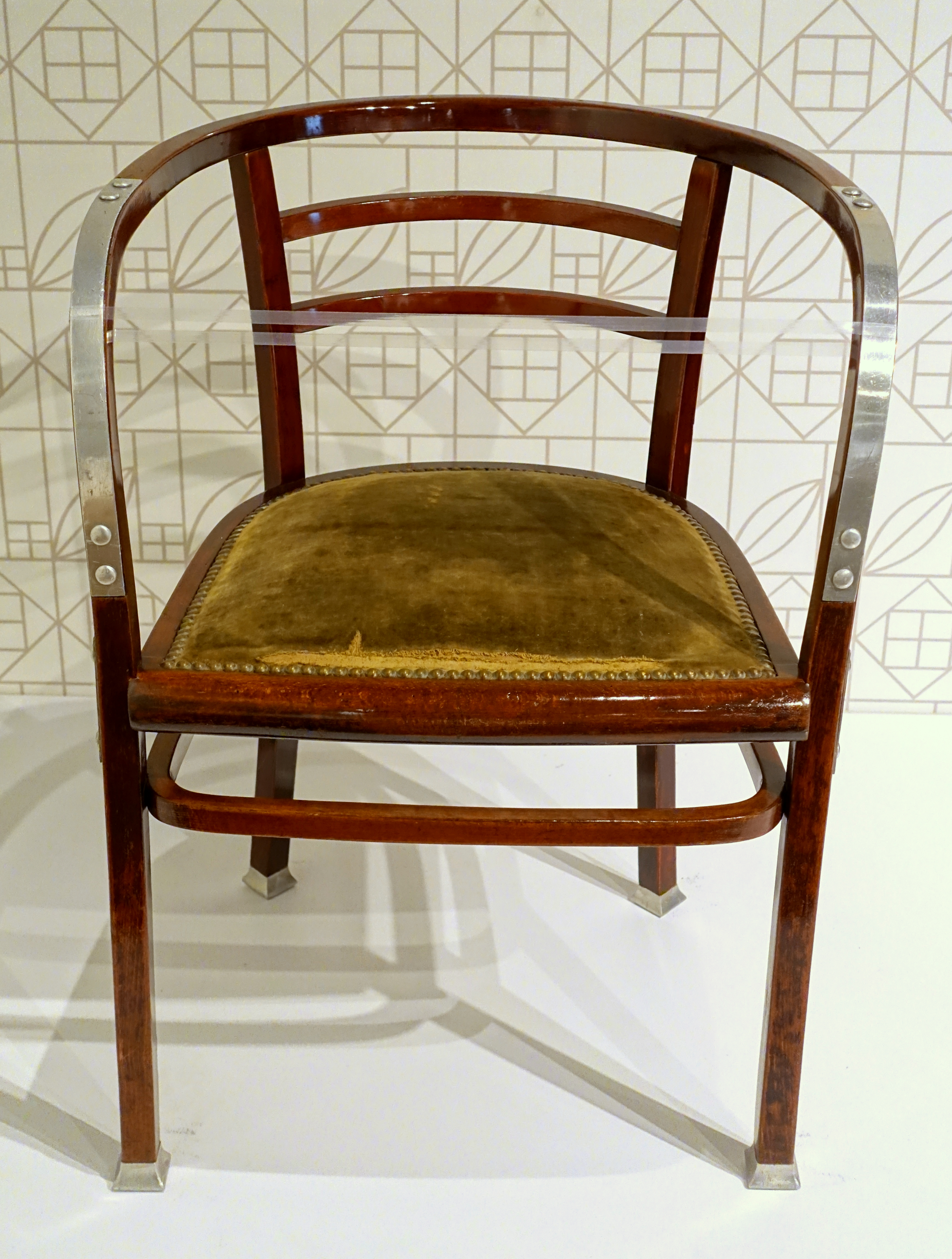
Otto Wagner, Armchair of beechwood, aluminum, and cane under the upholstery (1905–06), Montreal Museum of Fine Arts

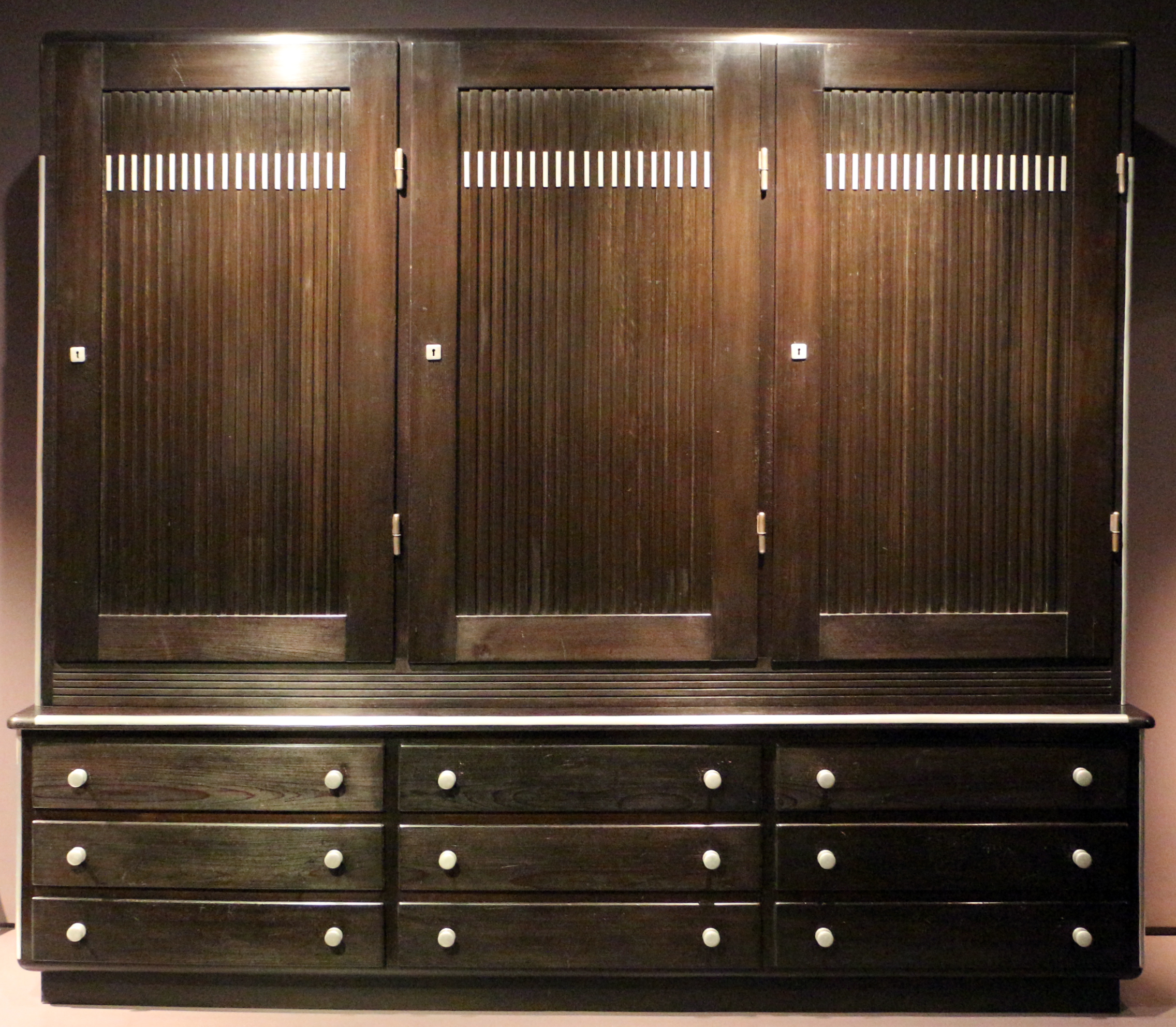
Cabinet made for the offices of the newspaper Die Zeit, Otto Wagner, (1902)

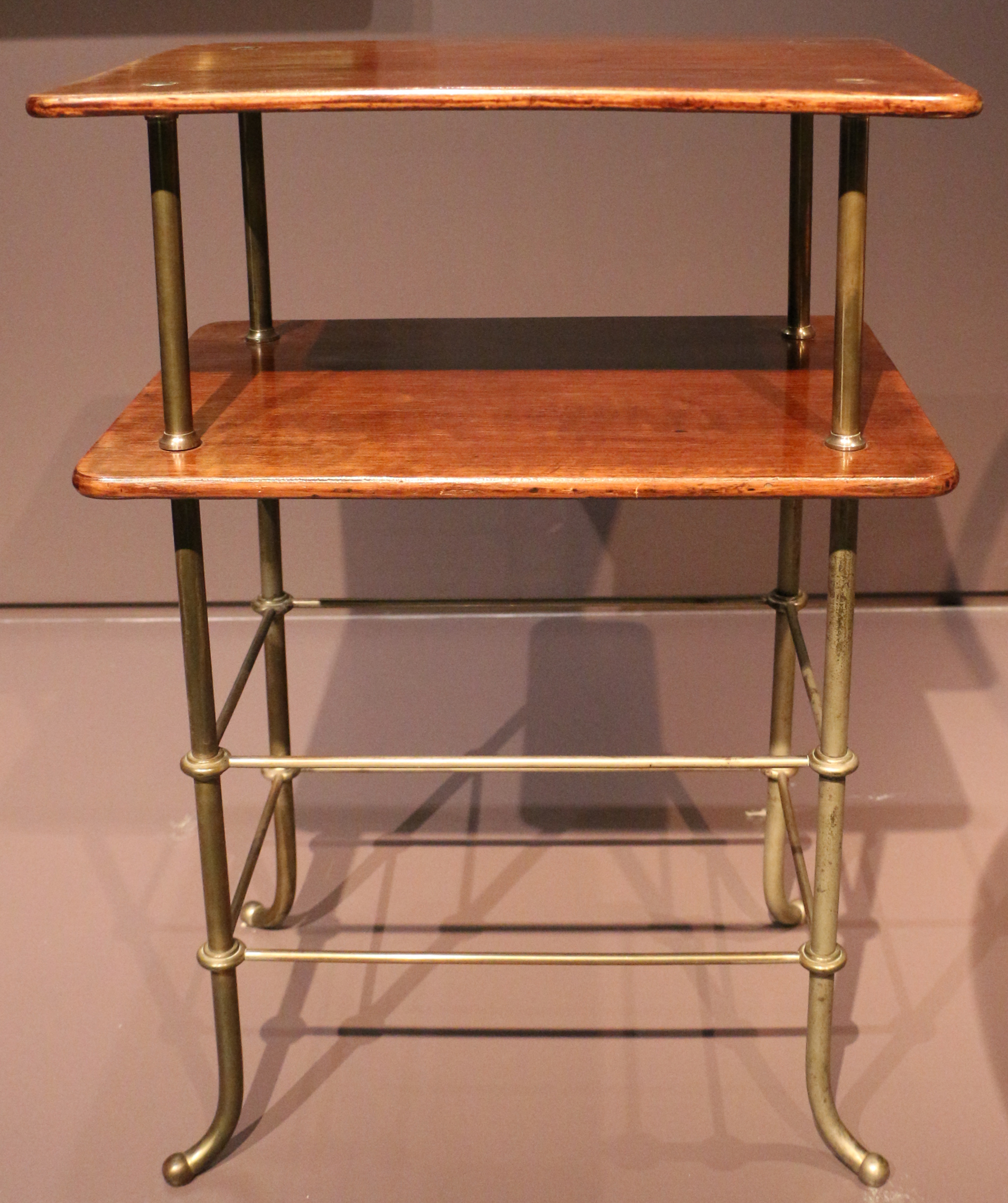
Wagner, Otto, Portable table made for Wagner's villa (1904)

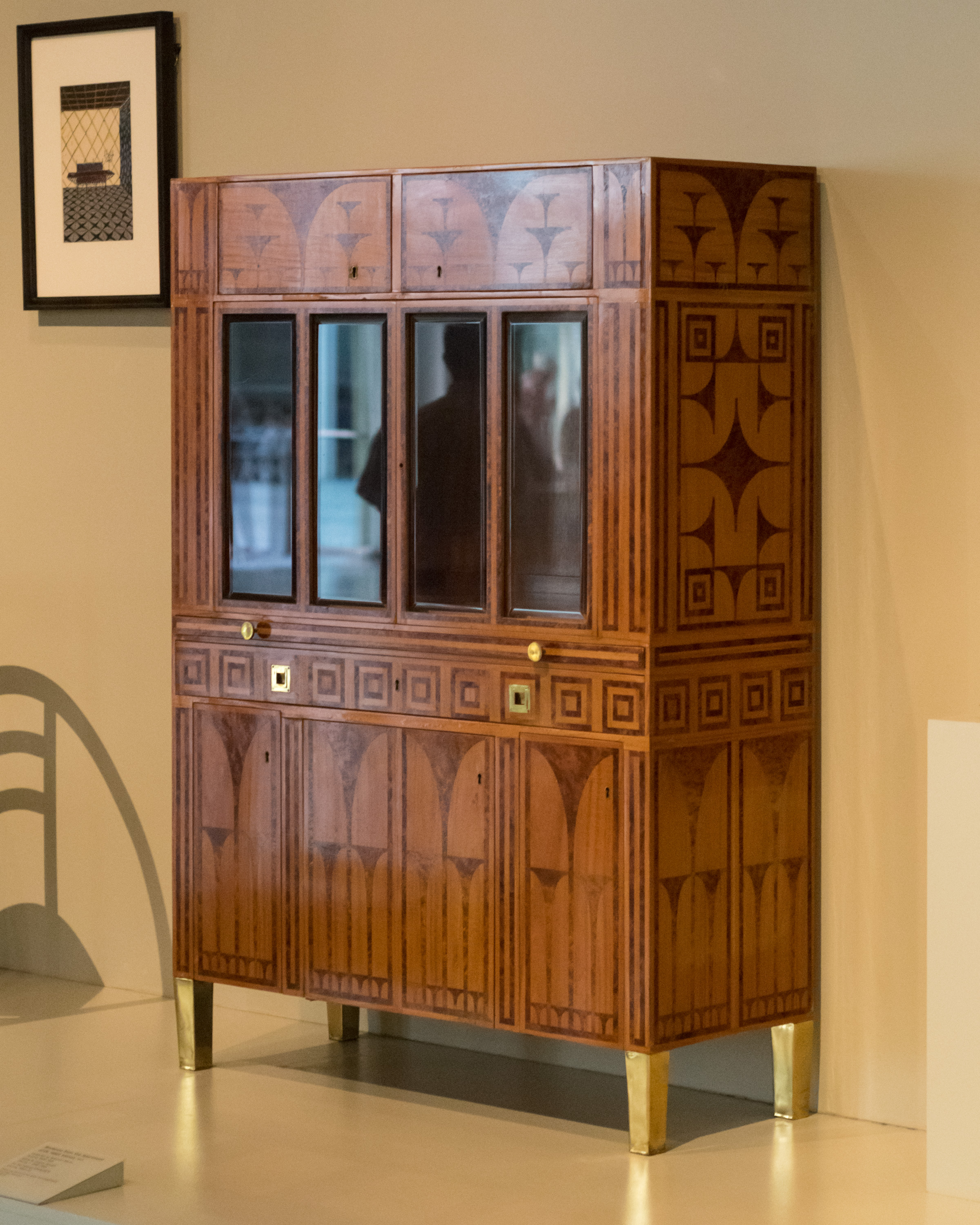
Bookcase by Koloman Moser (1902), Los Angeles County Museum of Art

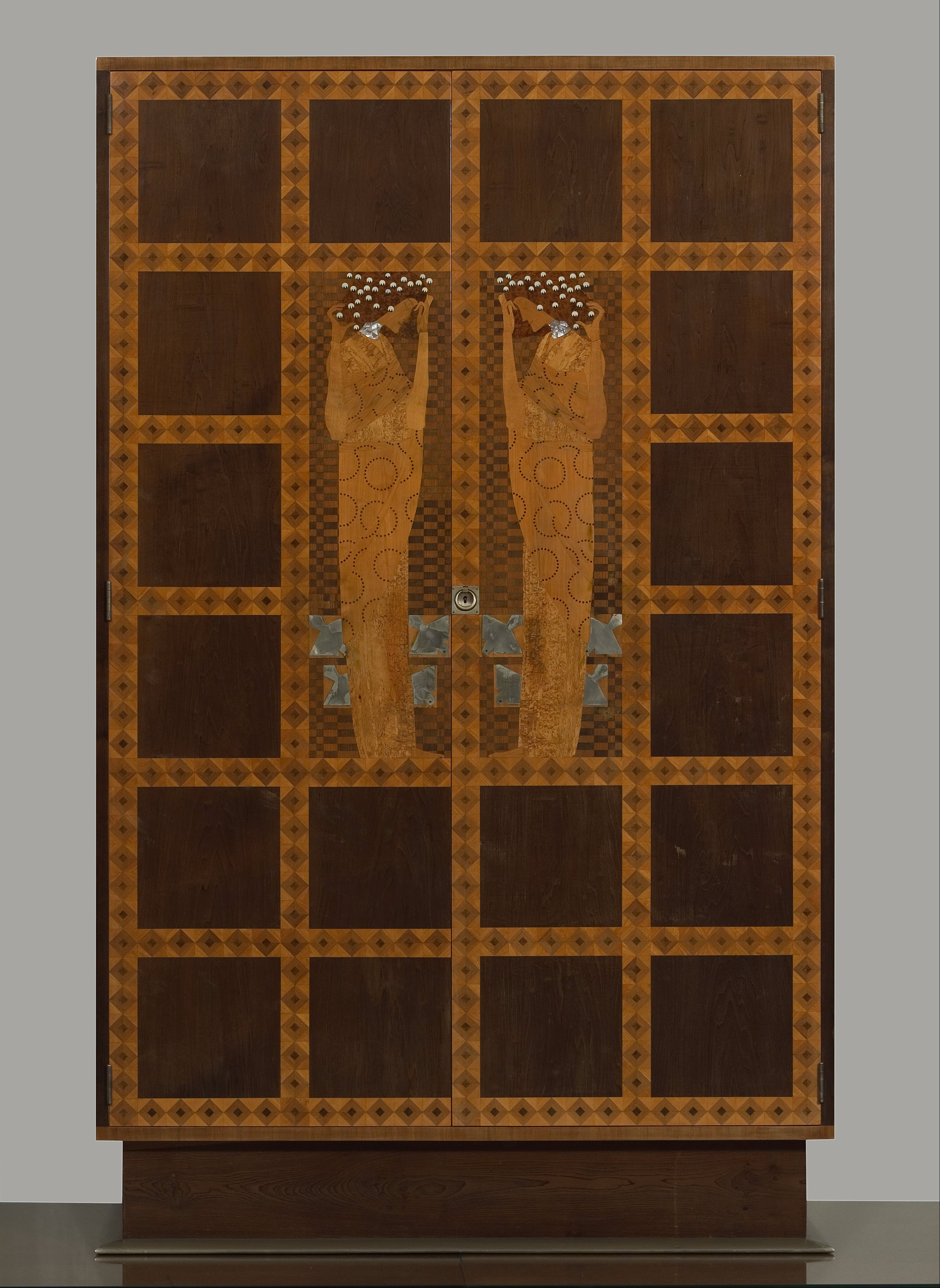
Inlaid Armoire by Koloman Moser (1903), Leopold Museum

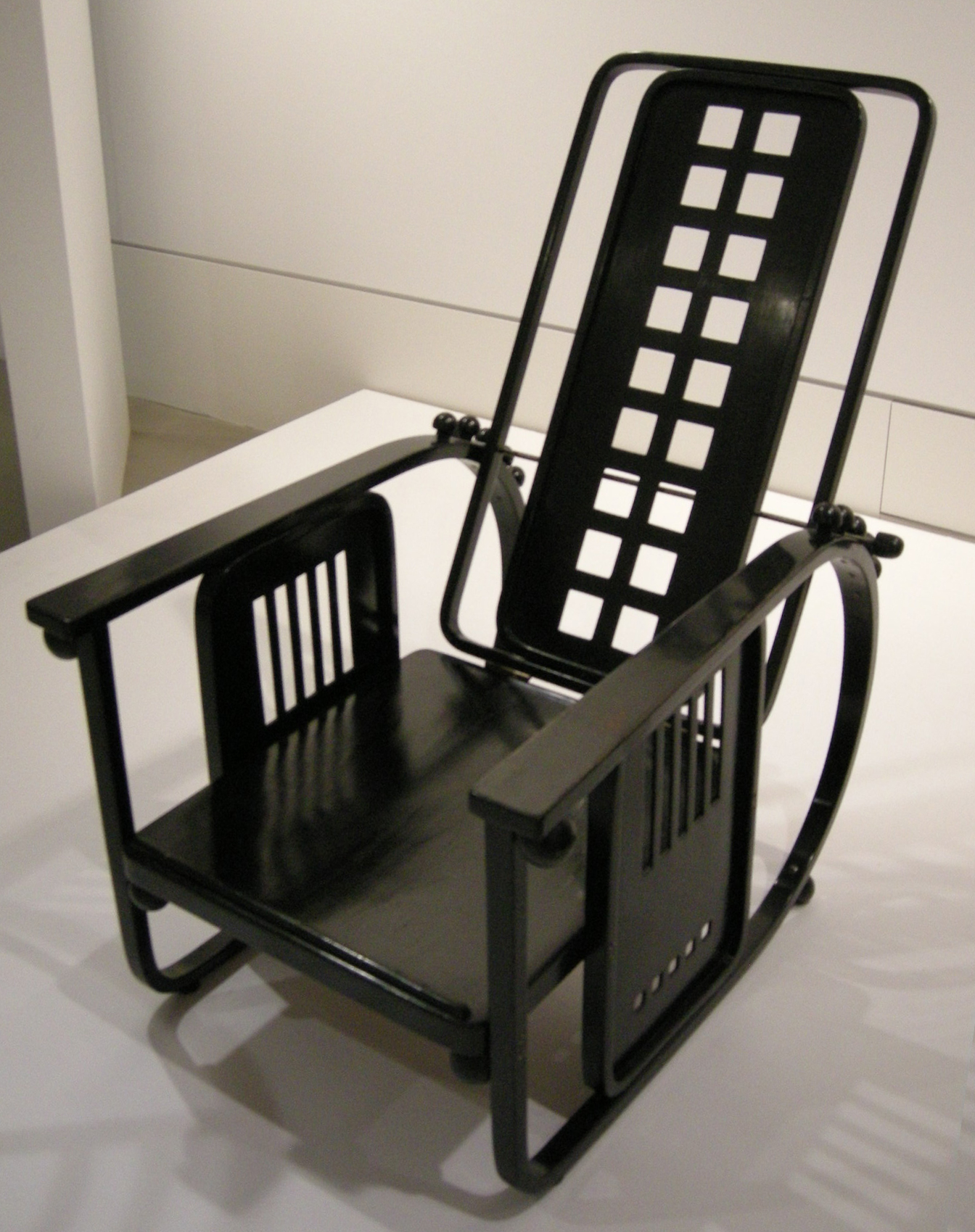
Adjustable-back chair Model 670 "Sitzmaschine" by Josef Hoffmann (1905)

=== Glass ===
Glass, particularly stained glass windows, played a significant part in the Vienna Secession. Leopold Forstner was in important artist in this domain, working closely with Otto Wagner and other architects. He designed the windows for the Austrian Postal Savings Bank, one of the landmarks of the Vienna Secession style, and also for the St. Charles Borromeo Cemetery Church, the most notable of Vienna Secession churches.

Another notable figure in Secession glass art was Johann Loetz Witwe, who made a striking series of iridescent vases which won a gold medal at the 1900 Paris Exposition.

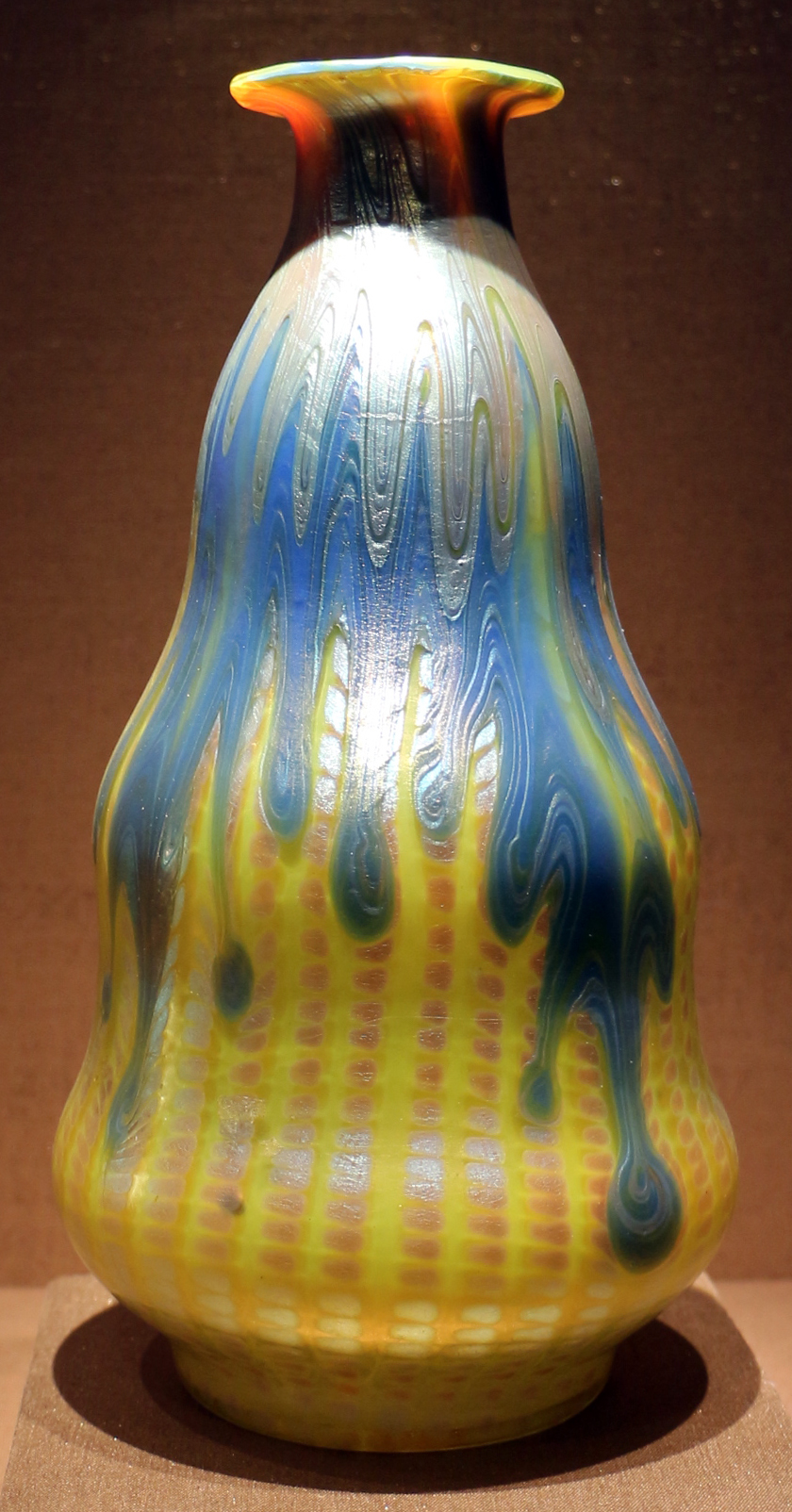
Vase by Johann Loetz Witwe (1900)

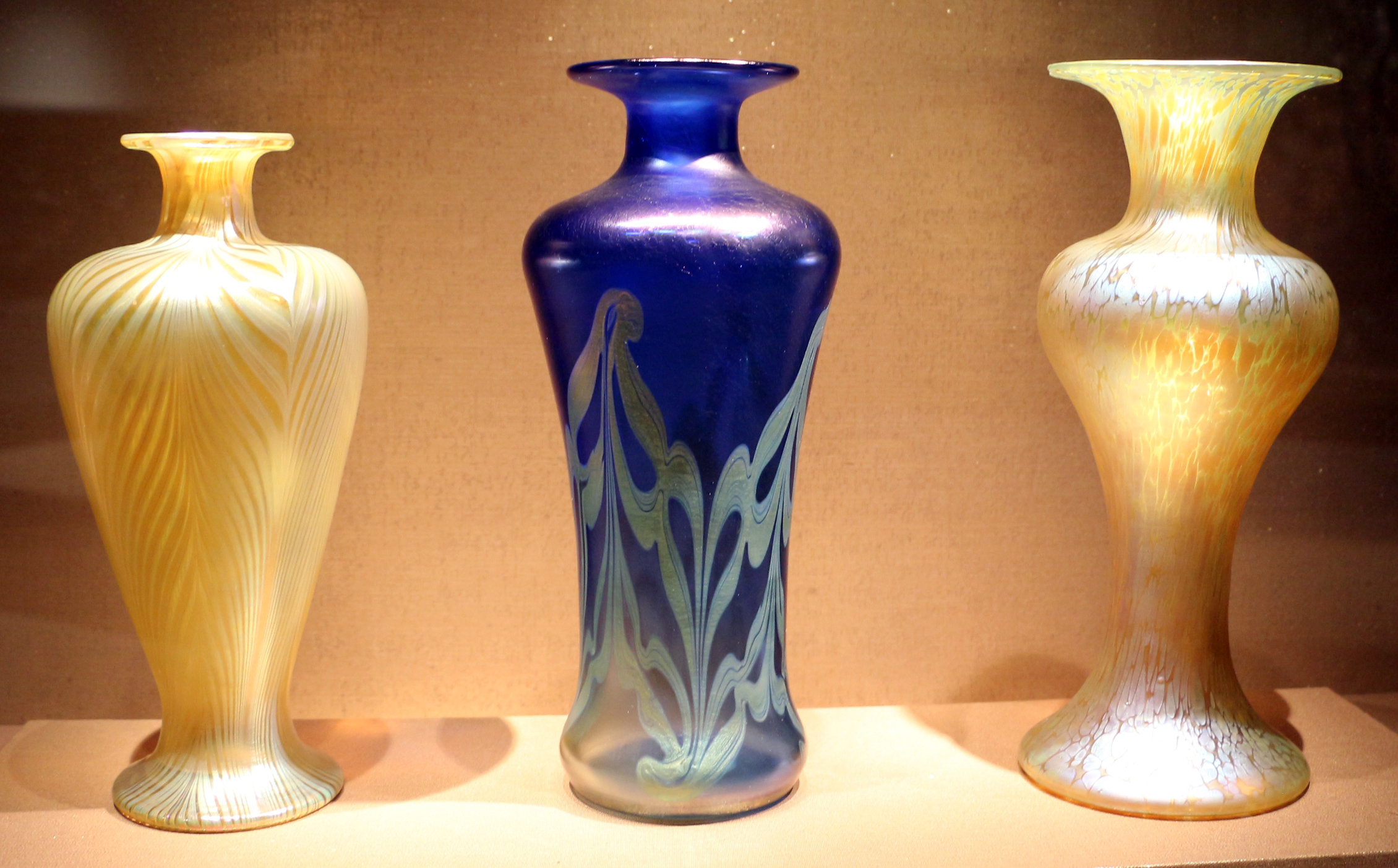
Iridescent vases by Johann Loetz Witwe (1900)

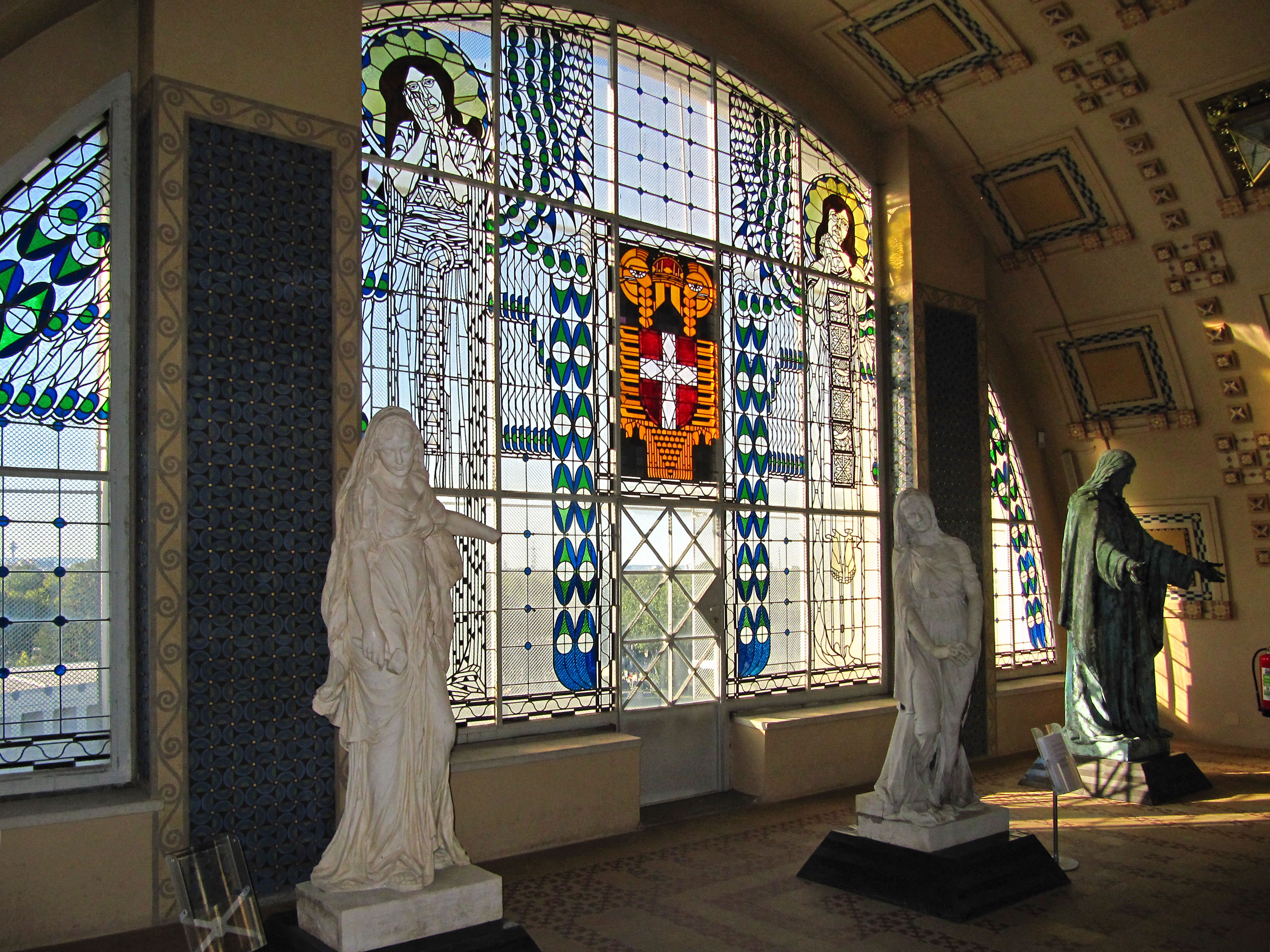
Stained glass window of St. Charles Borromeo Cemetery Church by Leopold Forstner (1908–1911)

=== Ceramics ===
Mosaics of ceramic tiles were another important element of the Vienna Secession style. They were used to decorate both building facades and interiors. Otto Wagner used them to decorate the Majolika House, where they served both as decoration and for a practical purpose; the facade could be efficiently cleaned with the use of fire hoses.

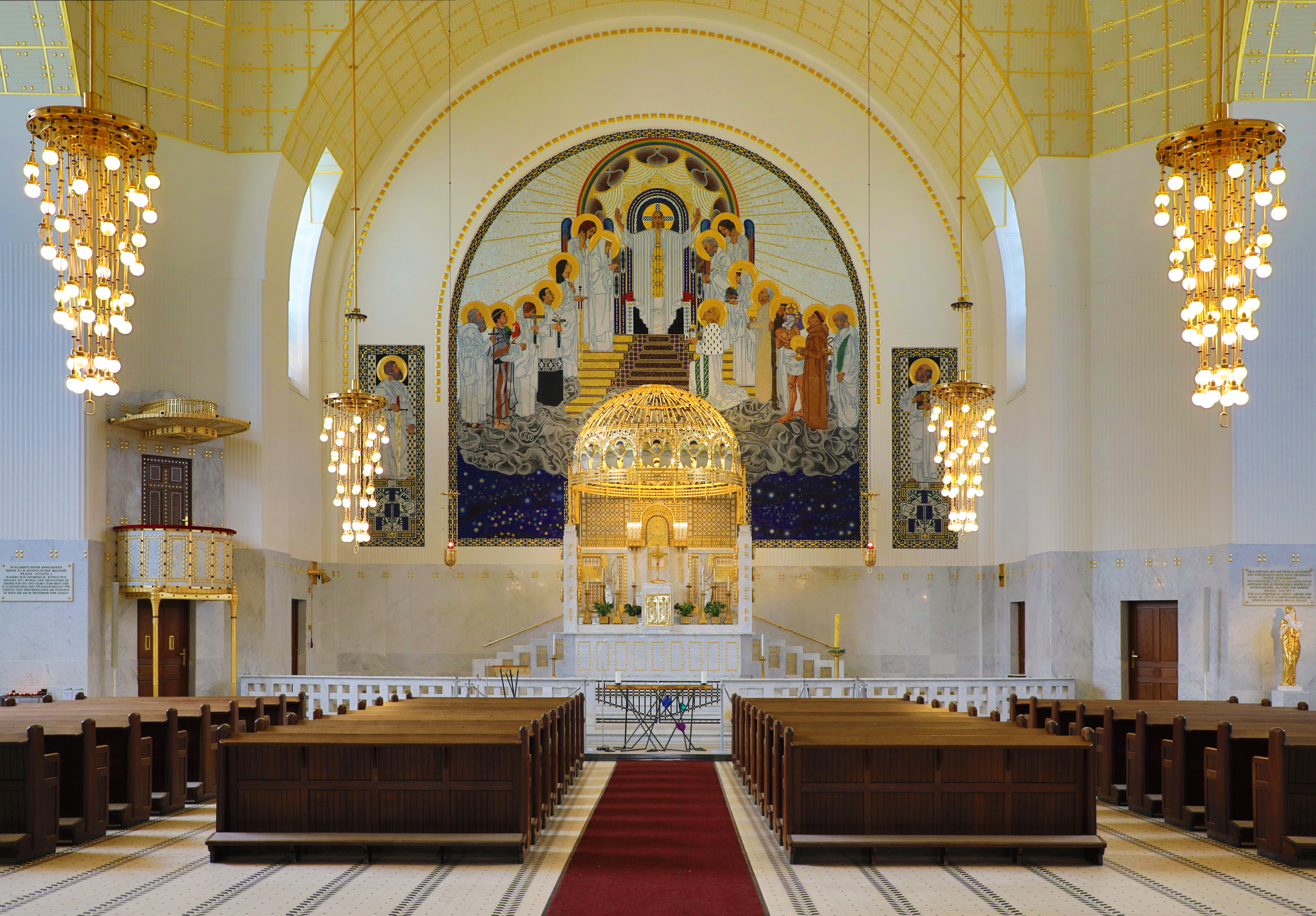
Altar wall mosaics of Church of St. Leopold by Leopold Forstner

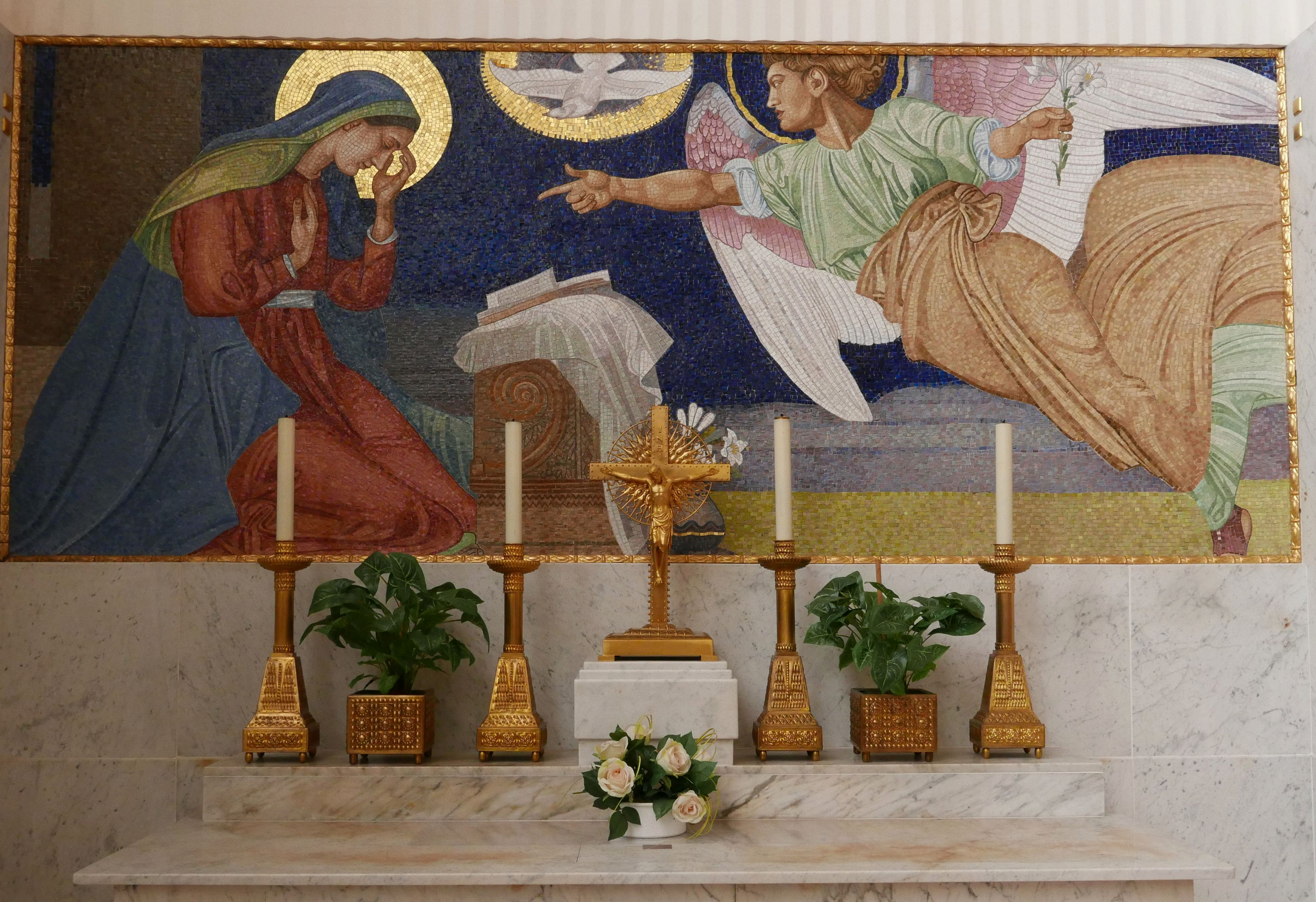
Altar mosaics of Church of St. Leopold by Bruno Mayer (1903–1907)

=== Other genres ===
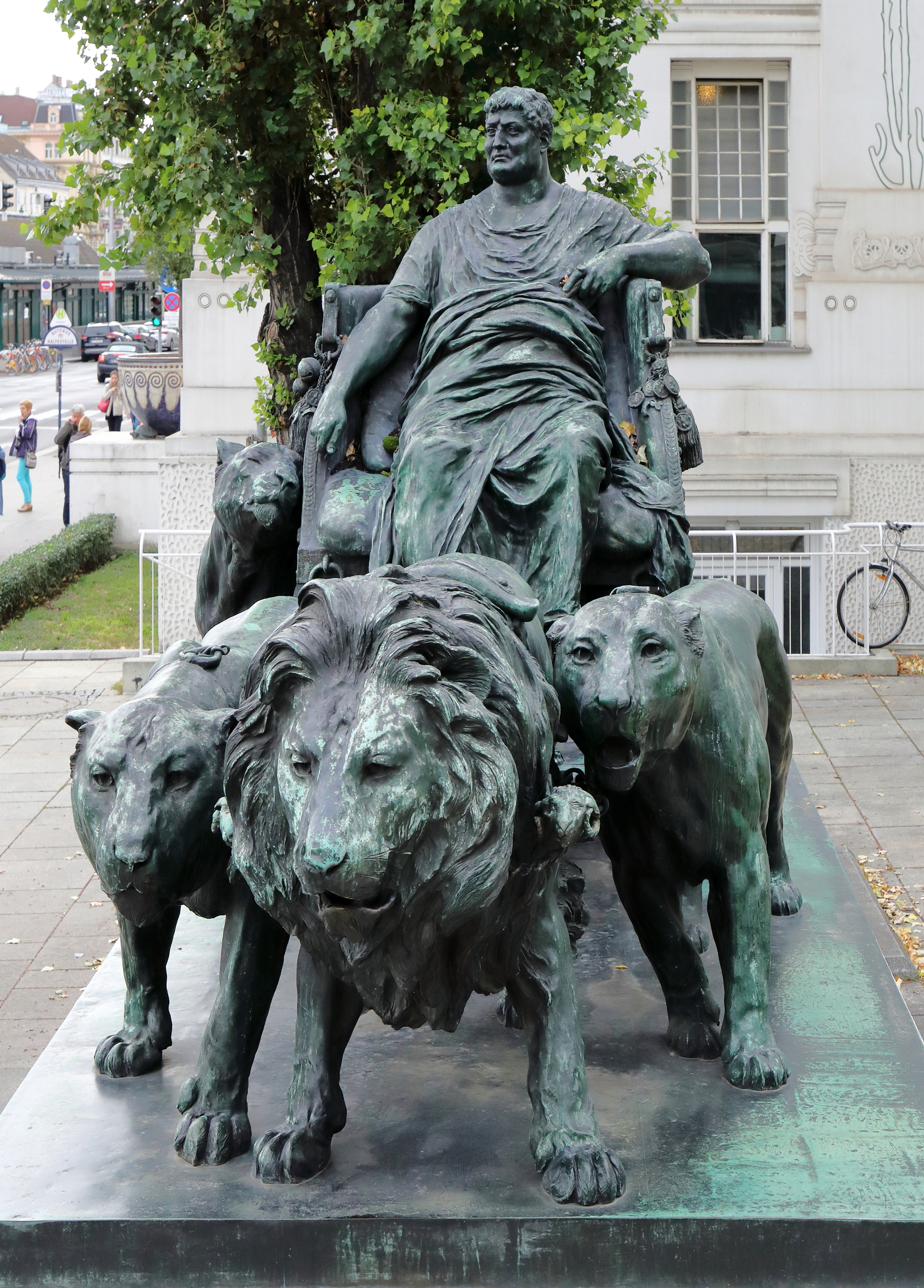
The monument to Mark Antony by Arthur Strasser (1899)

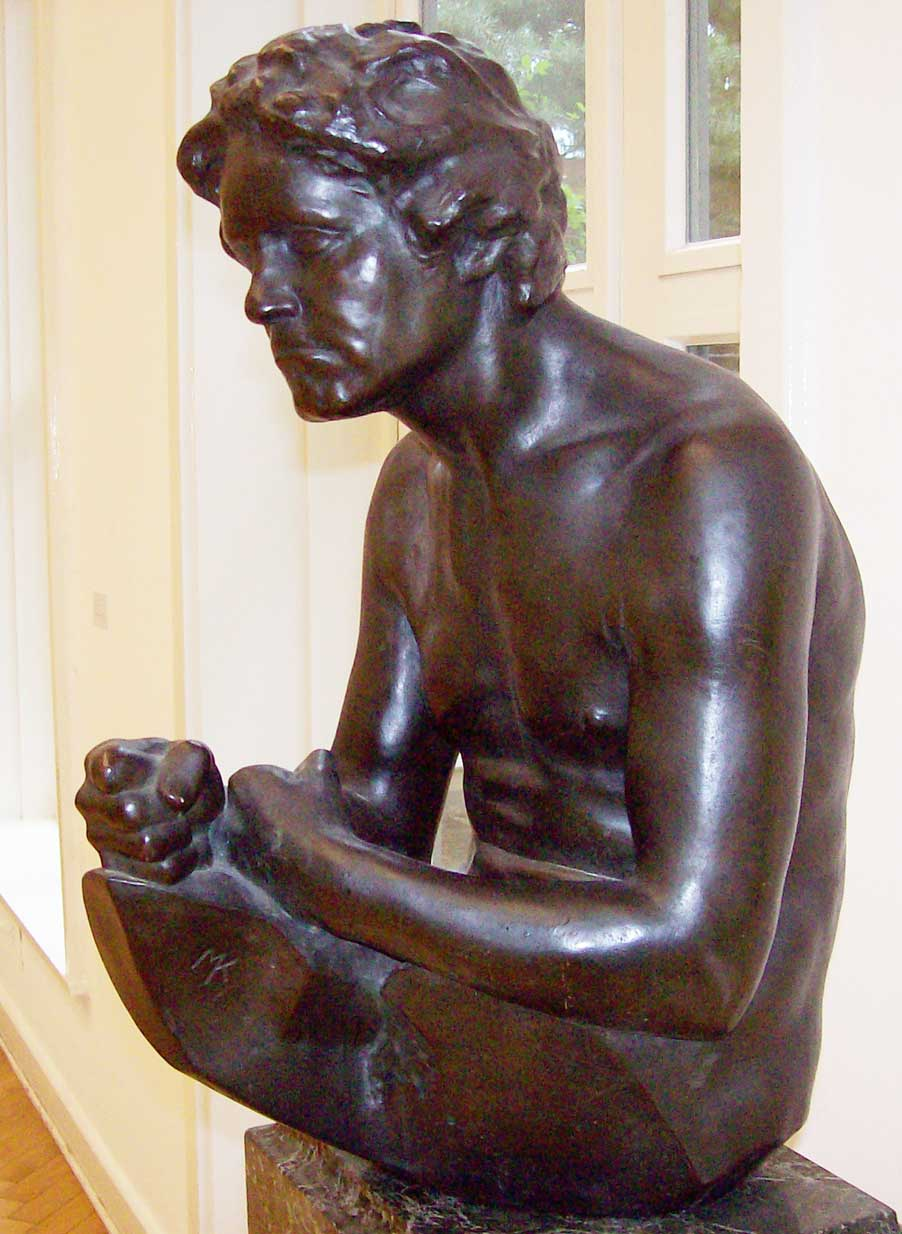
Beethoven torso statue by Max Klinger for XIV Secession exhibition (1902)

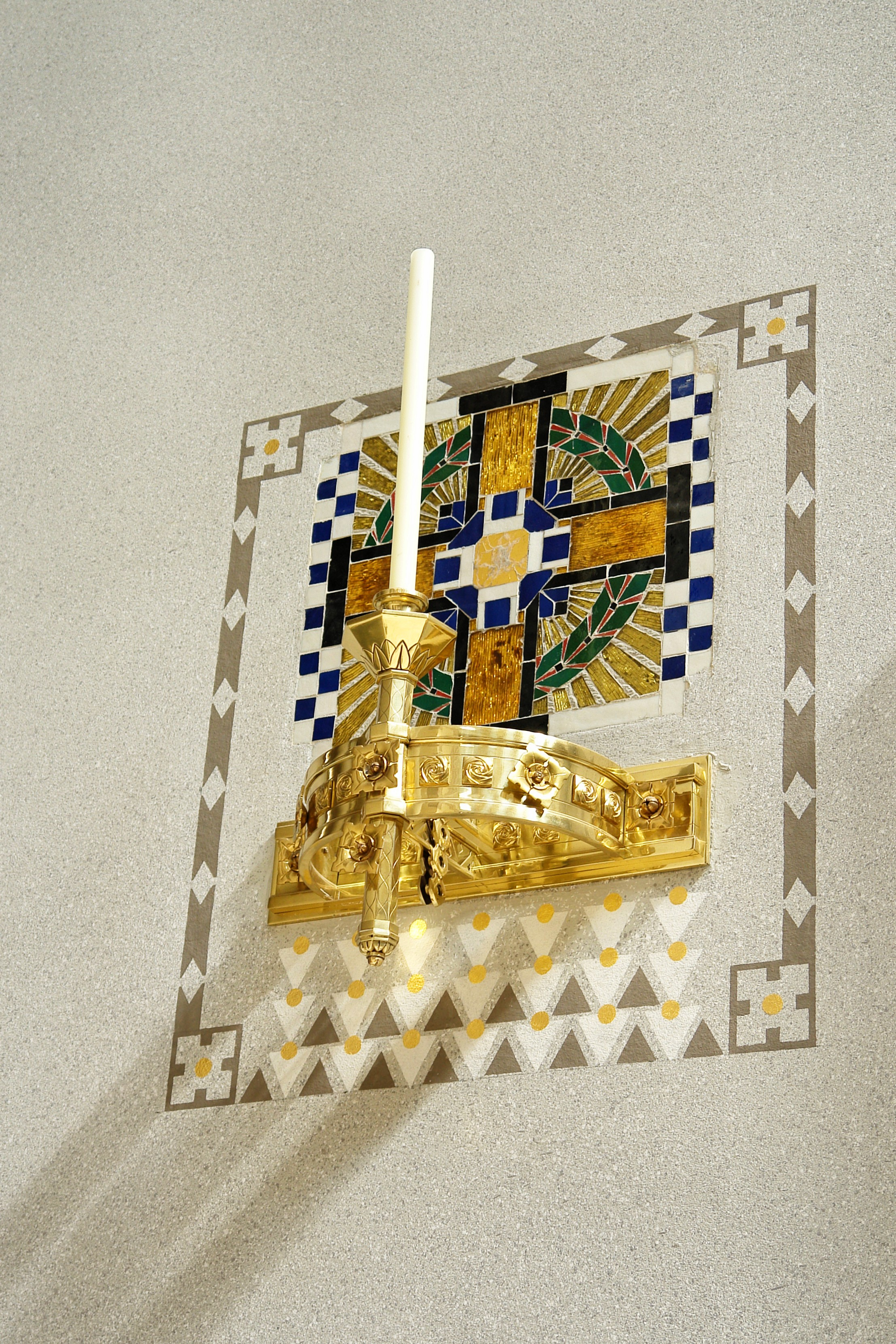
A lamp in St. Charles Borromeo Cemetery Church

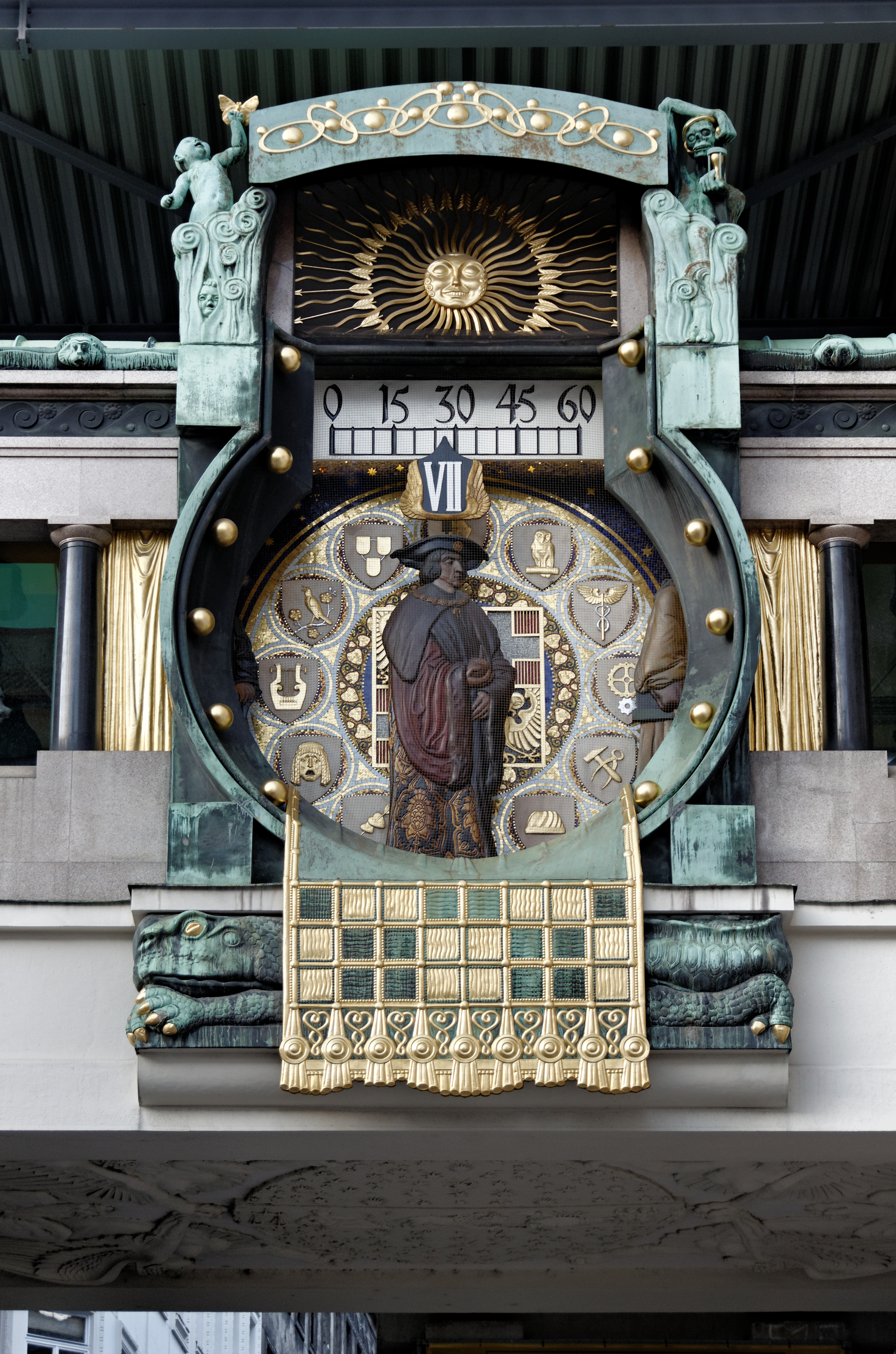
Ankeruhr clock by Franz Matsch (1911–1914)

== Influence ==
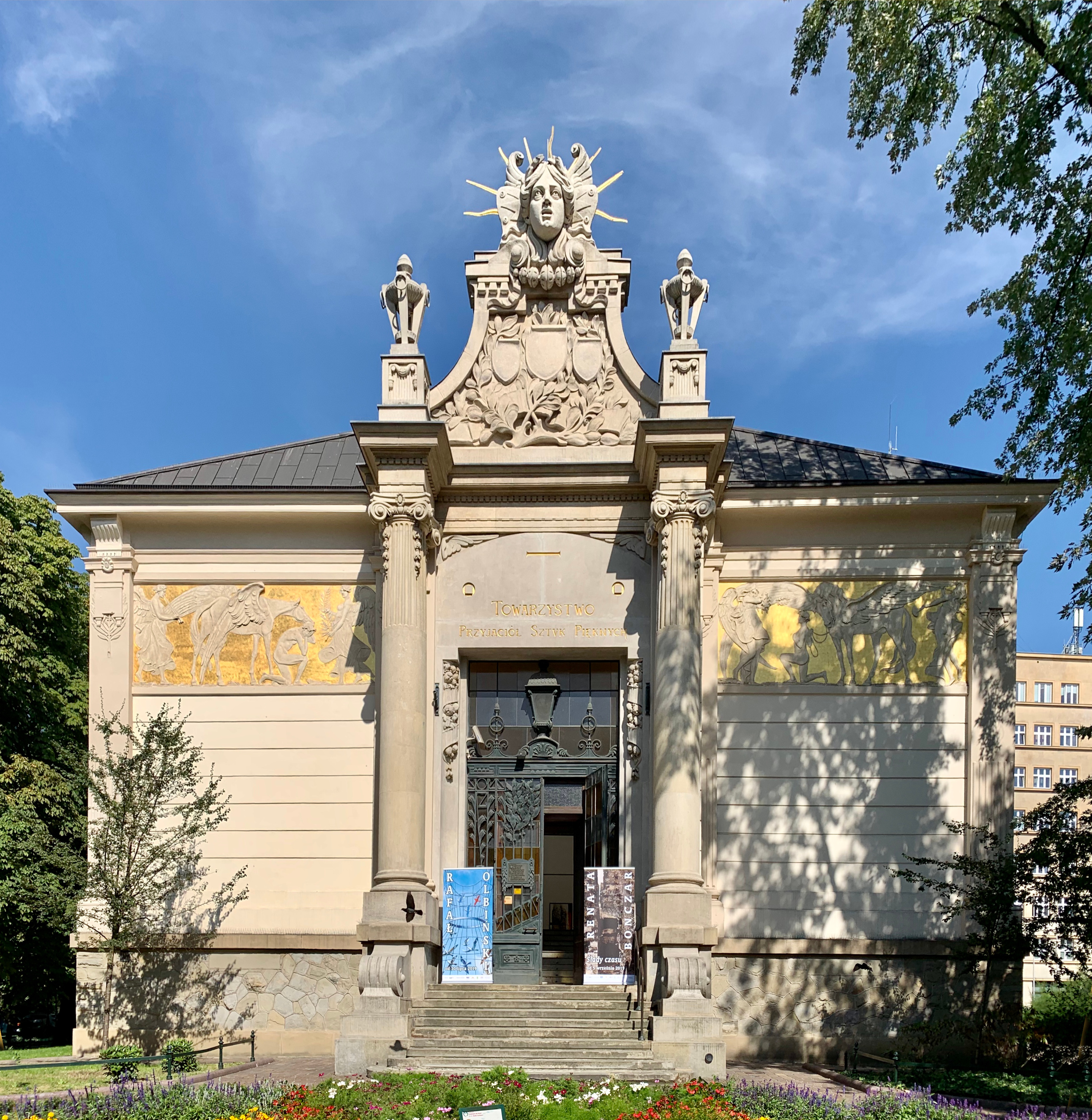
Palace of Art, also known as "Secession", of the Kraków Society of Friends of Fine Arts, in Kraków Old Town

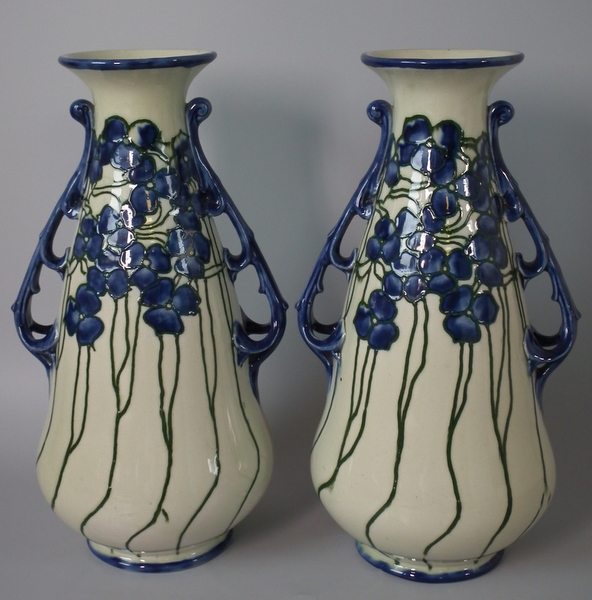
Secessionist ware vases by Mintons

Art Nouveau is named after Vienna Secession in languages of former Austro-Hungary: Slovene: secesija, Hungarian: szecesszió, Czech: secese, Slovak: secesia, Polish: secesja, Serbian сецесија, Croatian secesija. Vienna Secession also influenced the Polish movement Młoda Polska (Young Poland), that was also inclusive of other than Art Nouveau artistic styles and encompassed a broader approach to art, literature, and lifestyle.

Vienna Secession influenced not only movements but also particular architects, e.g. Russian Illarion Ivanov-Schitz who created his own unique style on its base.

From the mid-1890s onwards, Mintons in England made major contributions to Art Nouveau ceramics, many designed by Marc-Louis Solon's son Leon Solon and his colleague John Wadsworth. Leon Solon was hired by Mintons after his work was published in the hugely influential design magazine The Studio and he worked for the company from 1895 to 1905, including a brief stint as Art Director. Solon introduced designs influenced by the Vienna Secession, and a range in earthenware made from about 1901 to 1916 was branded as "Secessionist Ware". It was made mostly using industrial techniques that kept it relatively cheap, and was aimed at a broad market. The range concentrated on items bought singly or in pairs, such as jugs or vases, rather than full table services.

== Commemoration ==
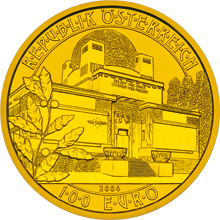
The Secession coin

The Secession movement was selected as the theme for an Austrian commemorative coin: the €100 Secession commemorative coin minted on 10 November 2004.

On the obverse side there is a view of the Secession exhibition hall in Vienna. The reverse side features a small portion of the Beethoven Frieze by Gustav Klimt. The extract from the painting features three figures: a knight in armour representing Armed Strength, one woman in the background symbolising Ambition and holding up a wreath of victory, and a second woman representing Sympathy with lowered head and clasped hands.

On the obverse side of the Austrian €50 cent coin, the Vienna Secession Building figures within a circle, symbolising the birth of the movement and a new age in the country.

== Other Secession artists ==
Artists of Vienna Secession not mentioned above are:

- Teodor Axentowicz
- Renate Bertlmann
- Adolf Michael Boehm
- Julian Fałat
- Wlastimil Hofman
- Maximilian Liebenwein
- Jacek Malczewski
- Julius Mayreder
- Emilie Mediz-Pelikan
- Józef Mehoffer
- Carl Moll
- Maximilian Pirner
- Kazimierz Pochwalski
- Teresa Feoderovna Ries
- Jan Stanisławski
- Wacław Szymanowski
- Wojciech Weiss
- Leon Wyczółkowski
- Stanisław Wyspiański
- Karl Hagenauer
- Broncia Koller-Pinell
- Wilhelm Schlist
- Benjamin Davis

Some artists from other cities and countries, like Max Liebermann from Berlin or Auguste Rodin and Eugène Grasset from Paris were made corresponding members.

== See also ==
- Secession (art)
- Facing the Modern: The Portrait in Vienna 1900 – the exhibition in National Gallery, London, 2013,
- Art Nouveau
- Art Nouveau in Poland
- Art Nouveau glass art
- Arts and Crafts movement

== Bibliography ==
- Arnanson, Harvard H. "History of Modern Art". Ed. Daniel Wheeler. 3rd ed. Englewood Cliffs, NJ: Prentice Hall, Inc, 1986. ISBN 978-0-13-390360-7.
- Borsi, Franco, and Ezio Godoli. "Vienna 1900 Architecture and Design". New York: Rizzoli International Publications, Inc, 1986. ISBN 978-0-8478-0616-4
- "Architecture in Austria in the 20th and 21st Centuries". Ed. Gudrun Hausegger. Basel, SW: Birkhauser, 2006. ISBN 978-3-7643-7694-9
- Fahr-Becker, Gabriele (2015). L'Art Nouveau (in French). H.F. Ullmann. ISBN 978-3-8480-0857-5.
- Kolja Kramer: Carabin & Die Wiener Secession – Die Rolle des Delegierten im Beziehungsnetz der Wiener Secession bei der Ankunft des französischen Impressionismus und der französischen Avantgarde in Wien um 1900, Verlag BoD, Norderstedt 2024, 404 pages. ISBN 978-3-7583-7386-2.
- Metzger, Rainer (2018). Vienne – des Années 1900 (in French). Cologne: Taschen. ISBN 978-3-8365-6704-6.
- O'Connor, Anne-Marie (2012). The Lady in Gold, The Extraordinary Tale of Gustav Klimt's Masterpiece, Portrait of Adele Bloch-Bauer, Alfred A. Knopf, New York, ISBN 0-307-26564-1.
- Kathrin Romberg (ed.): Maurizio Cattelan. Text by Francesco Bonami, Wiener Secession, Wien. ISBN 3-900803-87-0
- Schorske, Carl E. "Gustav Klimt: Painting and the Crisis of the Liberal Ego" in Fin-de-Siècle Vienna: Politics and Culture. Vintage Books, 1981. ISBN 978-0-394-74478-0
- Sarnitz, August (2016). Josef Hoffmann, L'univers de la beauté (in French). Cologne: Taschen. ISBN 978-3-8365-5038-3.
- Sarnitz, August (2018). Otto Wagner (in French). Cologne: Taschen. ISBN 978-3-8365-6432-8.
- Sekler, Eduard F. "Josef Hoffmann The Architectural Work". Princeton, NJ: Princeton UP, 1985. ISBN 978-0-691-06572-4
- Topp, Leslie. "Architecture and truth in fin-de-siecle vienna". Cambridge, UK: Cambridge UP, 2004. ISBN 978-0-521-82275-6
