= St. Charles Borromeo Cemetery Church =

Cemetery church in Vienna

Coordinates: 48°09′02″N 16°26′16″E

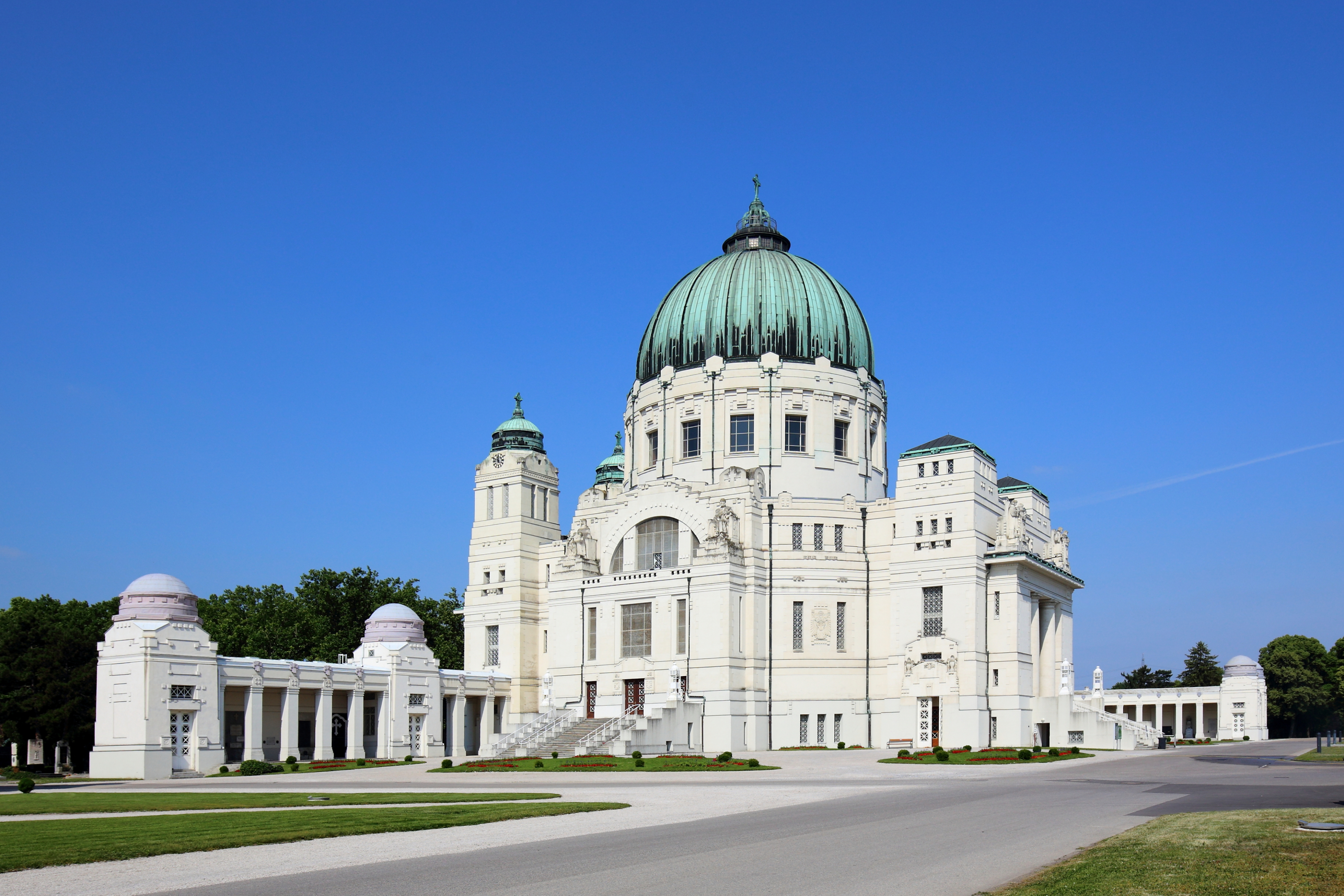
St. Charles Borromeo Cemetery Church

St. Charles Borromeo Cemetery Church (German: Friedhofskirche zum heiligen Karl Borromäus) is a Roman Catholic church in the Vienna Central Cemetery in the 11th district, Simmering. It was constructed from 1908 to 1911 to designs by the architect Max Hegele. The church is a listed building.

The church is dedicated to Saint Charles Borromeo, archbishop of Milan from 1564 to 1584 and a cardinal.

== See also ==
- St. Charles Church, Vienna
