= Postbank =

Postbank or Post bank may refer to:

== Postal savings systems ==
(alphabetical by country)

- Bulgarian Postbank, a Bulgarian retail bank
- Chunghwa Post, a Taiwanese postal service that provides savings account services
- Deutsche Postbank, a German retail bank
- India Post Payments Bank, a financial services provider owned 100% by the Government of India
- BancoPosta, the Italian postal savings system that operates as a unit of Poste Italiane
- Japan Post Bank, a Japanese bank headquartered in Tokyo
- Kenya Post Office Savings Bank, s Kenyan bank headquartered in Nairobi
- La Banque postale, a French bank created in 2006 as a subsidiary of La Poste, the national postal service
- Postal Savings Bank of China, a Chinese retail bank
- Post Bank (Russia), a Russian bank created in 2016 as a joint venture between the VTB Group and Russian Post
- Post Bank of Iran, a bank in Iran established in 2006.
- Philippine Postal Savings Bank, a savings bank in the Philippines.
- Postbank (South Africa), a savings financial institution in South Africa; a division of the South African Post Office
- PostFinance, the financial services department of Swiss Post
- PostBank Uganda, a financial services provider owned 100% by the Government of Uganda
- Tanzania Postal Bank, a Tanzanian bank headquartered in Dar es Salaam

== Other uses ==
- Postbank N.V., a former Dutch bank, now part of the ING Group
- TT Hellenic Postbank, Greece; 1900-2013
- New TT Hellenic Postbank, Greece; founded 2013
- PostBank, a former New Zealand bank, now part of ANZ bank
- Postbank Ireland Limited, a joint venture of An Post and Fortis
- Austrian Postal Savings Bank, a modernist building in Vienna

== See also ==
- Postal Bank (disambiguation)
- Postal savings system
