= Postal Bank =

- Austrian Postal Savings Bank
- Croatian Postal Savings Bank
- Greek Postal Savings Bank
- India Post Payments Bank
- Israel Postal Bank
- Philippine Postal Savings Bank
- Postal Savings Bank of China
- Tanzania Postal Bank

== See also ==
- Postal savings system
- Postbank (disambiguation)
