= Linke Wienzeile Buildings =

Group of buildings in Vienna, Austria

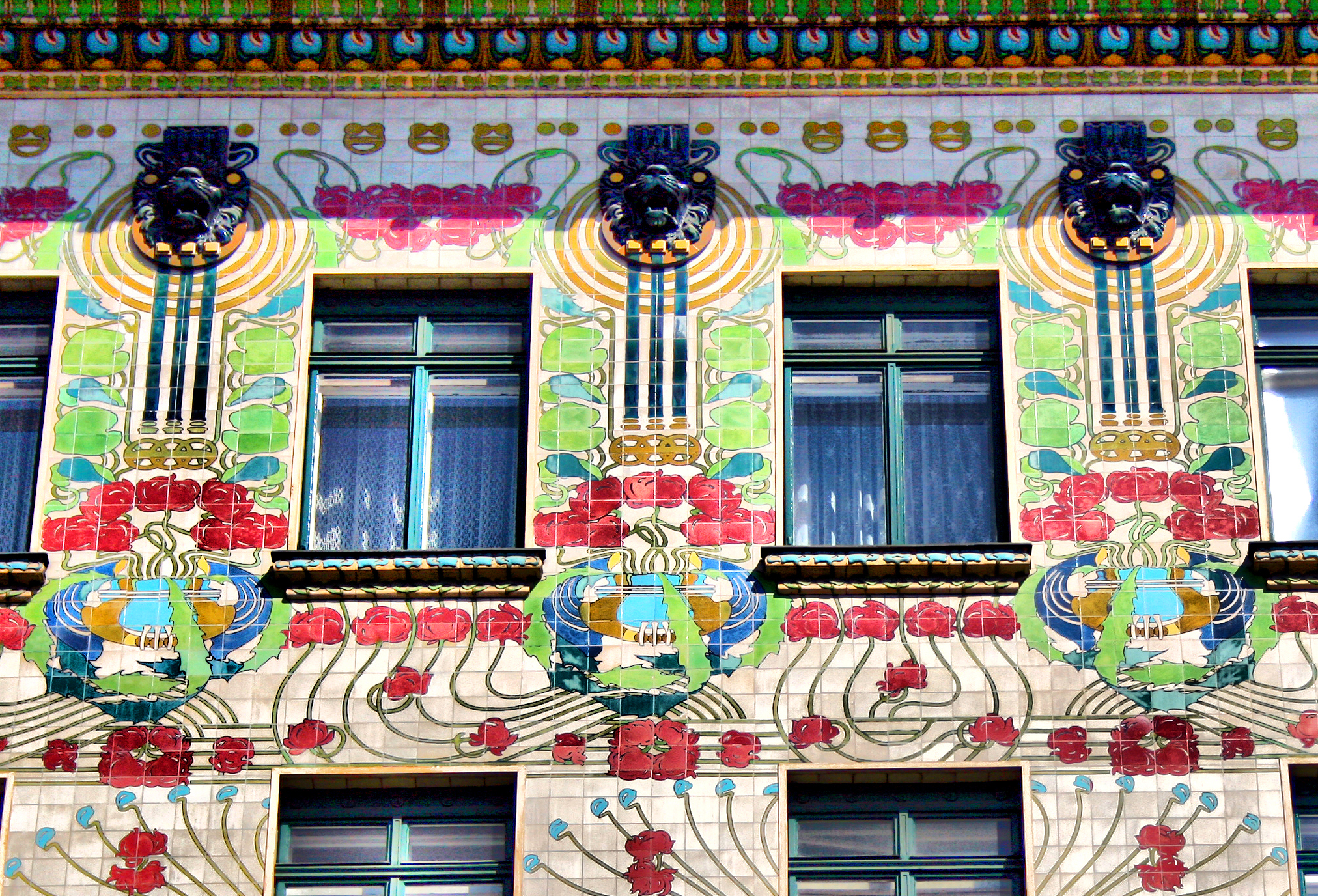
Majolica House by Otto Wagner (1898)

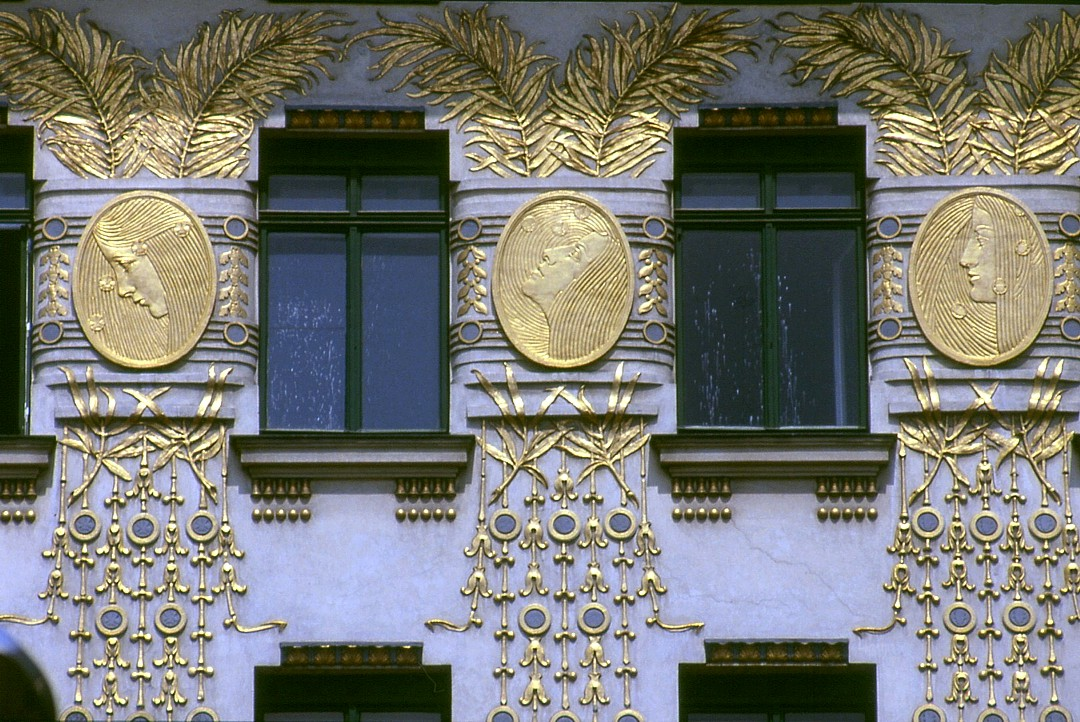
Medallion House by Otto Wagner

The Linke Wienzeile Buildings are two apartment buildings in Vienna constructed by Otto Wagner in 1898-99 in the Vienna Secession style. They are both lavishly decorated with colorful tiles, sculpture and wrought iron. One house, at 40 Linke Wienzeile, has a facade covered with majolica, or glazed earthenware tiles in floral designs, is popularly known as the Majolica House. The second, at 38 Linke Wienzeile, is called the Medallion House, for the bronze medallions on the facade. It also features sculpted angels on the roof. A third building nearby, at 3 Köstlergasse, was the town residence of Wagner for a time.

== History ==
As Vienna was expanding rapidly around its edges, in 1893 Wagner proposed a project to create a new channel for the Wien river, a tributary of the Danube, and a grand boulevard with new buildings to line it. His project was accepted by the city government in 1894.

Wagner was very critical of the historicism of the buildings which lined the Ringstrasse, the famous circular main boulevard of Vienna, which he termed a "stylistic masked ball". He presented his new ideas in an essay entitled Modern Architecture, published in 1896, calling for a new architecture whose forms expressed their functions. He had already designed several stations in the new style for the Vienna transit system. He now proposed two residential buildings in the new style.

=== Majolica House, Linke Wienzeile 40 (1898-99) ===
The most famous of these is the Majolikahaus or Majolica House, at Linke Wienzeile 40. Its facade is entirely covered with majolica, or colorful glazed earthenware tiles in the floral designs which characterized the early Vienna Secession. The facade decoration was made by his student Alois Ludwig. The facade was not only decorative, but had a practical purpose; the tile facade could be easily cleaned by using fire hoses.

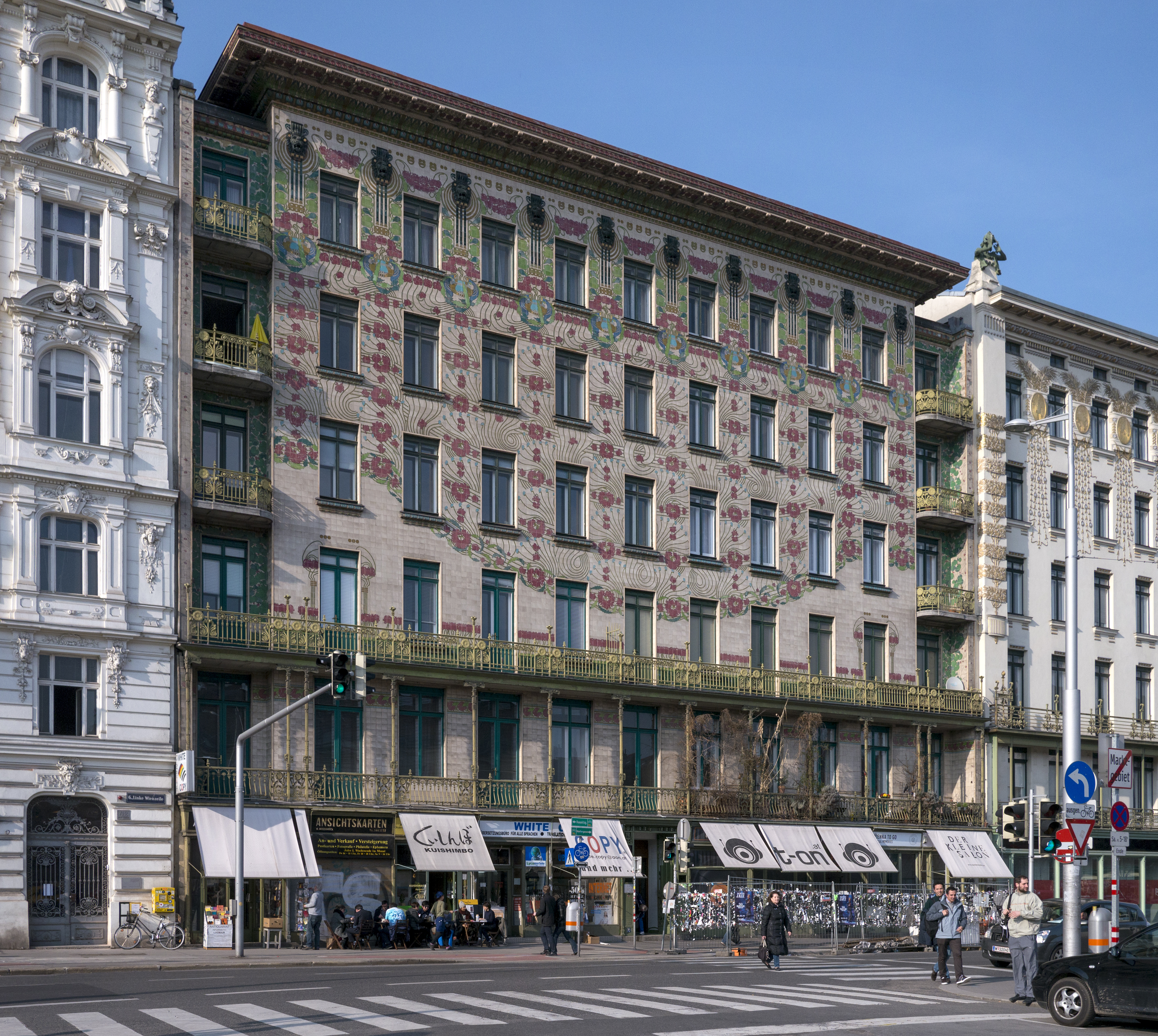
Majolica House (1898) at 40 Linke Wienzeile

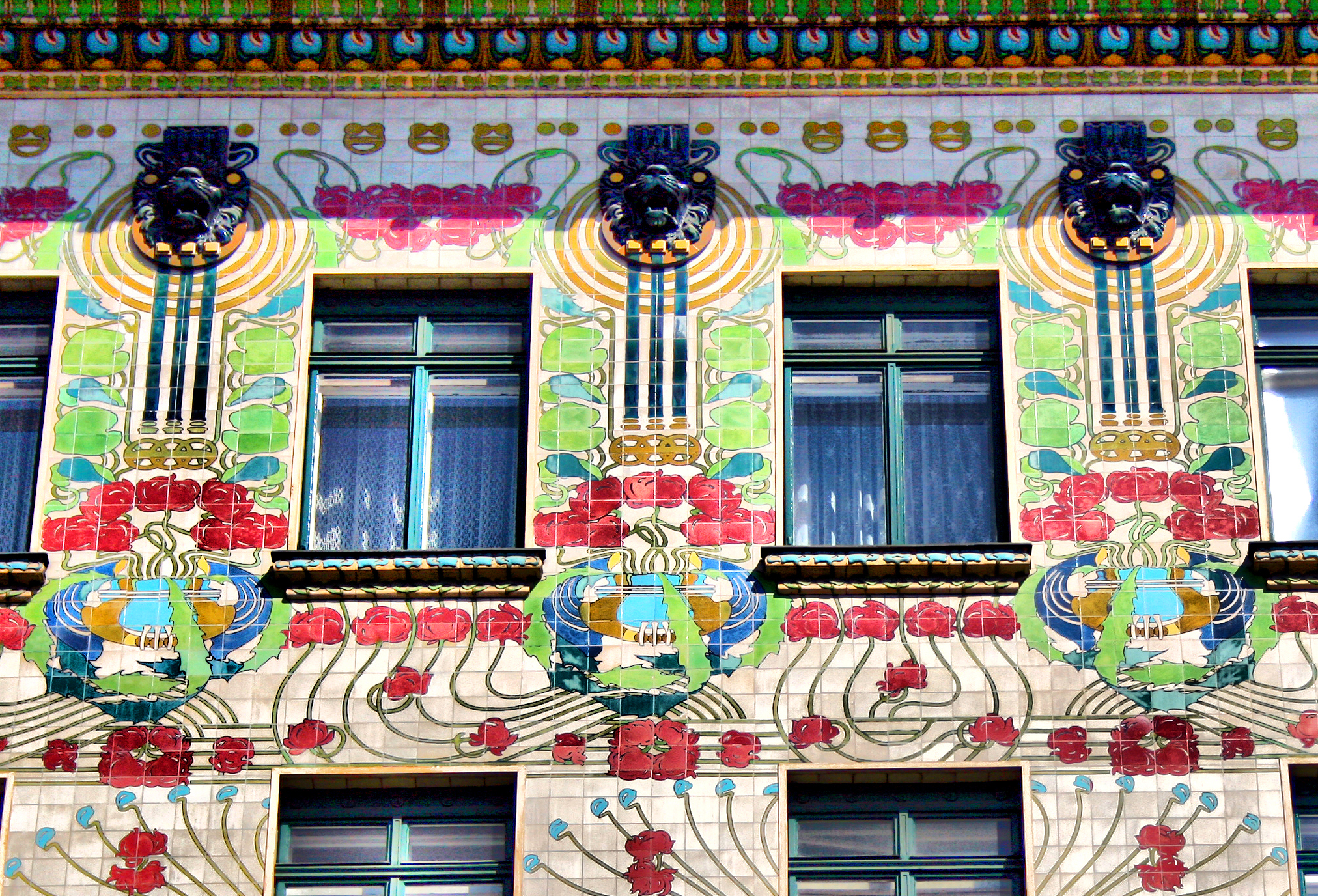
Detail of Majolica House (1898)

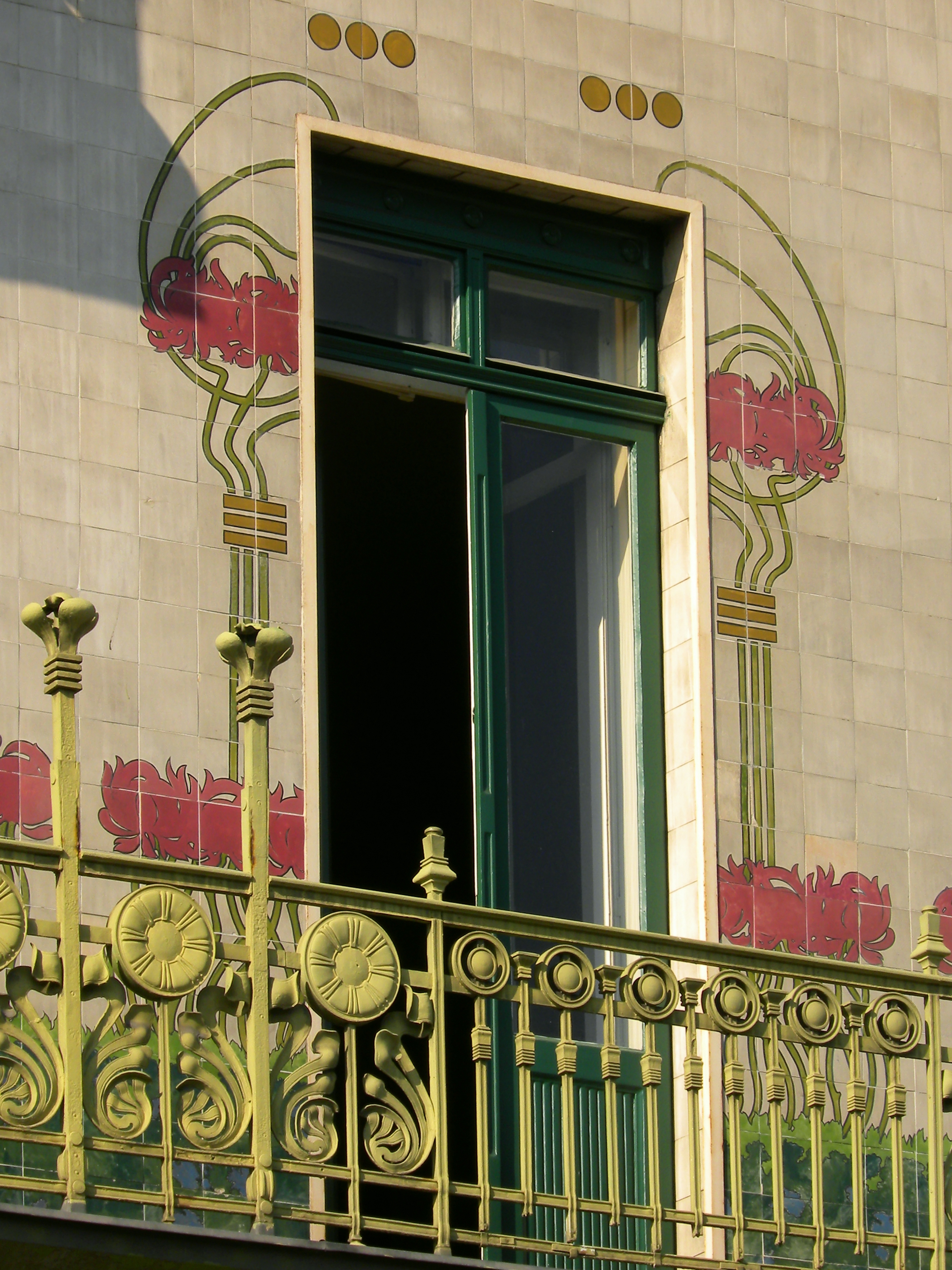
Balcony of Majolica House

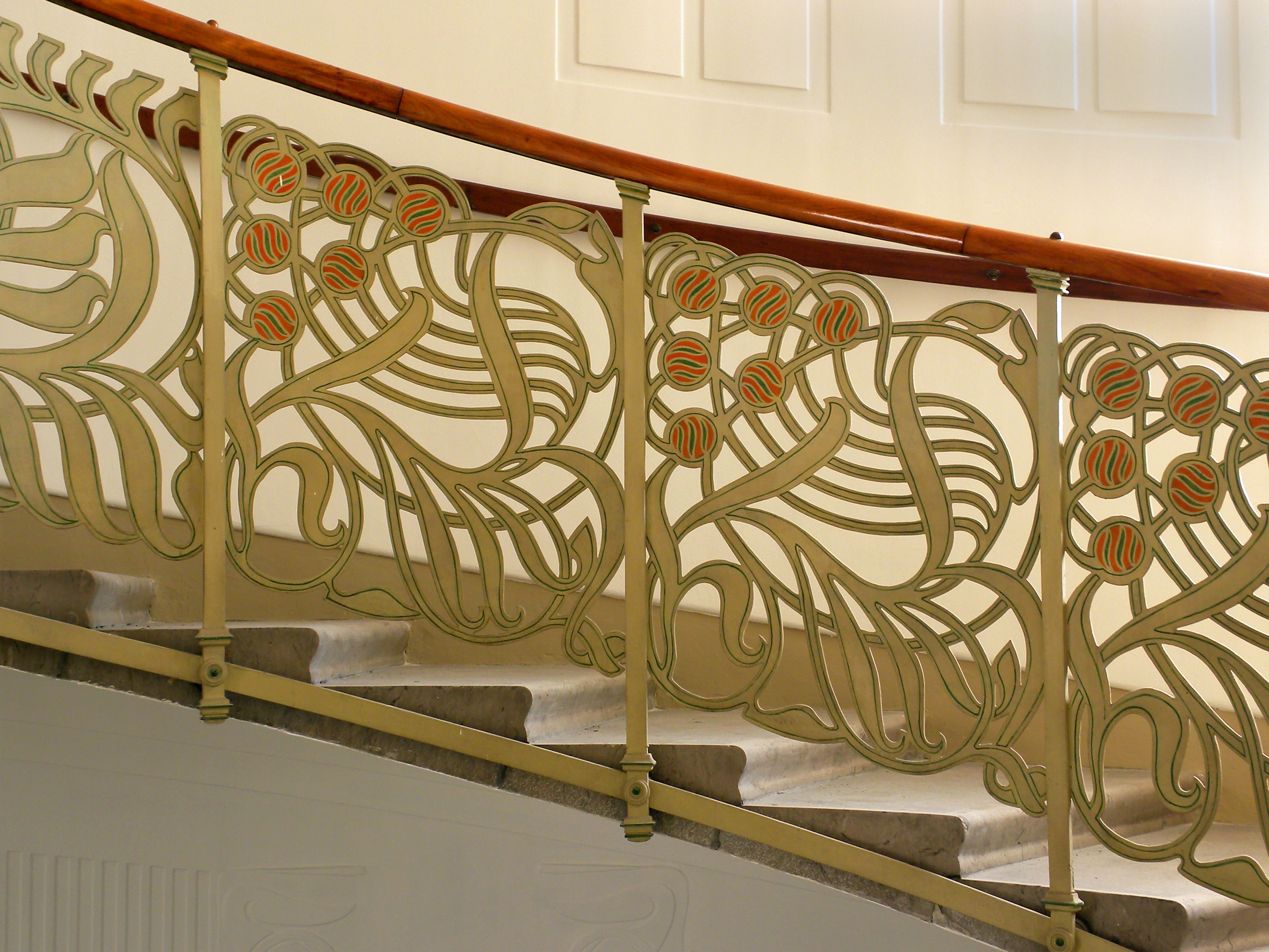
Stairway of Majolica House (1898)

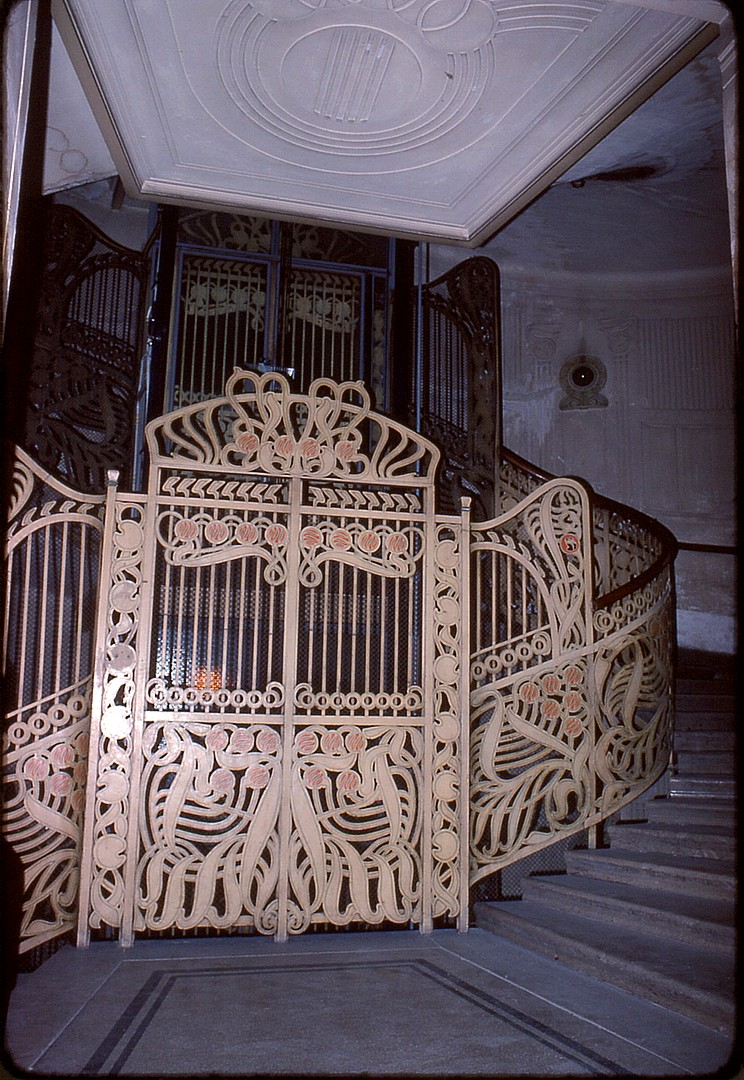
Elevator cage of Majolica House (1898)

=== Medallion House, Linke Wienzeile 38 (1898-99) ===
The other building, Linke Wienzeile 38, is known as Medallion House because of its decor of gilded stucco medallions by Wagner's student and frequent collaborator, Koloman Moser. The roof, visible from far away, features several sculpted heads, called The Criers, or The Crying Women by Othmar Schimkowitz. He provided sculpture for other Vienna Secession landmarks including the three gorgons on the 1898 Secession Building by Joseph Maria Olbrich, and for two other famous buildings by Hoffmann; the Kirche am Steinhof church in Vienna, and the rooftop sculpture of angels the Austrian Postal Savings Bank. The sculptures and other ornaments were removed when the style was out of fashion, but recently it has been restored to its original appearance.

Both buildings also feature very ornate wrought-iron decoration on the balconies and in the elevator cages and stairways in the interior, in keeping with the early Secession style.

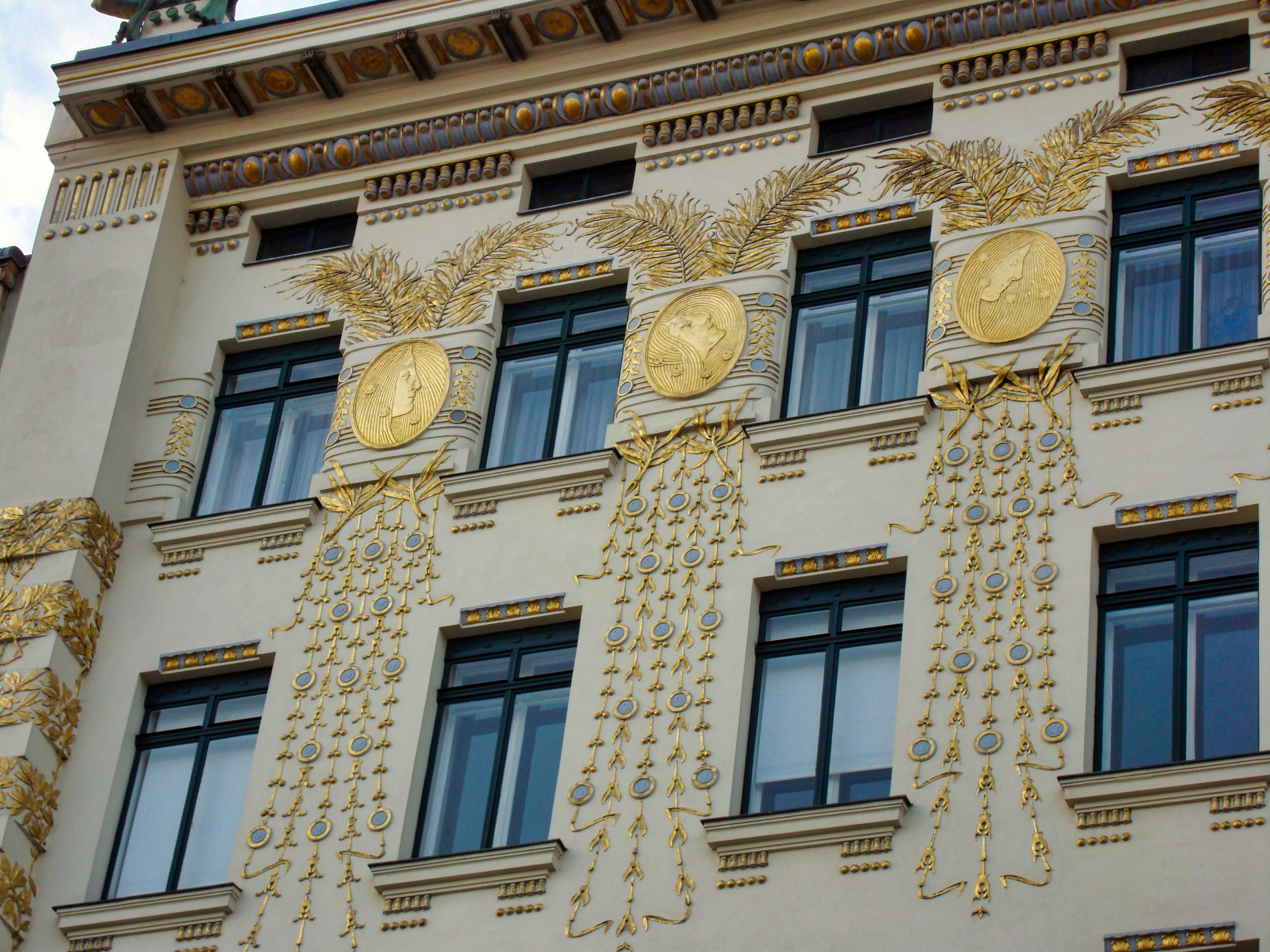
Facade of the Medallion House, Linke Wienzeile 38

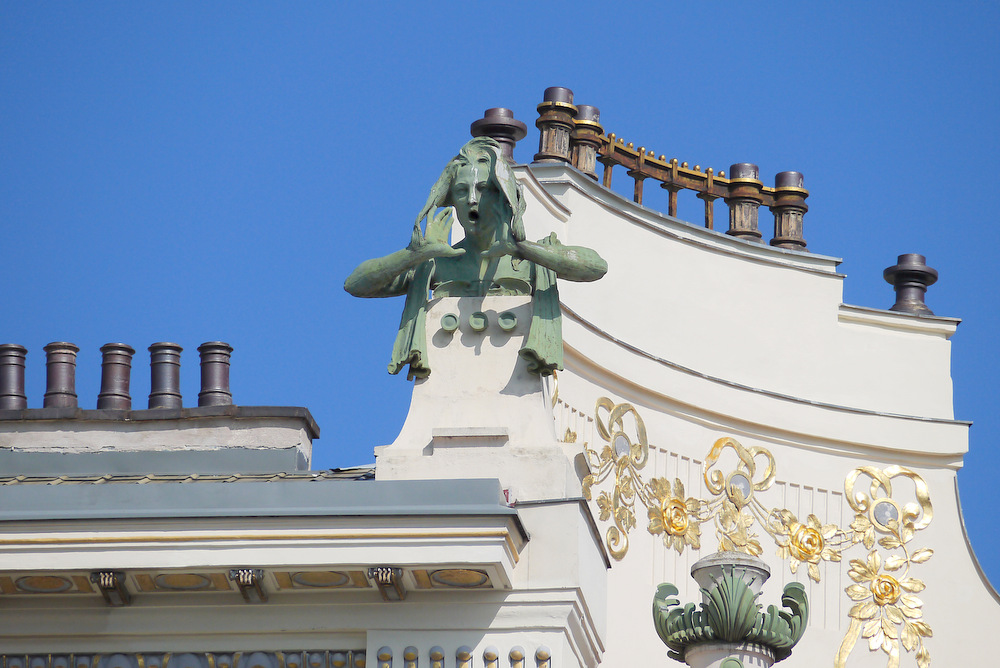
Calling Angel sculpture from Linke Wienzeile 38, by Othmar Schimkowitz

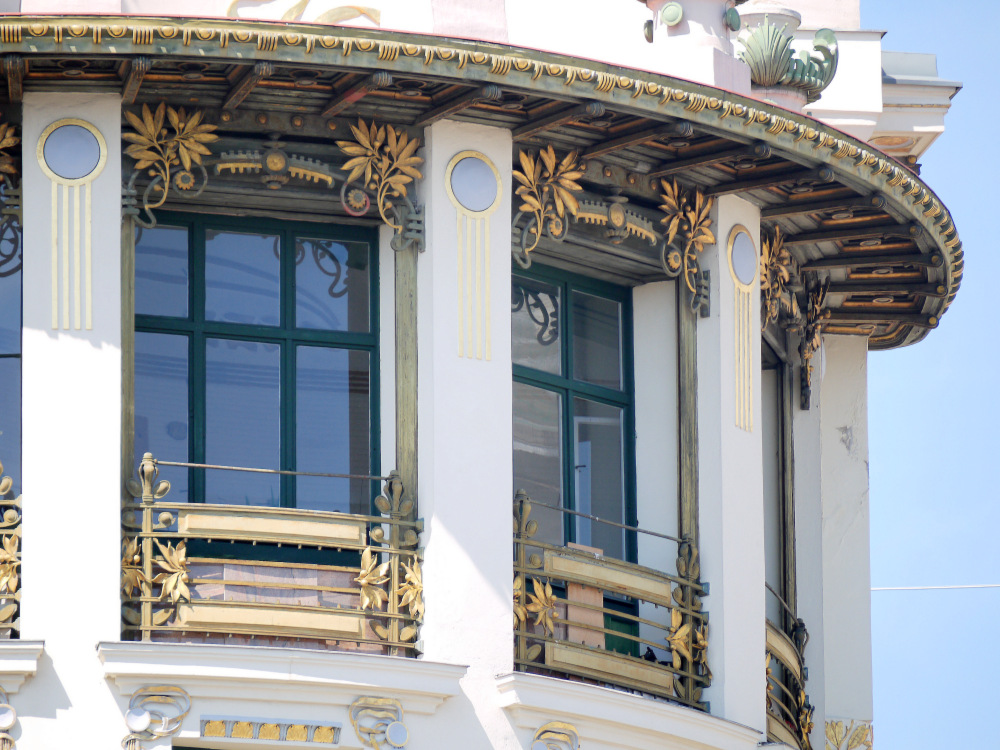
Roof and window detail, Linke Winzeile 38

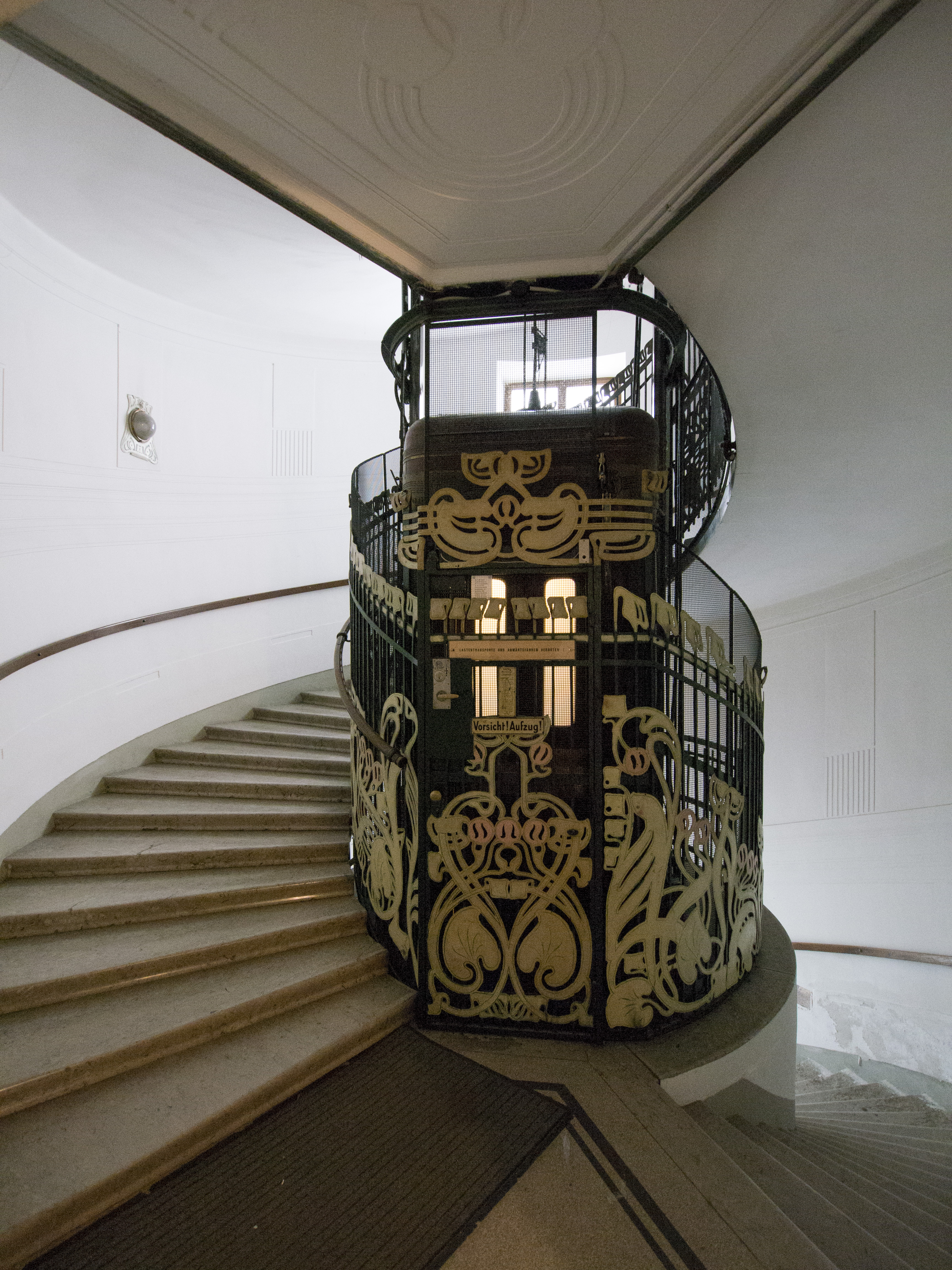
Stairwell of Medallion House

=== Wagner House, 3 Köstlergasse (1899) ===
Wagner had his own town apartment in a third building he built close by, at 3 Köstlergasse. It was completed in 1899, and had later renovations. The white facade is very sober, in his later style, with almost no ornament. The interior has more ornament, particularly in the curling railing of the stairwell.

His apartment featured decoration based on Japanese floral prints, and specially designed furniture, but its most famous feature was the bathroom. A marble plaque on the wall supported the shower head, the sink was of marble on nickel legs, and the bathtub was of glass, mounted in a nickel frame. Wagner had the bathroom displayed at the 1900 Paris Universal Exposition.

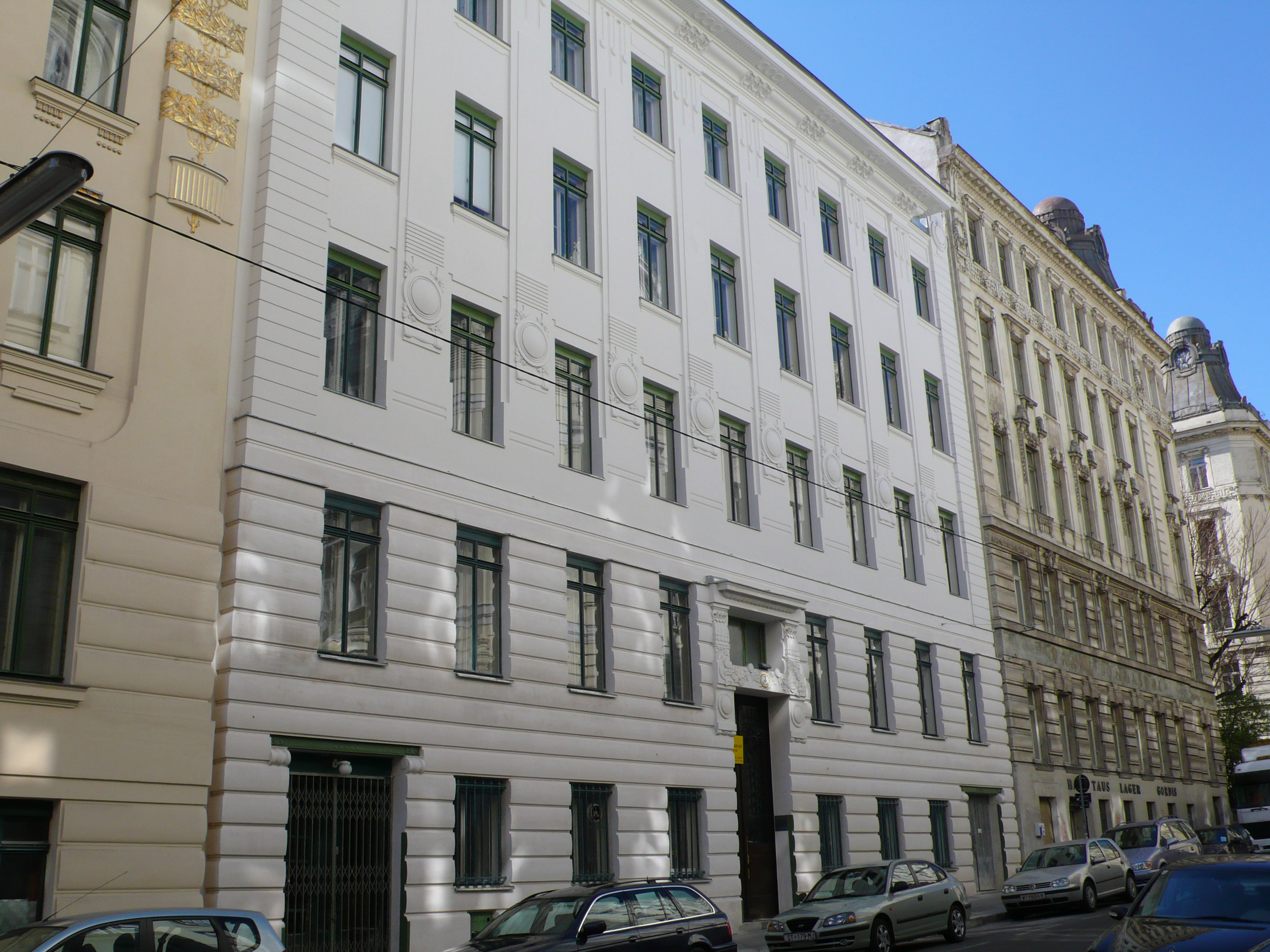
The renovated Wagner House apartment building on 3 Köstlergasse

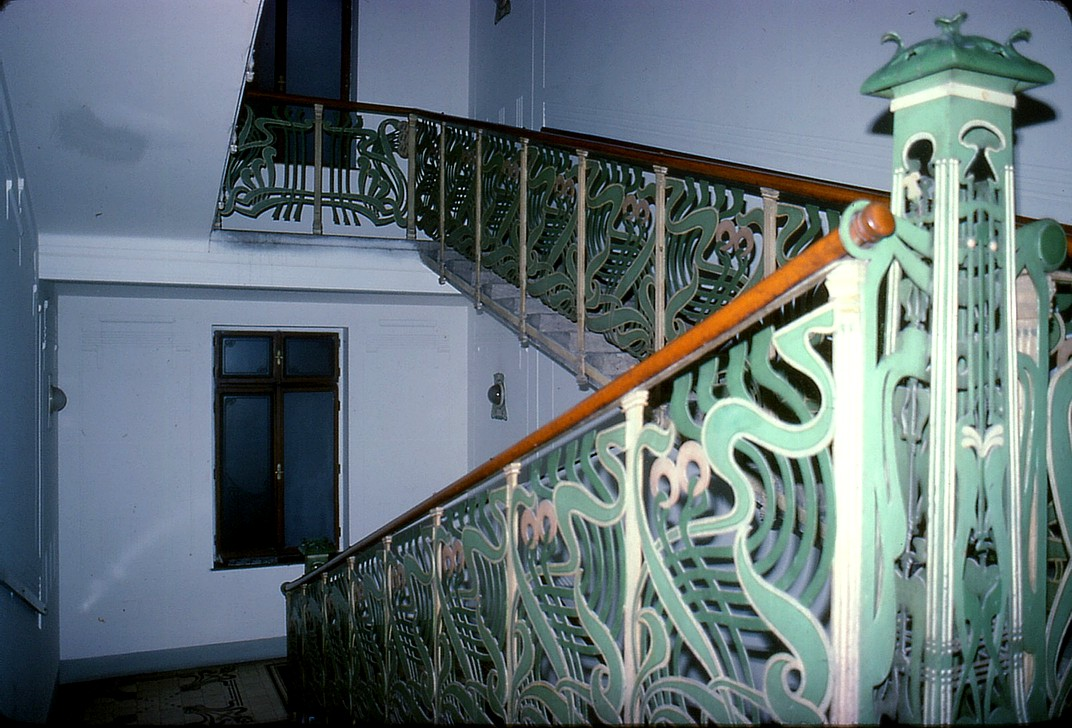
Stairway of the Otto Wagner House on 3 Köstlergasse, where Wagner had his apartment

== Bibliography ==
- Sarnitz, August (2018). Otto Wagner (in French). Cologne: Taschen. ISBN 978-3-8365-6432-8.
- Metzger, Rainer (2018). Vienne - des Années 1900 (in French). Cologne: Taschen. ISBN 978-3-8365-6704-6.

== See also ==
- Otto Wagner
- Vienna Secession
- Jugendstil
- Art Nouveau
