= Post Office Savings Bank (New Zealand) =

New Zealand bank

Post Office Bank Limited
- Type: State owned enterprise
- Predecessor: New Zealand Post Office
- Founded: 24 February 1987 (foundations set in 1867)
- Defunct: 1989
- Fate: Acquired by ANZ
- Headquarters: New Zealand
- Products: Postal banking

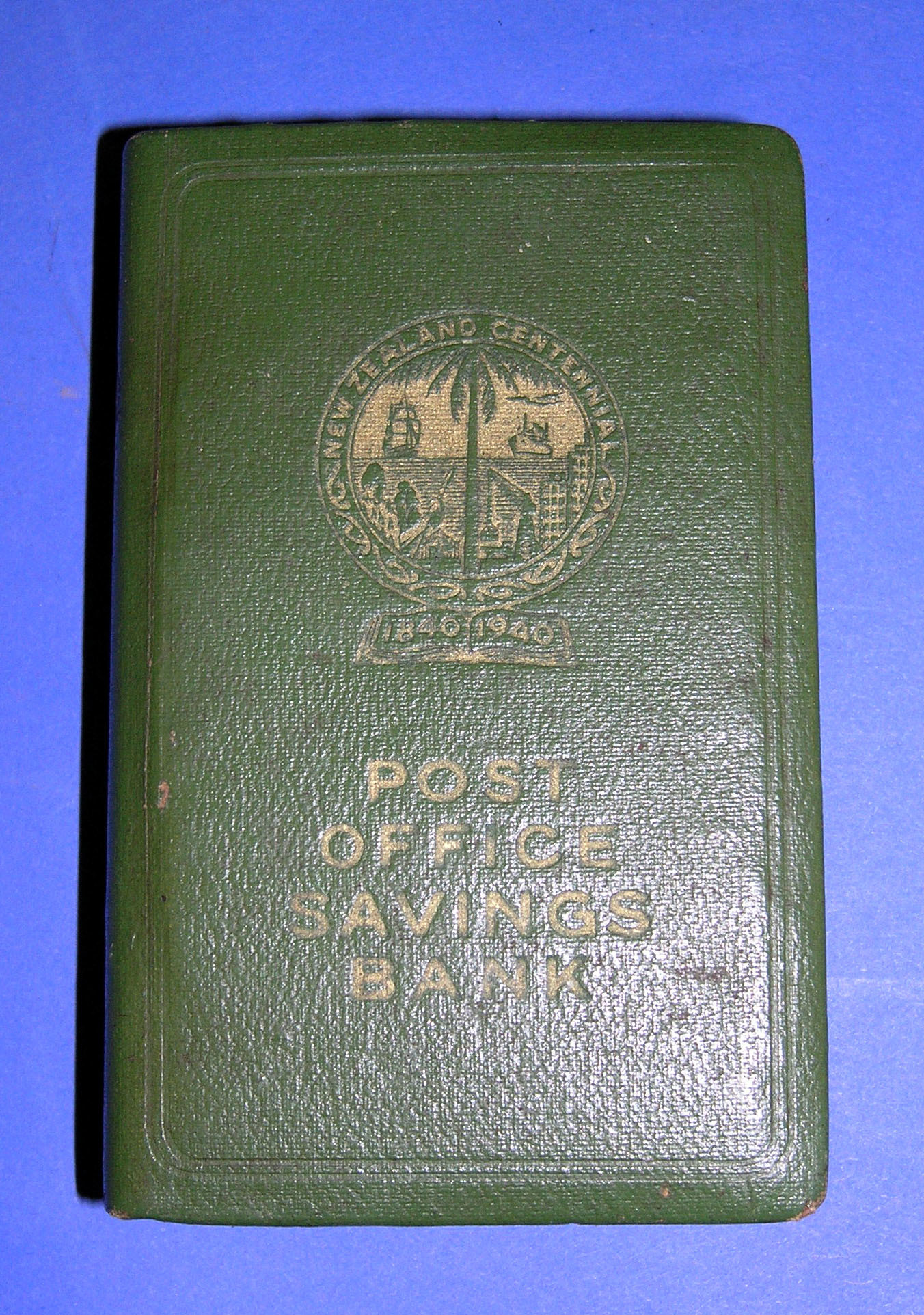
Post Office Savings Bank moneybox 1940

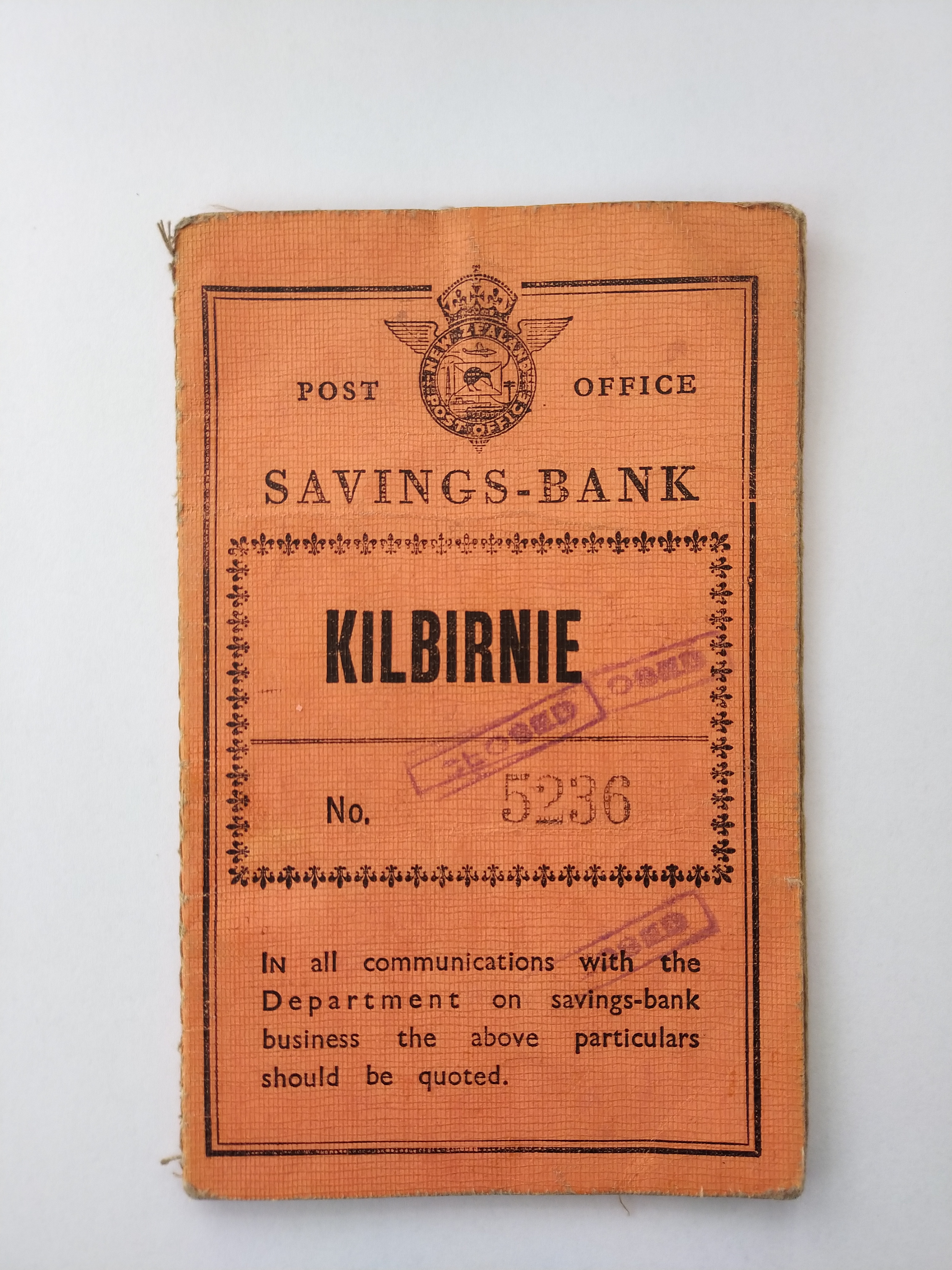
Passbook issued by the New Zealand Post Office Savings Bank in 1953

Post Office Savings Bank, or very briefly PostBank (trading name of Post Office Bank Limited), was a bank owned by the New Zealand Government as the government's postal savings system. The bank was established in 1867. It became PostBank in 1987 and was disestablished and the branches were rebranded when it was acquired by Australia and New Zealand Banking Group (ANZ) in 1989.

== History ==
The Post Office Savings Bank was set up in 1867 to encourage thrift by ordinary people, and was immediately successful. One of the benefits of the Post Office Savings Bank was that customers could deposit and withdraw money at any branch of the bank. Business was conducted from post offices which were located in towns and cities all over New Zealand. By the 1910s customers were asking for the ability to withdraw their funds by cheque but successive postmasters-general refused to allow this, stating that the Post Office Savings Bank was not the same as a commercial bank, having as its objective thrift and regular deposits, not convenience. This had the effect of making it easy to deposit money but harder to withdraw it. However the bank eventually moved with the times and cheques were introduced in 1958. During its long history the Post Office Savings Bank introduced various other products including school banking (the 'Squirrel' savings accounts) and Bonus Bonds.

== PostBank ==
PostBank was formed when the New Zealand Post Office (a former Government Department) was split up by the Postal Services Act 1987 into Post Office Bank Ltd (trading as PostBank), New Zealand Post Ltd (a postal services company) and Telecom Corporation of New Zealand Ltd (a telecommunications company). It purchased the assets of the former Post Office Savings Bank.

PostBank was sold two years after it was formed to ANZ, with the PostBank brand being absorbed and finally removed by the late 1990s.

PostBank shared many operating characteristics with the later Kiwibank, a bank which initially operated as a wholly owned subsidiary of the state-owned enterprise, New Zealand Post Limited. Later, Kiwibank and New Zealand Post started a process of no longer co-locating, with Kiwibank opening 13 stand-alone premises.
