= Bonus Bonds =

Bonus Bonds logo

Bonus Bonds was a New Zealand unit trust founded in 1970 with a reward scheme based on cash prizes. The New Zealand government launched Bonus Bonds under the Unit Trusts Act 1960 through the Post Office Savings Bank with the goal of encouraging New Zealanders to save money. It was the country's largest retail unit trust, with around one third of New Zealanders owning bonds.

== Management ==
As of 2013 the ANZ managed the trust (ANZ acquired PostBank (Post Office Bank Ltd) from the government in 1988). Trustees Executors Limited acted as a trustee for bondholders. Potential customers could purchase bonds from any ANZ branch or from any PostShop.

Management invested trust funds in "safe" assets such as corporate securities, government bonds and securities issued by banks.

== Prizes ==
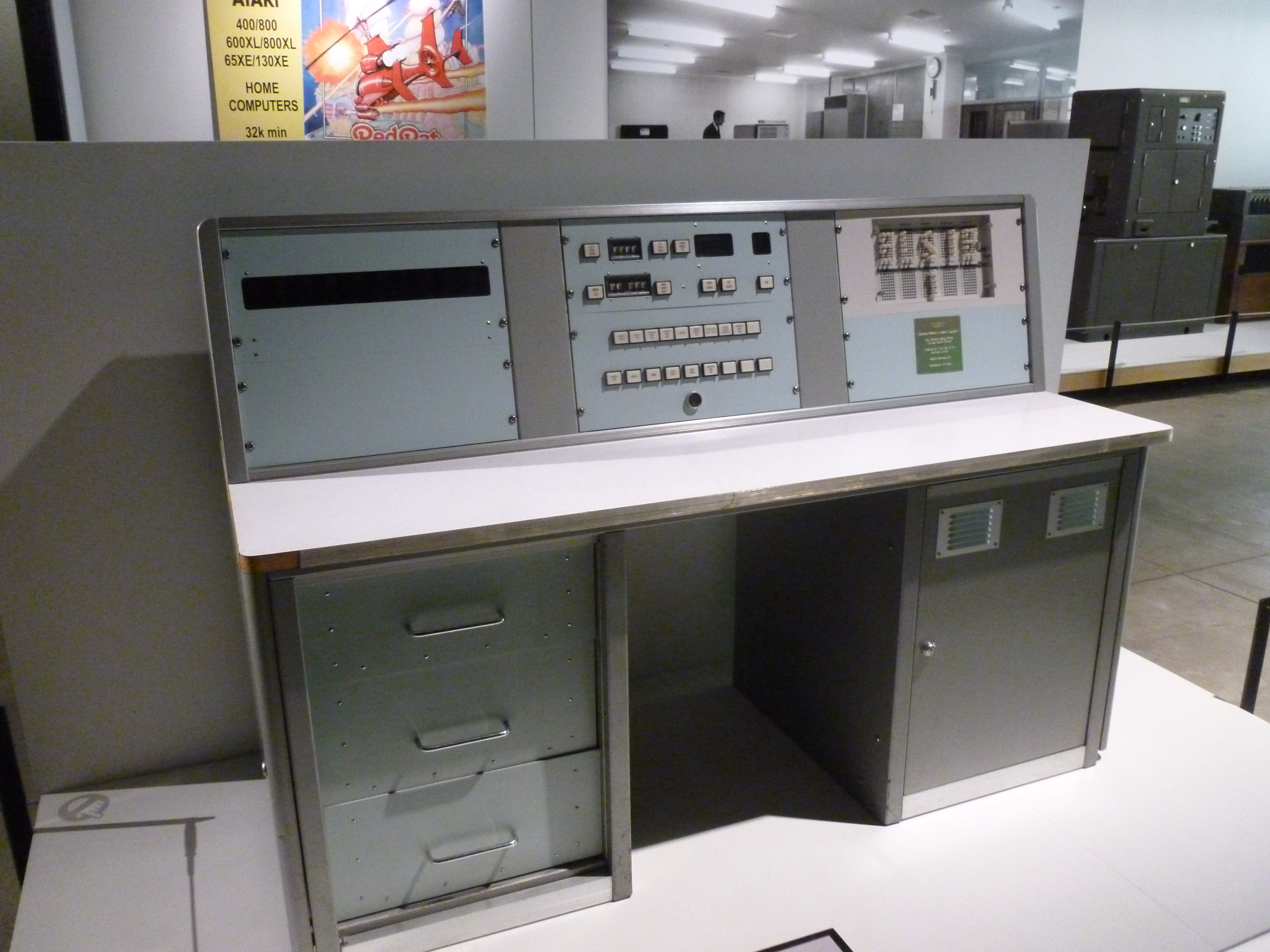
Electronic Selective indicator equipment (ELSIE) was the machine that first selected Bonus Bonds in the 1970s.

Each month the trust paid out a total of NZ$7.9 million, consisting of 248,000 random tax-paid cash prizes, based on the amount invested, with three top prizes: one of $1,000,000, one of $100,000 and one of $50,000. In order to participate in a draw, investors must purchase a minimum $20 in bonds, and must have held them for a full calendar month.

The chances of winning did not exceed one in 9,600 per unit – as required by the Finance Act (No 2) 1990. As of 2007 the chance of each unit winning a prize ranged from one in 9,600 to one in 11,000. In 2015 the odds of winner per unit increased to range from between one in 14,000 to one in 20,000. A single bonus bond or unit translated to one dollar, and each unit owned had a chance of winning. The average win was apparently around $27.50, giving a tax-free return of around 3.4% . Returns varied based on security returns, and these are of course averaged figures which varied greatly due to the random nature of the investment. Mary Holm in The New Zealand Herald described Bonus Bonds thus: "As I've said before, having a bit in bonus bonds is fine if you regard it as fun. But it is not the place for major savings". New Zealand personal finance website moneyhub reported in a study that 99.996% of bonus bonds returned $0 to their owners in a typical monthly draw.

To conduct the draw the Bonus Bonds trust used a random number generator called ELSIE (Electronic Selection Indicator Equipment), based in the Bonus Bonds Transaction Centre in central Dunedin.

== Marketing ==
Comedian Leigh Hart ('That Guy') promoted Bonus Bonds in a television advertisement, presenting the bonds as an exciting way to invest, with the catchphrase "the money and the bag" (referring to It's in the Bag, a long-running New Zealand radio and television game show).

== Winding up of scheme ==
In August 2020, ANZ announced that the Bonus Bonds scheme would be wound up in October 2020, stating that "low interest rates had reduced the investment returns of the scheme affecting the size of its prize pool".

== See also ==
- Premium Bonds, a similar scheme operating in the United Kingdom
