= Othmar Schimkowitz =

Austrian architectural sculptor (1864–1947)

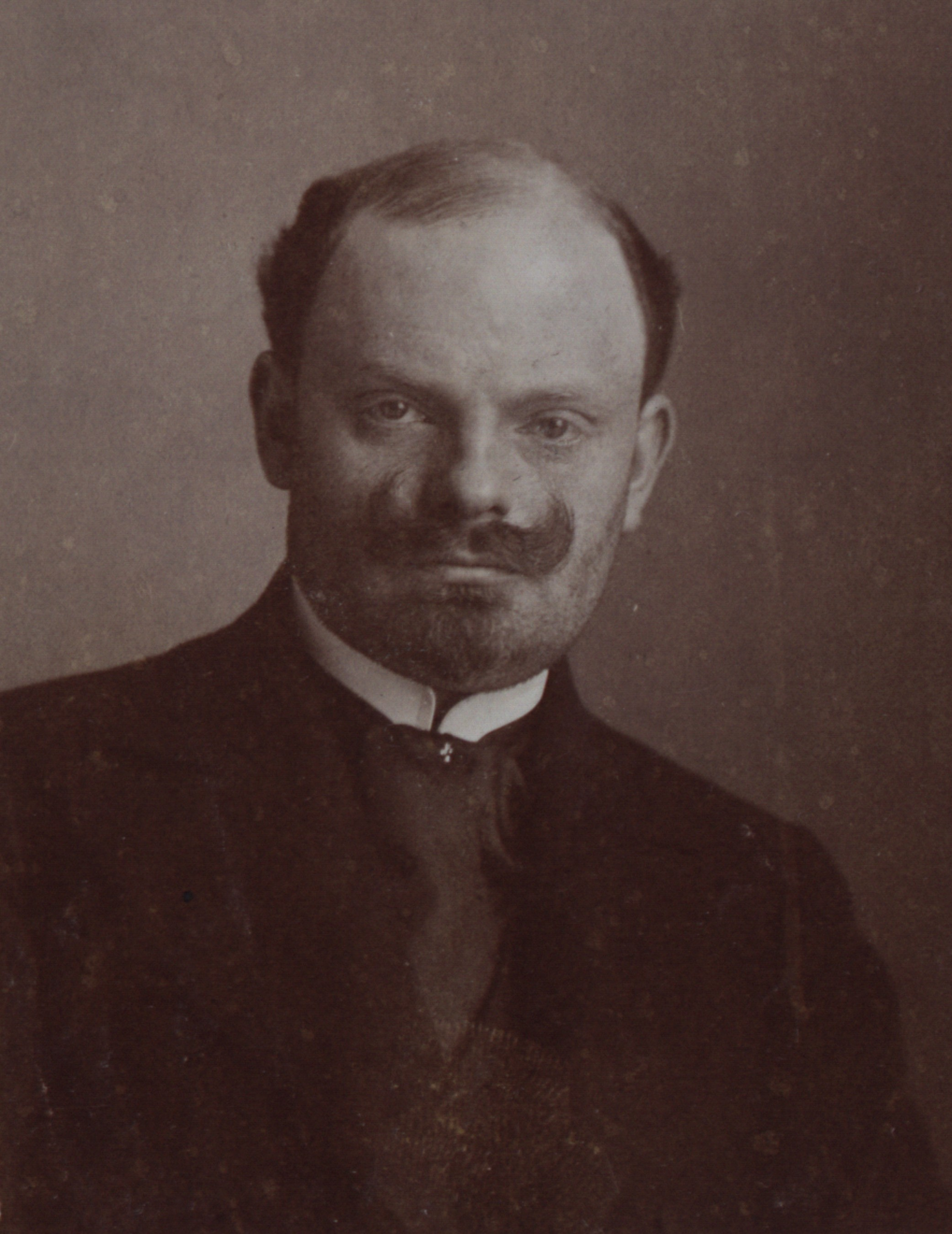
- Born: 2 October 1864; Tárts, Austrian Empire
- Died: 24 April 1947 (aged 82); Graz, Austria
- Education: Edmund von Hellmer, Carl Kundmann
- Known for: Architectural sculpture
- Movement: Art Nouveau

Othmar Schimkowitz (2 October 1864 in Tárts, Komárom County – 24 April 1947 in Graz) was a Hungarian-born architectural sculptor who worked on major landmarks of the Vienna Secession.

== Life ==
Schimkowitz studied at the Academy of Fine Arts Vienna, lived for three years in New York as friends with the Austrian-American sculptor Karl Bitter, and returned to Vienna in 1895. He joined the Vienna Secession in 1898.

== Major works ==
His architectural sculpture includes:

- Figurative ornamentation for the 1897 Gutenberg Monument, Vienna, Jože Plečnik, architect
- The three gorgons on the 1898 Secession exhibition building in Vienna, Joseph Maria Olbrich, architect
- The "calling women" of the 1898-1899 of the Linke Wienzeile Buildings by Otto Wagner, architect
- Exterior work on the Austrian Pavilion at the 1904 Louisiana Purchase Exposition in St. Louis, Missouri
- Rooftop angels of the 1904-1906 Austrian Postal Savings Bank in Vienna, also for Wagner
- Angels on the 1907 Kirche am Steinhof in Vienna, also for Wagner

== Gallery ==
Steinhof Church commemorative coin

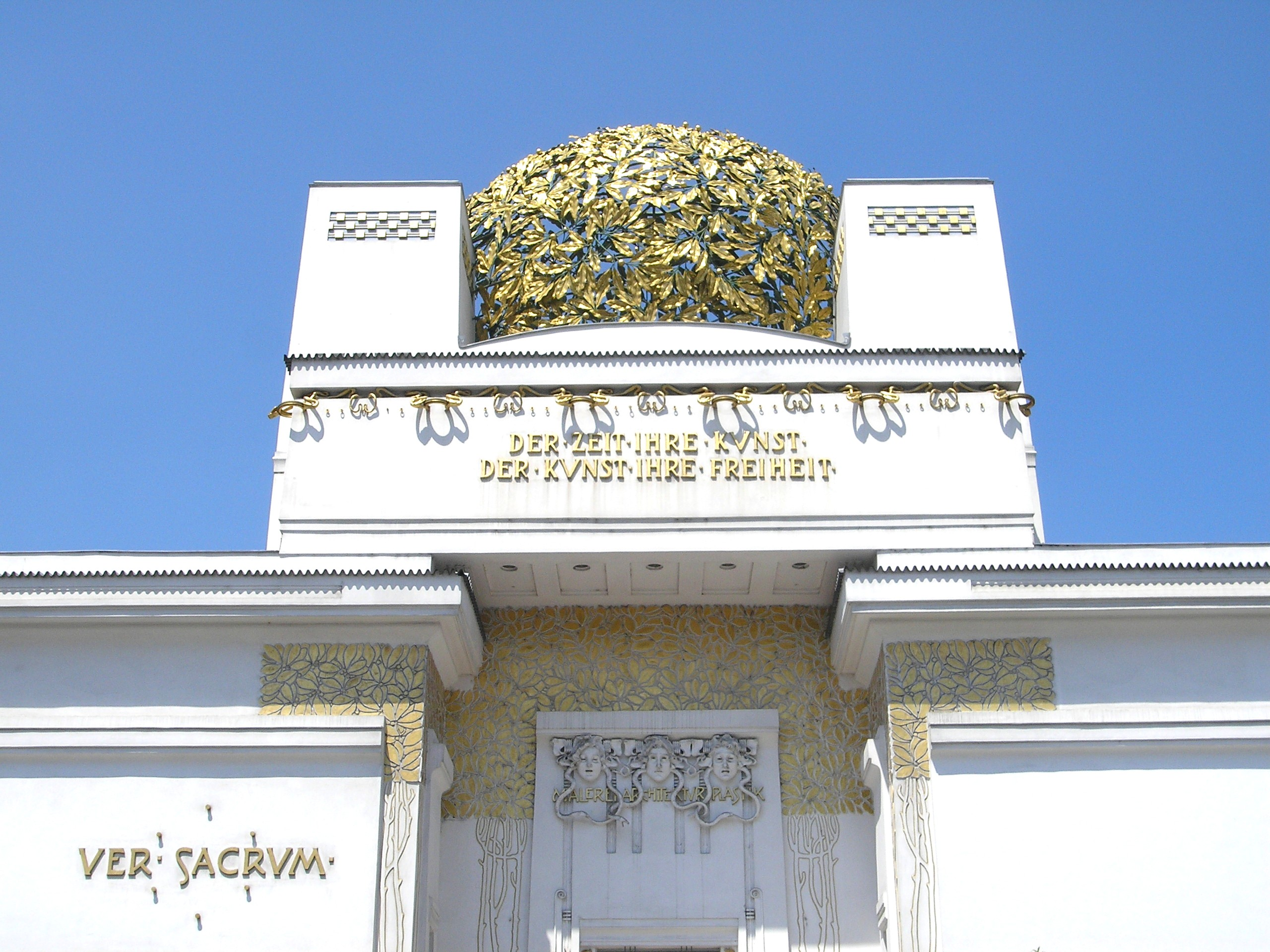
The 1898 Secession Building

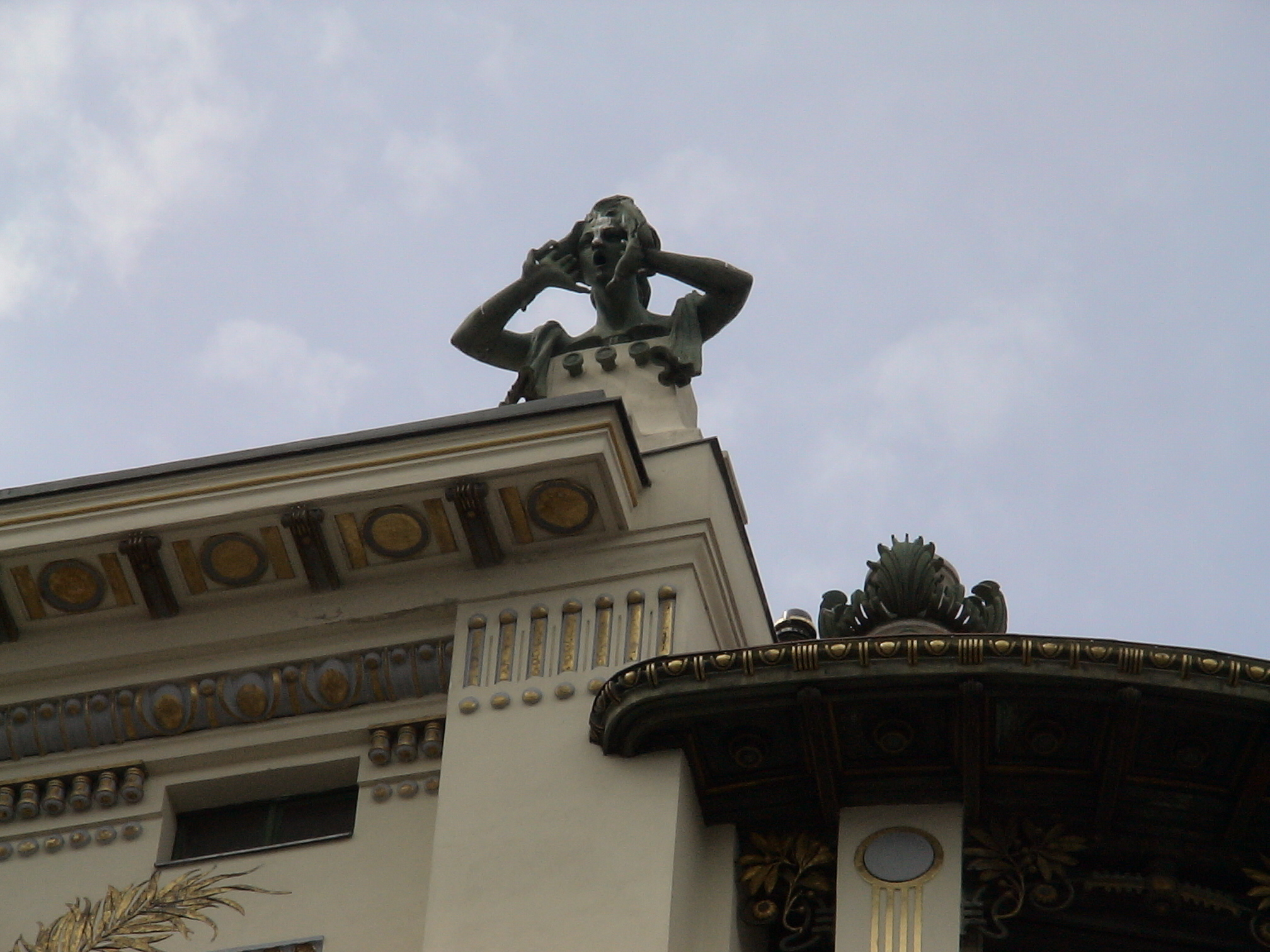
Wienzeile 38 apartment block, Vienna

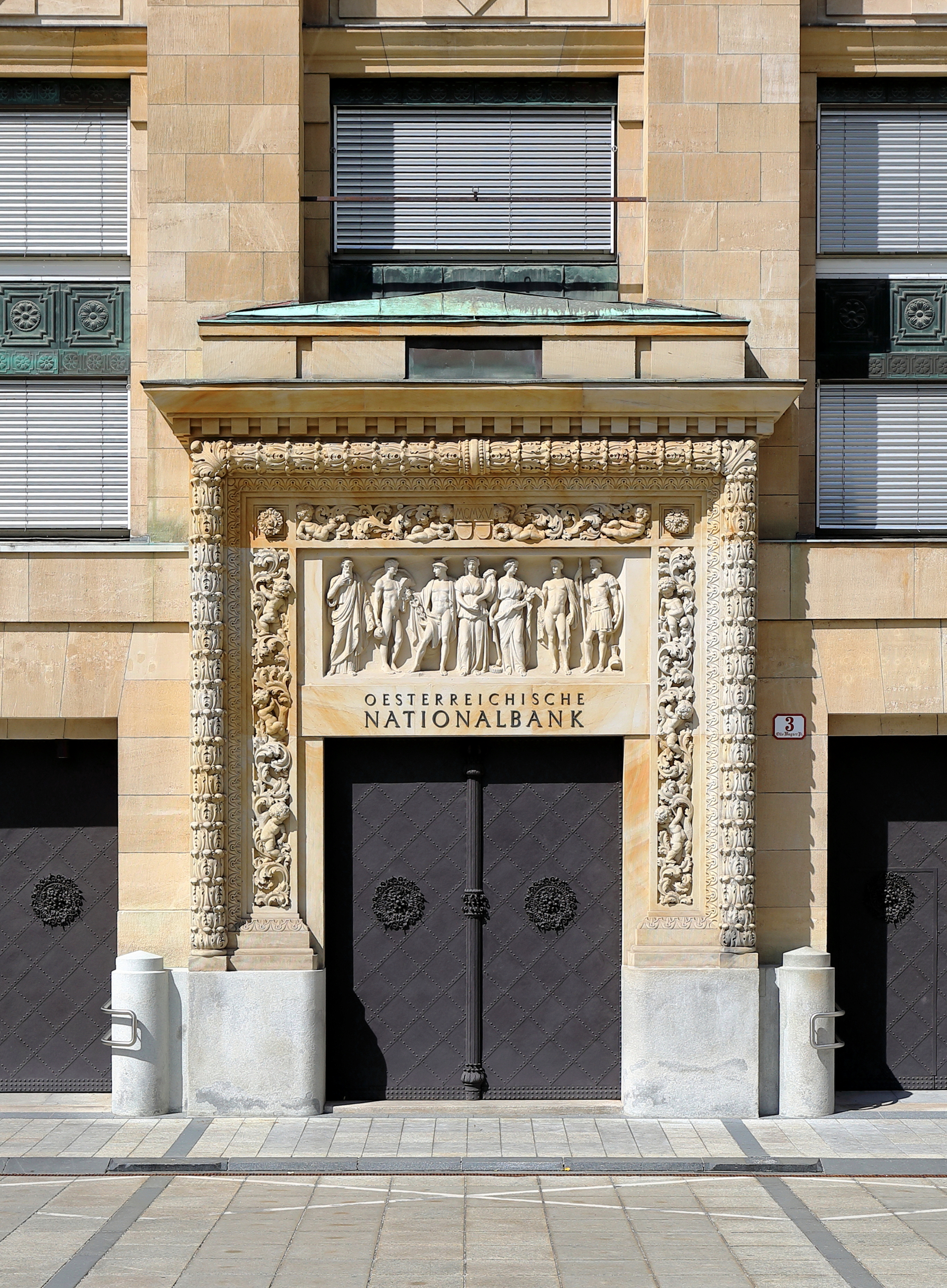
Oesterreichische Nationalbank Building: Relief

== See also ==
One of Schimkowitz's most prominent designs used in a building, (the Kirche am Steinhof), was selected as a major motif for one of the most famous euro collectors coins: the Austrian 100 euro Steinhof Church commemorative coin, minted on November 9, 2005. On the reverse of the coin, the Koloman Moser stained glass window over the main entrance can be seen. In the center of the window is God the Father seated on a throne. The window is flanked by a pair of bronze angels in Jugendstil style, originally designed by Othmar Schimkowitz.
