= New TT Hellenic Postbank =

New TT Hellenic Postbank SA
- Native name: Νέο Ταχυδρομικό Ταμιευτήριο Ελλάδος Α.Τ.Ε.
- Industry: Financial services
- Predecessor: TT Hellenic Postbank
- Founded: January 18, 2013 in Athens, Greece
- Defunct: December 27, 2013– Merger by absorption by Eurobank Ergasias S.A.
- Area served: Greece
- Services: Banking
- Parent: Eurobank
- Website: eurobank.gr

New TT Hellenic Postbank was a commercial bank based in Athens, Greece that was created out of the liquidation of TT Hellenic Postbank. In 2013 Eurobank Group acquired New TT Hellenic Postbank.

The operational integration of New TT Hellenic Postbank was completed in May 2014, while Eurobank decided to keep the branch network distinct, under the brand name “New TT Branch Network” for some time until it was rebranded as Eurobank.

== See also ==
- Postal savings system
- Postbank (disambiguation)
- List of banks in Greece
