= United States Postal Savings System =

Postal savings system, in operation 1911–1967

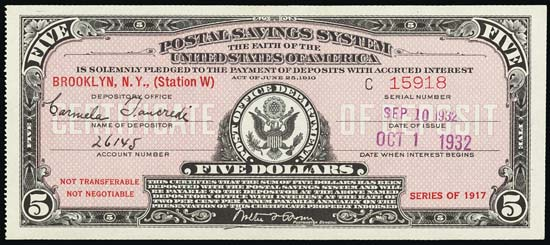
A certificate of a $5 deposit in the United States Postal Savings System issued on September 10, 1932

The United States Postal Savings System was a postal savings system operated by the United States Post Office Department (predecessor of the United States Postal Service) from January 1, 1911, until July 1, 1967. It was created by the Postal Savings System Act of 1910 passed by Congress and signed into law by President William Howard Taft.

== Operations ==
The Postal Savings System was established as a result of lobbying by farmers and workers with grievances against the private banking system due to numerous bank closures and what was prevented to be difficulties obtaining loans. After the Panic of 1907, the Republican Party supported a postal banking system, while Democrats preferred deposit insurance. After Republican William Howard Taft won the 1908 United States presidential election and Republicans won majorities in both chambers of the United States Congress, the Postal Savings System Act was passed by Congress and signed by Taft on June 25, 1910.

The system accepted deposits from the general public, but did not offer full banking services. Instead, it redeposited the funds to designated banks at interest. It took one-half percent of the interest to cover administrative expenses and passed on the rest—around two percent—to the customer. Accounts in the system were initially limited to a balance of $500, which was raised to $1,000 in 1916 and to $2,500 in 1918. Immigrants, workers, farmers and people living in parts of the rural West and Midwest were most likely to patronize the Postal Savings System until the Great Depression, when high rates of use were no longer “limited to certain places and particular groups.”

Most other postal savings systems invested deposits in public debt, but in 1910 Americans believed that the small national debt of the United States was temporary, so 95% of deposits in the US system were redeposited in national banks within the same state that paid 2.25%, and in public debt if such banks were unavailable. To avoid competing with banks that paid 3.5% interest on deposits on 1910, the system was fixed to 2% by law. Its creators expected that the postal savings system would stabilize the economy, as when customers withdrew funds during a bank run they would deposit into the postal system, which would redeposit into the banking system. Maureen O'Hara described the mechanism as a "gerbil-like treadmill". (She wrote that when several large banks that had gained deposits during the March 2023 United States bank failures redeposited funds into First Republic Bank, "The gerbil lives again!")

Total assets in the postal system remained at about $200 million until the Great Depression, when many savings and loan associations (S&Ls) failed. Customers seeking the postal savings system's security—and the 2% interest rate, which was now comparable to what banks and S&Ls offered—greatly increased postal savings deposits to about $1.2 billion. Because the system could not redeposit funds in S&Ls, which made most mortgage loans, the housing market weakened. As more banks refused postal deposits because of the 2.25% (raised to 2.5% in 1934) interest requirement, the system increasingly invested in the only legal alternative, public debt, further constricting the money supply. O'Hara and David Easley wrote that the inflexibility of the postal system inadvertently worsened the economy during the Depression, instead of stabilizing it as intended.

At its peak in 1947, the system held almost $3.4 billion in deposits. In addition to holding cash deposits, the system also sold fixed-term bonds and operated a Savings Card program. These cards provided spaces for a fixed number of postage stamps, each purchased for a few cents. Once filled, the cards could be presented for credit to a savings account in the system.

From 1921, depositors were fingerprinted. Although this practice was initially 'not to be associated with criminology', the early 1950s Yours Truly, Johnny Dollar radio show suggested that in some instances, Postal Savings account fingerprints were used for positive identification in criminal cases.

According to a 2019 analysis, "the program was initially used by non-farming immigrant populations for short-term saving, then as a safe haven during the Great Depression, and finally as a long-term investment for the wealthy during the 1940s... Postal Savings was only a partial substitute for traditional banks, as locations with banks often still heavily used postal savings."

== Decline ==
The United States Postal Savings System experienced a decline in deposits during the postwar period as commercial banks expanded and federal deposit insurance became more widely established. The availability of United States savings bonds also provided an alternative for savers.

Deposits in the system peaked at approximately $3.4 billion in 1947 before falling to about $416 million by 1964. Congress subsequently legislated its discontinuation. The system stopped accepting deposits on 27 April 1966 and officially closed on 1 July 1967. Approximately $50 million in unclaimed deposits was transferred to the United States Treasury.

In 1971, legislation authorized the distribution of remaining funds among states and other jurisdictions in proportion to their respective shares of postal savings liabilities. The Treasury retained funds to meet outstanding claims. The Postal Savings System Statute of Limitations Act, enacted on 13 July 1984, established a one-year deadline for claims against the system. Claims submitted after 13 July 1985, were barred under the statute.

== Locations ==
On March 26, 1911, the locations of the central depositories for the first 19 states were established, followed the next day by 25 others. The post offices were selected by merit rather than by geography, based on those with the best efficiency record in the state.

- Bessemer, Alabama
- Globe, Arizona
- Stuttgart, Arkansas
- Oroville, California
- Leadville, Colorado
- Ansonia, Connecticut
- Dover, Delaware
- Brunswick, Georgia
- Coeur d'Alene, Idaho
- Pekin, Illinois
- Princeton, Indiana
- Decorah, Iowa
- Pittsburg, Kansas
- Middlesboro, Kentucky
- New Iberia, Louisiana
- Rumford, Maine
- Frostburg, Maryland
- Norwood, Massachusetts
- Houghton, Michigan
- Anaconda, Montana
- Nebraska City, Nebraska
- Carson City, Nevada
- Berlin, New Hampshire
- Rutherford, New Jersey
- Raton, New Mexico
- Cohoes, New York
- Salisbury, North Carolina
- Wahpeton, North Dakota
- Ashtabula, Ohio
- Guymon, Oklahoma
- Klamath Falls, Oregon
- Dubois, Pennsylvania
- Bristol, Rhode Island
- Newberry, South Carolina
- Deadwood, South Dakota
- Johnson City, Tennessee
- Port Arthur, Texas
- Provo, Utah
- Montpelier, Vermont
- Clifton Forge, Virginia
- Olympia, Washington
- Grafton, West Virginia
- Manitowoc, Wisconsin
- Laramie, Wyoming
