= Post Office Squirrel savings account =

The Post Office Squirrel savings account was a New Zealand savings programme set up through the New Zealand Post Office to encourage younger citizens to save money. It is no longer active.

The School Savings Bank scheme was established in 1934 to encourage children to save money regularly, with the hope that when they left school they would continue to make regular deposits from their wages. The squirrel mascot and phrase "be squirrel wise" were in use by the mid-1950s. Initially children bought stamps in small denominations from their teacher, which were then swapped for a deposit in the child's bank account. Later children were able to bring cash to school and deposit it in their account. One day a week was 'banking day' at school, with parent helpers administering the scheme.
