= Postal savings system =

Banking services offered by a postal system

Postal savings systems a form of banking offered in conjunction with post office services, often in rural or isolated areas that do not have traditional banking. Postal saving systems can provide financial services to unbanked depositors that otherwise do not have access to banking.

== History ==
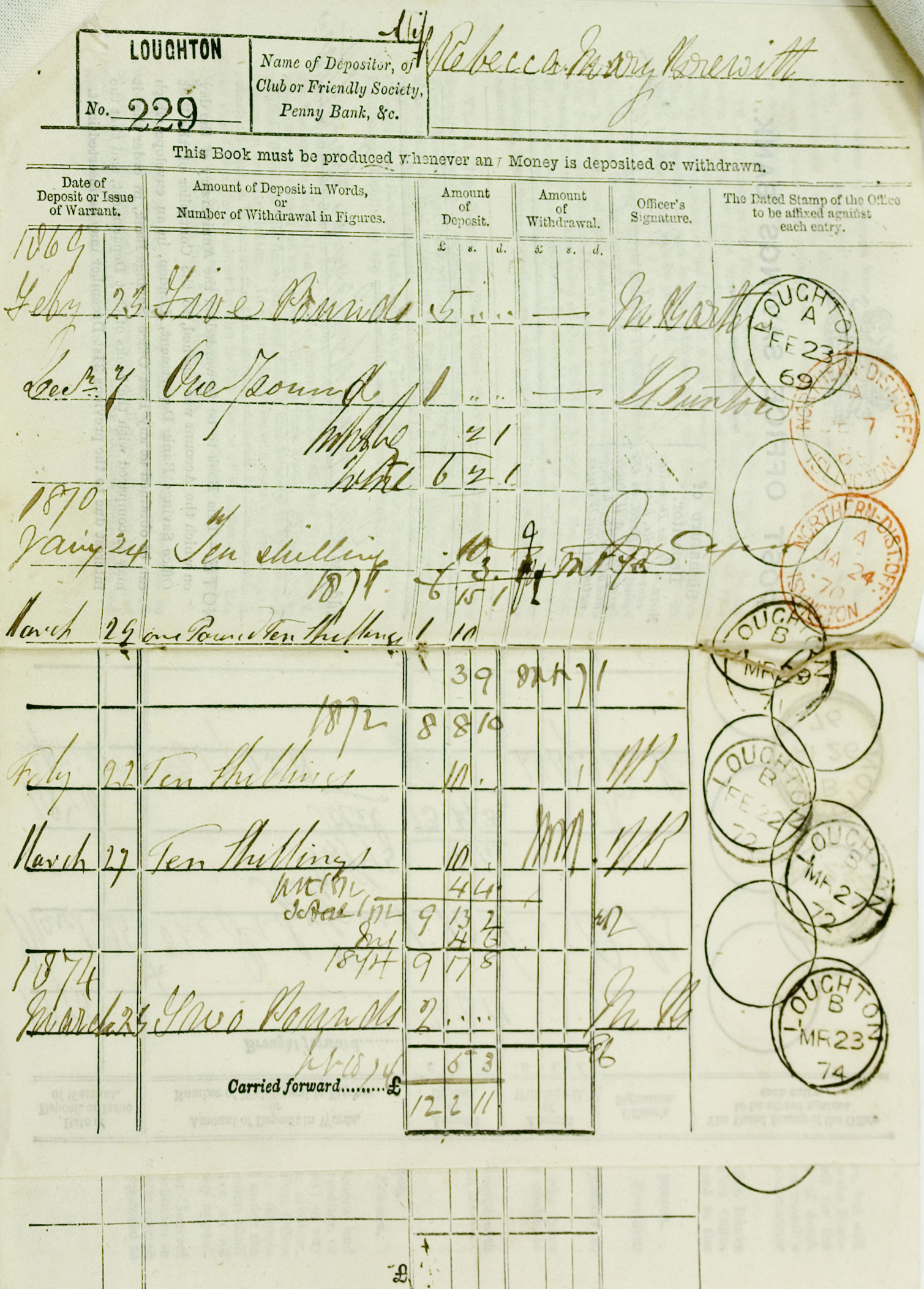
This 1869 deposit book would be carried by the customer, and is a typical record of a British Post Office Savings Bank savings account.

In 1861, Great Britain became the first nation to offer such an arrangement. It was supported by Sir Rowland Hill, who successfully advocated the penny post, and William Ewart Gladstone, then Chancellor of the Exchequer, who saw it as a cheap way to finance the public debt. At the time, banks were mainly in the cities and largely catered to wealthy customers. Rural citizens and the poor had no choice but to keep their funds at home or on their persons.

The original Post Office Savings Bank was limited to deposits of £30 per year with a maximum balance of £150. Interest was paid at the rate of 2.5 percent per annum on whole pounds in the account. Later, the limits were raised to a maximum of £500 per year in deposits with no limit on the total amount. Within five years of the system's establishment, there were over 600,000 accounts and £8.2 million on deposit. By 1927, there were twelve million accounts—one in four Britons—with £283 million (£15,371 million today) on deposit.

The British system first offered only savings accounts. In 1880, it also became a retail outlet for government bonds, and in 1916 introduced war savings certificates, which were renamed National Savings Certificates in 1920. In 1956, it launched a lottery bond, the Premium Bond, which became its most popular savings certificate. Post Office Savings Bank became National Savings Bank in 1969, later renamed National Savings and Investments (NS&I), an agency of HM Treasury. While continuing to offer National Savings services, the (then) General Post Office, created the National Giro in 1968 (privatized as Girobank and acquired by Alliance & Leicester in 1989).

Many other countries adopted such systems soon afterwards. Japan established a postal savings system in 1875 and the Dutch government started a systems in 1881 under the name Rijkspostspaarbank (national postal savings bank); this was followed by many other countries over the next 50 years. The later part of the 20th century saw a reversal where these systems were abolished or privatized.

== By country ==
=== Austria ===
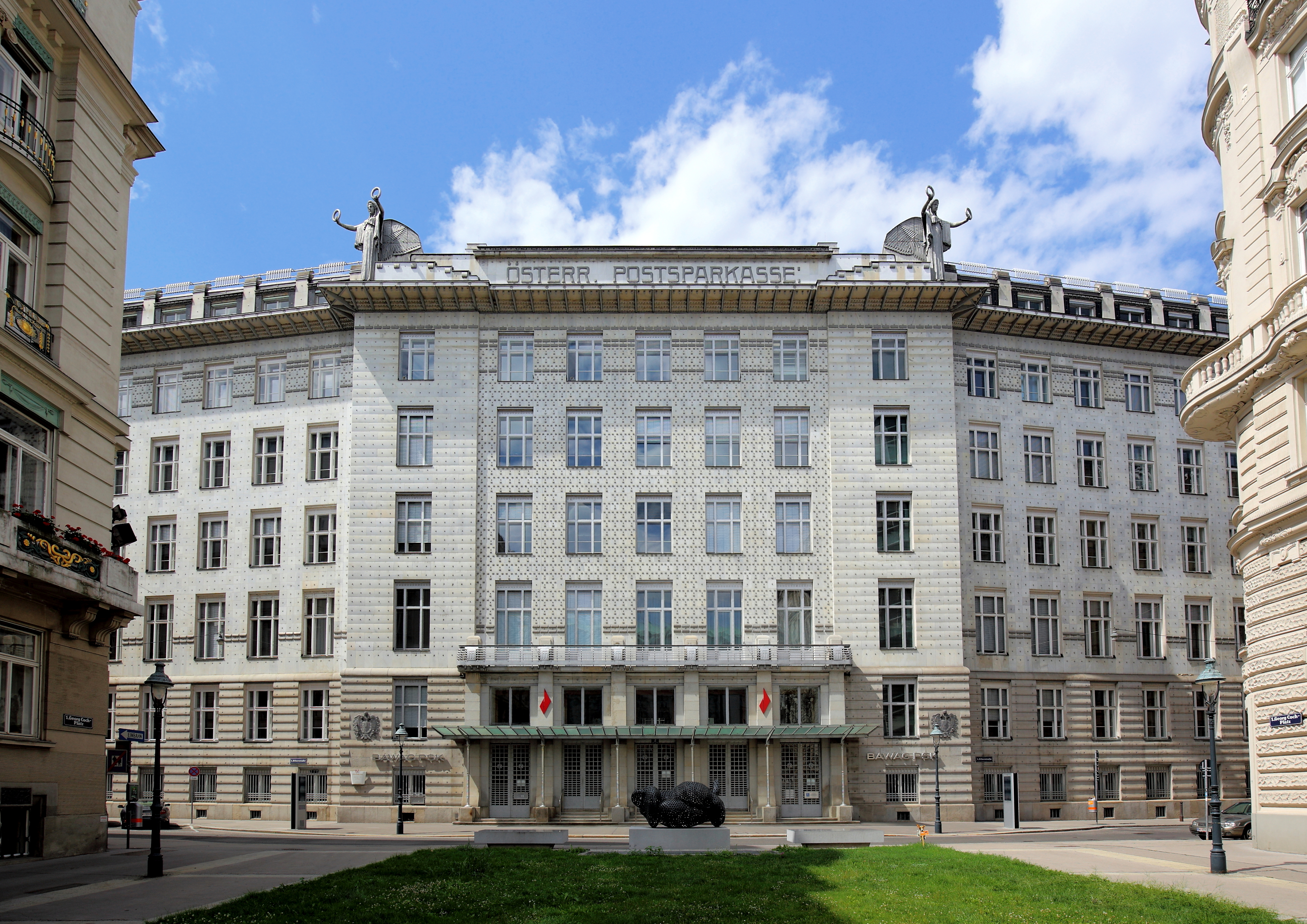
The Austrian Postal Savings Bank (P.S.K.) in Vienna

In Austria, the Österreichische Post used to own the Österreichische Postsparkasse (P.S.K.). This financial institute was bought and merged by the BAWAG in 2005. In April 2020, Österreichische Post launched a new postal bank, bank99.

=== Brazil ===
Brazil instituted a postal banking system in 2002, where the national postal service (ECT) formed a partnership with the largest private bank in the country (Bradesco) to provide financial services at post offices. The current partnership is with Bank of Brazil.

Today the bank is in a semi-defunct state since 2019, after a decree from the government shut down the branch.

=== Bulgaria ===
In Bulgaria, the postal banking system was a subsidiary of Bulgarian Posts until 1991, when Bulgarian Postbank was created. In the years that followed, Bulgarian Postbank was privatized and the relationship between post offices and bank offices became weaker. Postal banking services ceased to be available in post offices in 2011.

=== Canada ===
Canada Post offered banking services via its Post Office Savings Bank, created by the Post Office Act in April 1868, less than a year following the nation's confederation. A century later, the Post Office Savings Bank was shut down in 1968–69. Since at least the early 2010s, postal banking has been discussed and studied periodically, with postal unions backing the idea. In October 2022, Canada Post dipped its toe into the possibility of rolling out postal banking services by offering small personal loans between $1,000-$30,000 in partnership with TD Bank, but no chequing or savings accounts. Less than a month later, in November 2022, the loan program discontinued any new applications.

In 2024, Canada Post confirmed it has partnered with KOHO Financial to bring back postal banking by offering chequing and savings accounts; with a range of different accounts, including a basic no-fee account as well as accounts with fees. The date of public nationwide access to these banking services was planned for 2025.

Many rural communities, remote indigenous communities, and even some inner-city neighbourhoods, are lacking a local bank or credit union, many with either no reliable access to the internet or no affordable (or free public wifi) for internet banking. These financially underserved communities are left without the ability to have a locally accessible bank account, having a high risk of theft or misappropriation of funds if large amounts of cash are stored at home or else resort to paying costly fees using Canada Post's prepaid reloadable Visa card, inability to get a bank loan for a business, inability to build credit, great difficulty running a business, inability to deposit or cash cheques, or inability to cash cheques for more than a limited amount at retailers (if there's any retailers cashing cheques in their community) along with cheque cashing fees, or cash larger cheques at extremely high-fee payday lenders.

The number of bank branches in Canada have been steadily on the decline, from 6,350 in 2014 to 5,783 in 2020; as have credit union branches, from 3,603 in 2002 to 2,336 in 2022. Of the 2,620 small towns and rural communities with post offices in Canada, 1,178 (45%) did not have any bank branches; in over 700 indigenous communities in Canada, over 90% did not have any bank or credit union branches. As of 2018, there are more post offices (6,200) in Canada than bank branches. "Banking deserts" occur in cities also, in Ottawa's downtown Bank Street, there are more high-fees payday lenders than banks.

Despite the steady increase of online banking among Canadians, in 2022, the amount of cash in circulation was 25% higher than pre-pandemic levels. In 2020, 40% of transactions under $15 were conducted with cash. The ability to have a chequing account and withdrawal cash in-person from a local branch is vital for teens, low-income adults, adults trying to get out of debt, and vulnerable Canadians such as the disabled (those able to live without formal trusteeship), elderly and technology-illiterate, and those fleeing domestic abuse; as handling cash gives a more concrete understanding of where money is going than making purchases with a card, as well as less fees taking from their already small funds since purchases with cash have no transaction fees, overdraft fees, non-sufficient funds fees, or card loading fees.

=== China ===
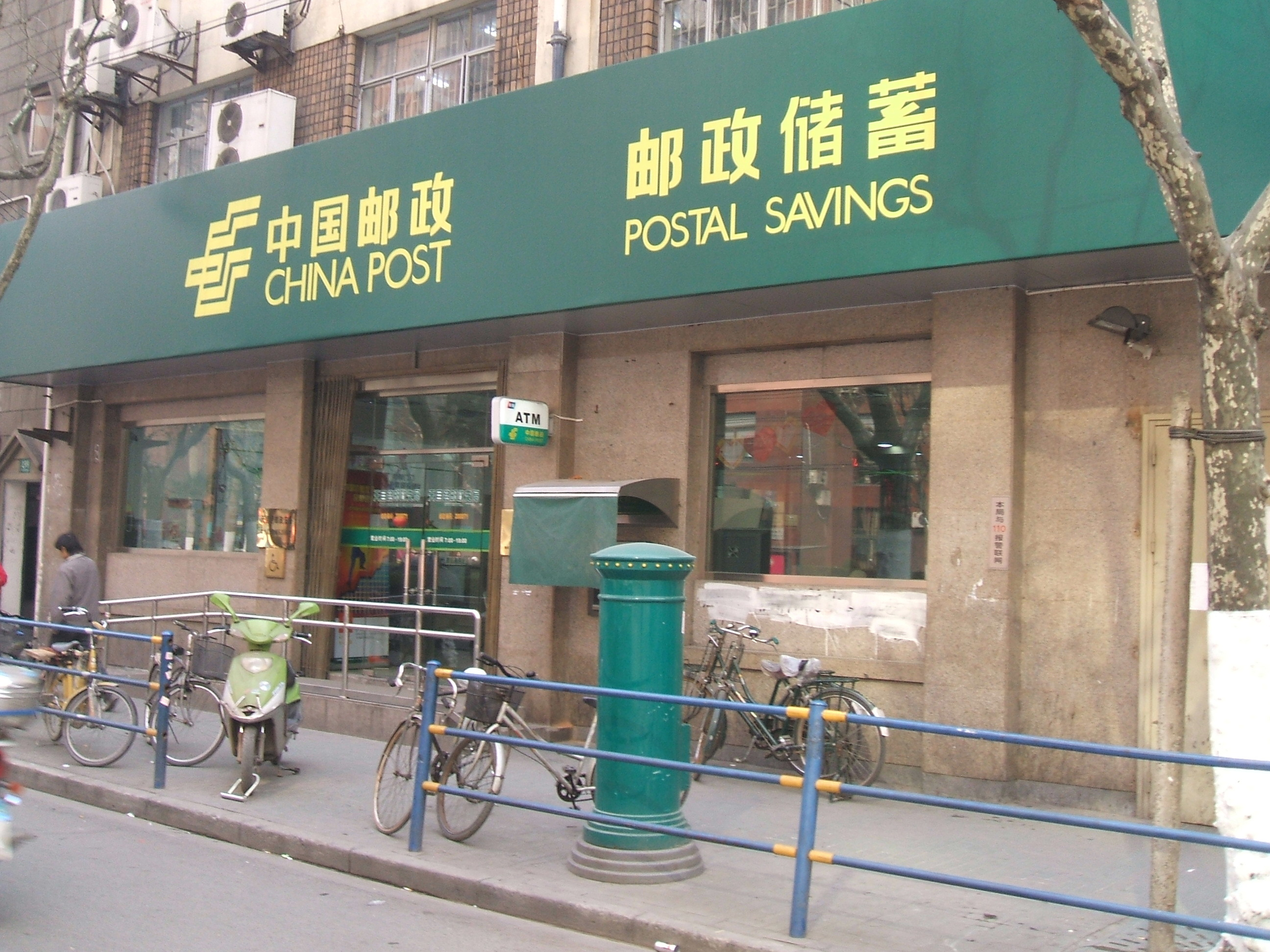
Post office in Shanghai offering postal savings services

In the People's Republic of China, the Postal Savings Bank of China (Chinese: 中国邮政储蓄银行) was split from China Post in 2007 and established as a state-owned limited company. It continues to provide banking services at post offices and, at the same time, some separated branches.

=== Finland ===
In Finland, Postisäästöpankki ("Post Savings Bank") was founded in 1887. In 1970 its name was shortened to Postipankki ("Post Bank"). In 1998 it was changed to a commercial bank named Leonia Bank. Later, it was merged with an insurance company to form Sampo Group, and the bank was renamed Sampo Bank. It had a few own offices, but also post offices performed its banking operations until 2000. In 2007, Sampo Bank was sold to the Danish Danske Bank.

=== France ===
France's postal service, La Poste, offers financial services through the affiliated bank known as La Banque postale.

=== Germany ===
Deutsche Postbank has a postal banking system. Deutsche Postbank was a subsidiary of Deutsche Post until 2008, when 30% of Deutsche Post's shares were sold to Deutsche Bank. Postal banking services are still available at all branches of Deutsche Post and Deutsche Postbank.

=== Greece ===
Greek Postal Savings Bank provided banking services from post offices until 2013 when it was replaced by New TT Hellenic Postbank a subsidiary of Eurobank Group.

=== Hungary ===
The postal savings bank of Hungary was established on 1 February 1886 by order of Lex IX of 1885. This act initially only authorized savings accounts, but was later expanded by Law XXXIV of 1889, which authorized "checks and clearing" starting on 1 January 1890. In 1919 the Postal Savings Bank notes were issued under the decree of the Revolutionary Governing Council of the Hungarian Soviet Republic by the Magyar Postatakarékpénztár (Hungarian Postal Savings Bank).

=== India ===
India Post has provided an avenue for managing savings to the people living in rural or the urban poor, underserved by the formal banking system, since 1882 when Post Office Savings Bank was established.

Over time, the scope of financial services provided by India Post grew to include other National Savings Schemes promoted by Government of India. In 2018, India Post Payments Bank (IPPB) was launched as a regulated bank to provide a full set of banking services, as specialised division of India Post. As of January 2022, the bank was serving around 50 million customers.

=== Indonesia ===
Postal savings in Indonesia began with the establishment of the Netherlands Indian Post Office Savings Bank (Dutch: Postspaarbank) in 1897. During the Japanese occupation of the Dutch East Indies, it was replaced by the Savings Office (Japanese: 貯金局, Hepburn: Chokin-kyoku; Nihon-shiki: Tyokin-kyoku) and savings were encouraged by the military administration to support the Greater East Asia War. The Savings Office became the Post Office Savings Bank again (Indonesian: Bank Tabungan Pos) after independence, before renamed into the current State Savings Bank, or Bank Tabungan Negara (BTN) in 1963. Between 1963 and 1968, it became the Fifth Unit of Bank Negara Indonesia during the single-bank system, made to support the guided democracy.

Currently, BTN offers a savings plan that allows its users to deposit in post offices.

=== Ireland ===
In Ireland, An Post provide a Post Office Savings Bank Deposit Account. It provides an interest rate of 0.15% which is added to the account at the end of the year. Customers are provided with a physical deposit book and can deposit and withdraw from the account using the deposit book at any Post Office Branch. This service is run on behalf of the National Treasury Management Agency with other "Ireland State Saving" schemes offered by the Irish Government, including Prize Bond.

An Post also provide saving stamps for children, from the 1980s stamps cost 50p/50c, each stamp was place in a card. There were 10 places on each side of the card, you could exchange the stamps for their value at any post office. Prior to this stamps cost 10p and allowed children to save just IR£1.

An Post also provide separate commercial banking services. Between 2006 and 2010 it ran Postbank, a joint venture with Fortis Bank Belgium. It now provides banking service under the brand An Post Money.

=== Israel ===
Israel's postal service Israel Postal Company offers utility payment, savings and checking accounts, as well as foreign currency exchange services from all post offices.

=== Italy ===
In Italy, the Postal savings system is run by Poste italiane, the Italian postal service company. Poste italiane run this service along with Cassa Depositi e Prestiti.

=== Japan ===
Japan Post Bank, part of the post office was the world's largest savings bank with 198 trillion yen (US$1.7 trillion) of deposits as of 2006, much from conservative, risk-averse citizens. The state-owned Japan Post Bank business unit of Japan Post was formed in 2007, as part of a ten-year privatization programme, intended to achieve fully private ownership of the postal system by 2017.

=== Kazakhstan ===
In Kazakhstan, national postal operator, Kazpost, has a banking license and offers banking services in all its branches across the country.

=== Kenya ===
Kenya Post Office Savings Bank (KPOSB/Postbank)

=== Netherlands ===
In 1881 the Dutch government founded the Rijkspostspaarbank (National Postal Savings Bank). In 1986 it was privatised, together with the Postgiro service, as the Postbank N.V. Postbank merged with a commercial bank that would eventually become ING Bank.

=== New Zealand ===
Post Office Savings Bank was established in 1867 by the New Zealand government to give New Zealand investors a place to deposit their savings. This included the provision of children's savings accounts known as Post Office Squirrel savings account. The Post Office Savings bank was split into PostBank in 1987 and was acquired by ANZ Bank New Zealand two years later ending the bank.

In 2002 the New Zealand government created a new state owned post bank called Kiwibank as part of the New Zealand Post to again establish a postal savings system.

=== Norway ===
Postbanken was founded in 1948 after major political battle as Norges Postsparebank, however the maximum amount allowed to be saved per person was set to NOK 10,000. In 1948 the bank had services provided at 3,600 post offices and post outlets. It was sold in 1999 and became part of the commercial bank DNB ASA.

=== Philippines ===
The Philippine Postal Savings Bank (PPSB), also known as PostalBank, is the state-owned postal savings system in the Philippines. It is the smallest of the Philippines' three state-owned banks and is governed separately from PhilPost. In late 2017, state bank Land Bank of the Philippines acquired PPSB at zero value and made it as a subsidiary. It is now known as Overseas Filipino Bank.

=== Portugal ===
In Portugal, the CTT own 100% of the Banco CTT, which has been operating since 2015 throughout Portugal.

=== Singapore ===
In Singapore, POSB Bank was established in 1877 as the Post Office Savings Bank. Today, it now operates as part of DBS Bank, after its acquisition on 16 November 1998.

=== South Africa ===
Postbank (South Africa), operated by the South African Post Office (SAPO). Offers transactional, savings, investments, insurance & pension banking services.

=== South Korea ===
Korea Post, operated by South Korean government, has its postal banking and postal insurance business since 1982. Banking counter and ATM is available in all post office, excluding postal agencies and delivery centers. Korea Post ATM is connected with all national and regional banks via KFTC. Banking counter is also opened for Korea Development Bank, Industrial Bank, Citibank Korea, and Jeonbuk Bank customers.

=== Sri Lanka ===
In Sri Lanka, National Savings Bank and Sri Lanka Post provide banking services through post offices.

=== Taiwan ===
In Taiwan, the Chunghwa Post provides savings accounts and Visa debit card services in the Free Area of the Republic of China.

=== Thailand ===
Between 1 April 1929 and 31 March 1947, the Post and Telegraph Department of the Ministry of Commerce and Communications of Siam (before becoming Ministry of Economic Affairs in 1932 before being split to Ministry of Economic Affairs and Ministry of Communications in 1942) has run Saving Office before becoming Government Savings Bank (GSB)

=== United Kingdom ===
The Post Office Ltd offers savings accounts based on its brand, and is operated by the Bank of Ireland, a commercial bank, and Family Investments, a friendly society.

The Post Office branded services are similar to some of National Savings and Investments' services, and include instant savings, Individual Savings Accounts, seasonal savings and savings bonds.

Post Office Ltd also provided a Post Office card account that accepted only direct deposits of certain state pension and welfare payments, permitting cash withdrawals over the counter. This last account was offered in partnership with the Department for Work and Pensions until 2010, through investment banking and asset management company JP Morgan and discontinued in 2022.

=== United States ===
In the United States, the United States Postal Savings System was established in 1911 under the Act of June 25, 1910 (36 Stat. 814). It was discontinued by the Act of March 28, 1966 H.R. 8030 (89th Cong.) (80 Stat. 92) as the number of regular depositors had declined and the plan was not financially sustainable.

Fifty years later, the platform for the 2016 presidential campaign of Vermont senator Bernie Sanders included plans for postal banking. In 2018, Massachusetts Sen. Elizabeth Warren and New York Sen. Kirsten Gillibrand supported such a program. In April 2018, Gillibrand introduced S.2755 - Postal Banking Act partly in response to the Trump administration's suspension of payday lending regulation imposed during the Obama administration. In 2020, after Joe Biden defeated Senator Sanders in the 2020 Democratic presidential primaries, the Biden-Sanders "Unity Task Force” policy recommendations for a Biden administration included postal banking. In September 2020, Gillibrand and Sanders announced a newer Postal Banking Act, intended to strengthen the US Post Office’s finances and offer banking services to inner-city residents.

=== Vietnam ===
Lien Viet Post Joint Stock Commercial Bank or LienVietPostBank (LPB), formerly known as LienVietBank, is a Vietnamese retail bank that provides banking products and services through its own transaction points across 42 cities and provinces and 1,031 postal transaction offices nationwide. LBP is considered to be in the top 10 biggest banks in terms of assets and equity [2] and ranked 36th in VNR500 – Top 500 largest private companies in Vietnam in 2013. The Bank is striving to become the bank for everyone in Vietnam by focusing on banking products for households and small and medium enterprises especially in the agriculture sector, and expanding its activities to rural and remote areas via the post.

== See also ==
- History of banking
- Banking agent
