= New Zealand Post Office =

Former New Zealand government department

- Type: Government department
- Founded: 1881
- Defunct: 1 April 1987
- Fate: Split-up
- Successor: New Zealand Post Limited; Telecom Corporation of New Zealand Limited; Post Office Bank Limited
- Headquarters: Wellington, New Zealand
- Products: Telecommunications; Postal services; Retail banking

The New Zealand Post Office (NZPO) was a government department of New Zealand until 1987. It was previously (from 1881 to 1959) named the New Zealand Post and Telegraph Department (NZ P&T).

As a government department, the New Zealand Post Office had as its political head the Postmaster General, who was a member of Cabinet, and, when it was a separate department, the Minister of Telegraphs.

The NZPO was similar to the British Post Office or GPO, and so was similar to European PTT or postal, telegraph and telephone services, which were government monopolies.

== History ==
=== 19th century ===
Official postal services started in New Zealand after Captain William Hobson arrived in the Bay of Islands and took up his role as Lieutenant-Governor. Hobson appointed William Clayton Hayes as Clerk to the Bench of Magistrates and Postmaster and the first official post office was opened at Kororareka, now called Russell. Hayes holds the distinction of being New Zealand's first civil servant to be dismissed as he neglected his duty and was continually inebriated. By 1845 post offices had also been opened at Rawene, Auckland, New Plymouth, Whanganui, Wellington, Nelson and Akaroa.

The establishment of settlements across the North and South Islands meant the need for an internal postal service was becoming more and more important, but New Zealand's geography, ongoing wars between Māori and Europeans and intertribal fighting hindered communication. At the time, shipping mail coast-to-coast, although inefficient, was the most reliable means of transporting mail around the country. A monthly shipping service to Sydney, where mail was exchanged with outbound and inbound London ships, saw the first regular overseas mail service established.

The Local Posts Act of 1856 gave provincial councils the authority to create their own mail services and local post offices, while the Government continued to maintain the overland trunk postal routes and the head post office in each province. The Post Office Act of 1858 repealed the Local Posts Act, establishing the Post Office Department as a government department, reporting to the Postmaster General, and providing for its administration. By 1880 there were 856 post offices.

The Post Office Department was merged with the Electric Telegraph Department in 1881 to create the New Zealand Post and Telegraph Department.

=== 20th century ===
By the beginning of the 20th century, the New Zealand Post Office had over 1,700 branches and continued to grow rapidly throughout the century. As well as postal services it ran a savings bank and was responsible for telephone services. The rapid increase in private telephones in people's homes, and the introduction of internal and international airmail services in the 1930s, contributed to its growth.

The New Zealand Post and Telegraph Department was renamed the New Zealand Post Office in 1959. As well as traditional communication services, the Post Office provided community services including registering births, marriages, deaths and cars, accepting television and fishing licence fees, enrolling people to vote, and collecting pensions. Post Offices also provided daily weather and temperature checks for the Meteorological Office, and postmasters were able to perform marriage ceremonies. Throughout the 20th century, the Post Office was New Zealand's biggest employer.

In the 1960s and 70s steps were taken towards better managing the ever-increasing volumes of national and international mail: the installation of New Zealand's first mechanical mail sorting machine in the Auckland parcel depot, and the introduction of address postal codes to simplify bulk mail sorting. However, increasingly the tension between political and commercial pressures meant the business was not operating efficiently.

By the 1980s, the variety of roles, the sometimes-conflicting needs of three different businesses, and political considerations were major constraints on the Post Office. It was increasingly unable to meet growing consumer demands and the postal side alone was losing over $20 million a year, with expectations that this would balloon in the future.

In 1985, Jonathan Hunt, Postmaster General, ordered a review of the organisational and management structure of the Post Office. The subsequent Mason-Morris report of 1986 called for sweeping changes, separating the three core businesses to operate as independent State-owned corporations.

=== Abolition ===
On 1 April 1987, the department was abolished under the Postal Services Act 1987, and three state-owned enterprises (SOEs) were formed, responsible to the Minister of State Owned Enterprises, initially from 14 August 1989 Stan Rodger.

- New Zealand Post Limited
- Post Office Bank Limited
- Telecom Corporation of New Zealand Limited
  - Telecom was subsequently split into (as a condition of participating in Ultra-Fast Broadband):

Chorus Limited (a regulated monopoly (wholesale only) provider of fibre broadband service, and:
Spark New Zealand (a retailer and mobile phone service provider. )

Of these, due to privatisation, only New Zealand Post remains as an SOE. Telecom was sold to two United States Baby Bells, and PostBank was sold to the Pacific banking conglomerate Australia and New Zealand Banking Group (ANZ). The Postbank brand was phased out by the late-1990s. Telecom was floated on the New Zealand Stock Exchange in the early 1990s, per the conditions of its privatisation, and was rebranded in August 2014 as Spark.

In 2001, Kiwibank, a new government-owned bank, was established as a subsidiary of NZ Post.
