= TT Hellenic Postbank =

Commercial bank

TT Hellenic Postbank SA
- Native name: Ταχυδρομικό Ταμιευτήριο Ελλάδος Ανώνυμη Τραπεζική Εταιρία
- Industry: Financial services
- Founded: (December 1900)
- Defunct: 2013
- Successor: New TT Hellenic Postbank
- Headquarters: Athens, Greece
- Number of locations: 147 branches (2010)
- Area served: Greece
- Products: Retail banking
- Website: ttbank.gr

TT Hellenic Postbank (formerly the Greek Postal Savings Bank, Greek: Ταχυδρομικό Ταμιευτήριο Tachidromiko Tamieftirio) was a commercial bank based in Athens, in Greece. The bank's license was withdrawn in January 2013 and it was put into liquidation.

== See also ==
- Postal savings system
- List of banks in Greece
