= Austrian Postal Savings Bank =

Art Nouveau building by Otto Wagner

Coordinates: 48°12′36″N 16°22′49″E

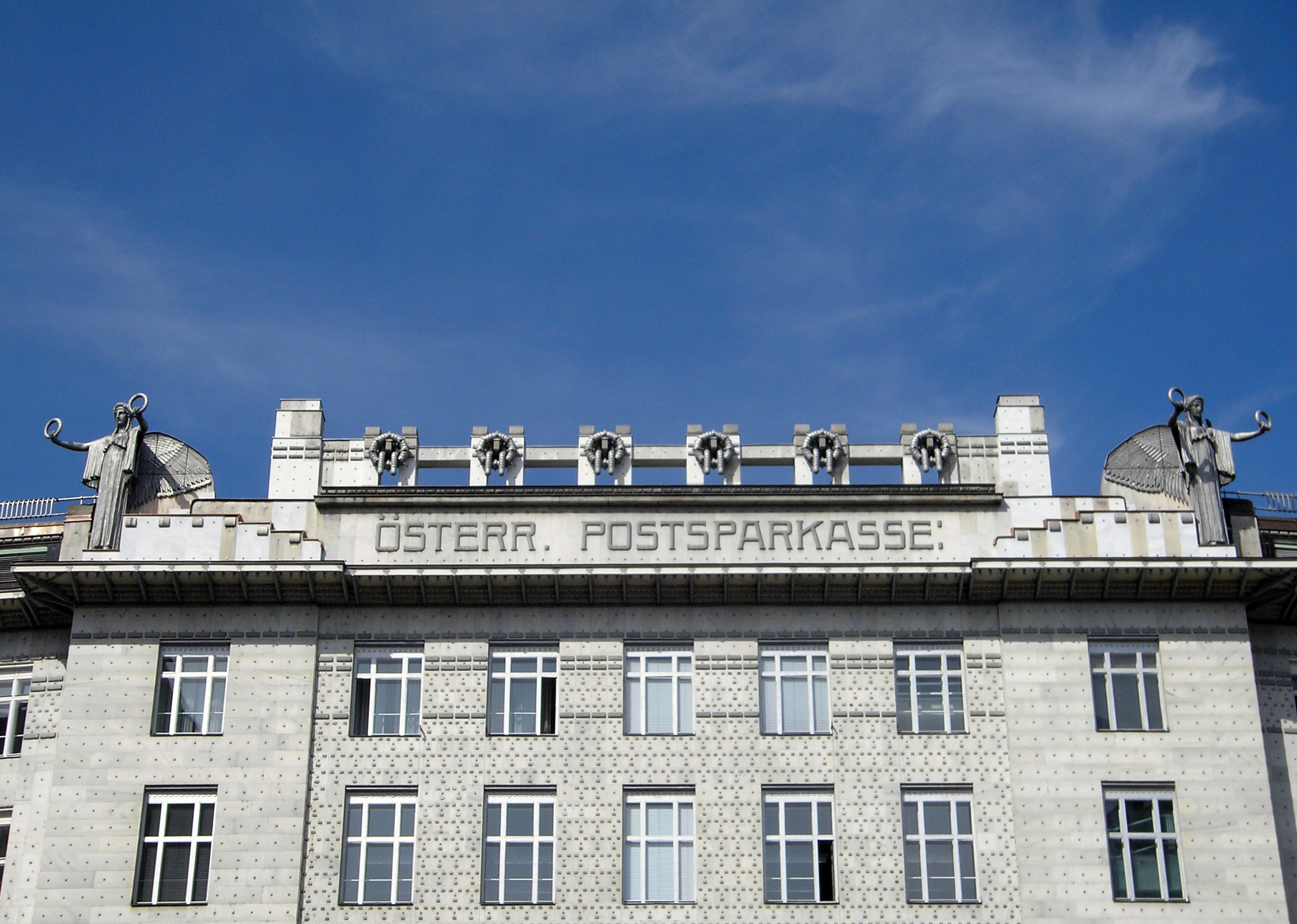
Austrian Postal Savings Bank

The Austrian Postal Savings Bank building (German: Österreichische Postsparkasse, pronounced [ˌøːstəʁaɪçɪʃə ˈpɔstʃpaːɐˌkasə]) is a famous building in Vienna, designed and built by the architect Otto Wagner. The building is regarded as an important work of the Vienna Secession movement, a branch of Art Nouveau.

It was constructed between 1904 and 1906 using then completely new reinforced concrete, and was opened on 17 December 1906. An extension was added between 1910 and 1912.

The building houses the headquarters of the BAWAG P.S.K. bank, formerly the Österreichische Postsparkasse (P.S.K.) bank before its merger with BAWAG in 2005. It is located at Georg-Coch-Platz 2, in the first district Innere Stadt, next to the Ringstrasse boulevard.

== Exterior ==
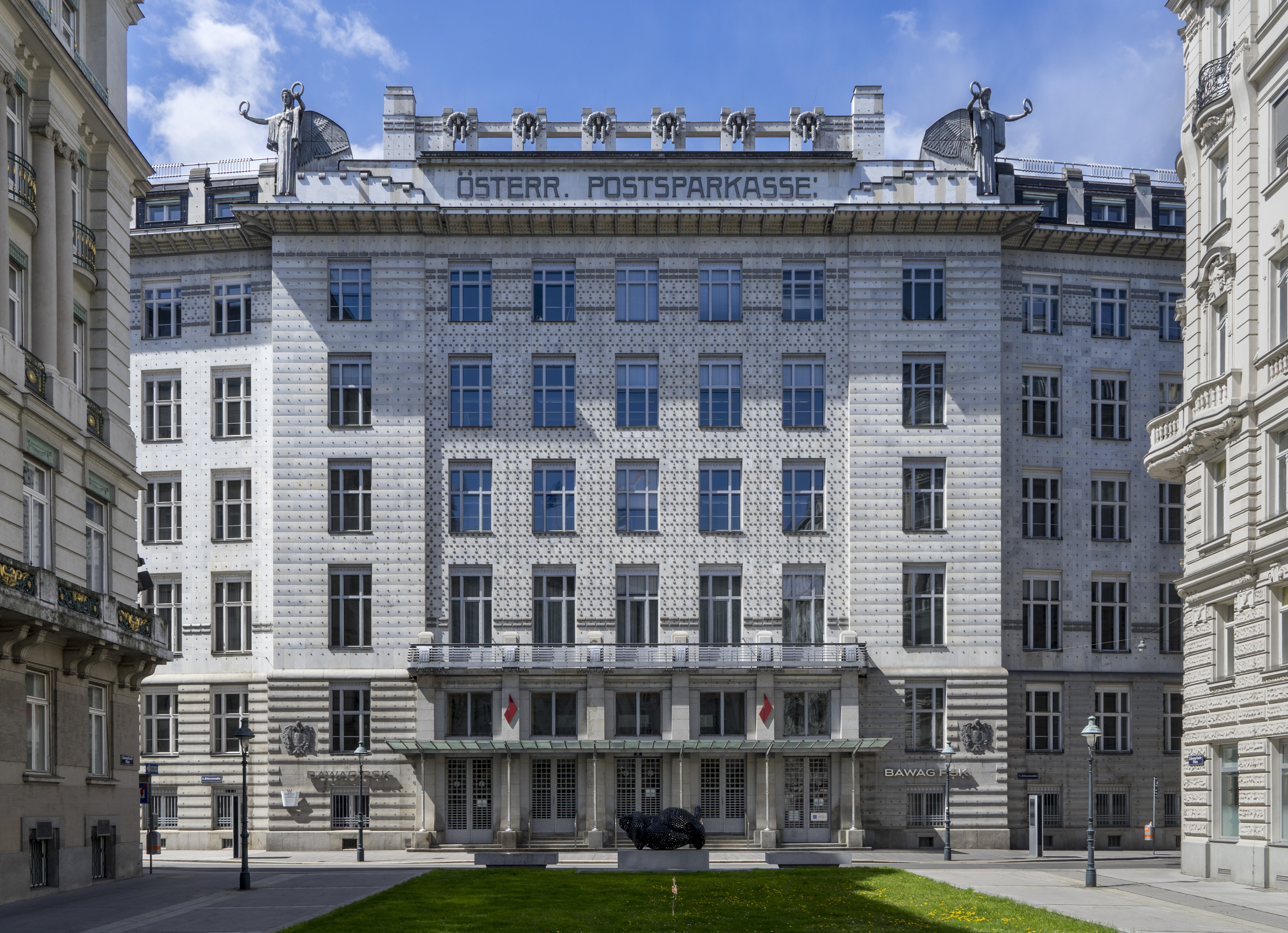
Main facade of the Österreichische Postsparkasse (P.S.K.) building in Vienna

Up to eight stories high, the building occupies an entire city block. The façade is covered with square marble slabs and aluminium applications reminiscent of a money storage. Granite slabs are attached to the lower and upper levels. The rivets with which the marble cladding seems to be fixed to the wall are purely ornamental and articulate the facade. For a long time, it was believed that approximately 10 cm thick plates are kept in place solely by plaster, implying the iron bolts had no supporting function and were merely decorative "dummy nails." However, material analysis has revealed that these bolts were, in fact, "the means by which the thin marble slabs were secured over a bed of mortar".

The use of marble makes the maintenance and cleaning of the façade very easy and inexpensive, important functional element in Wagner's design. Wagner greatly valued the aluminium, material perfected by Austrian chemist Carl Josef Bayer for industrial production. He used the material not only for the rivets, but also for other decorative elements on the outside and inside of the building, such as the portico columns and the central heating fans. The 4.3 meters high sculptures, for the first time made of cast aluminium and located on the attica of the building are work of Wagner long time collaborator Othmar Schimkowitz. The glass windows are partly a work of Leopold Forstner.

== Interior ==
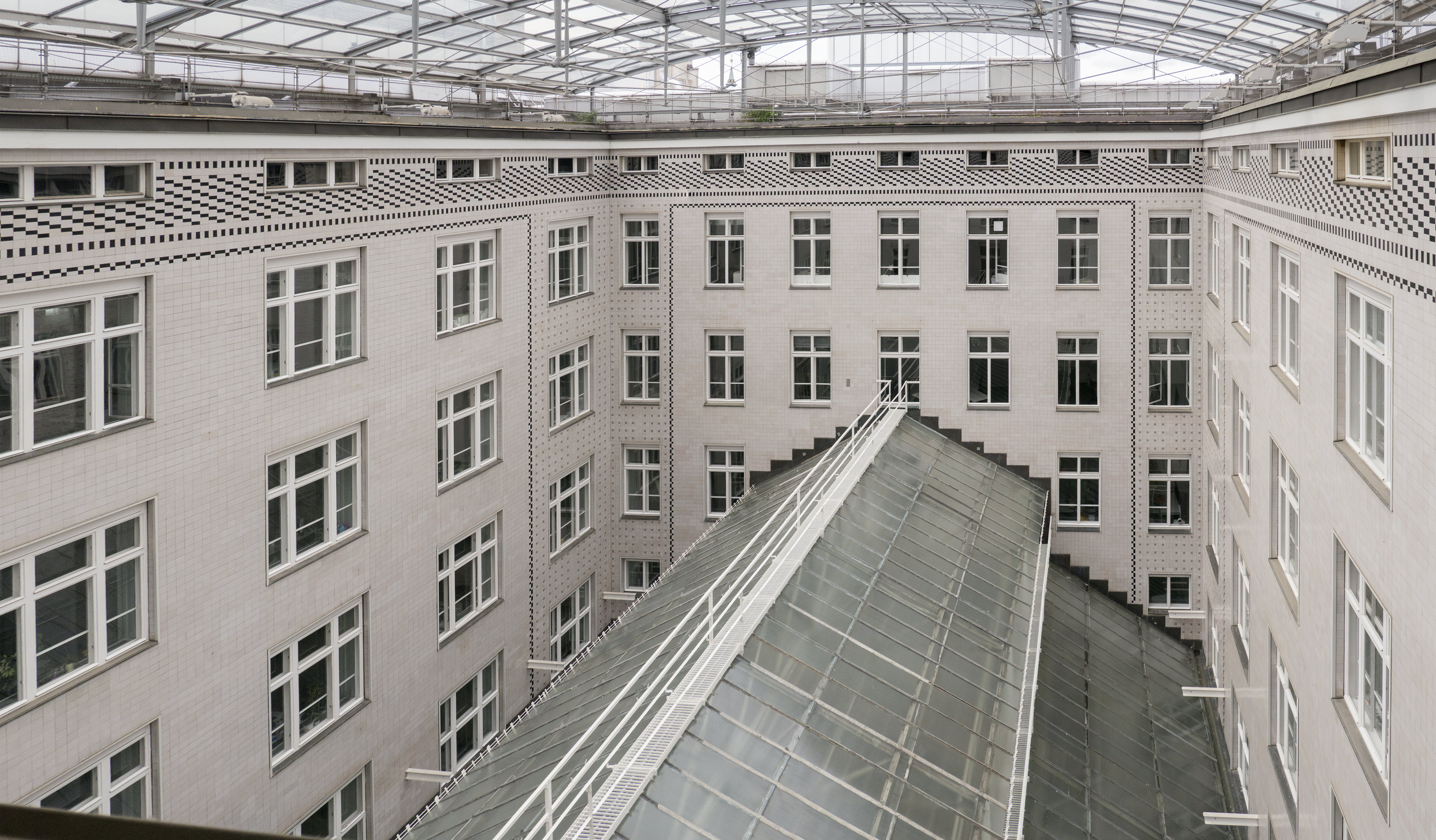
View of atrium

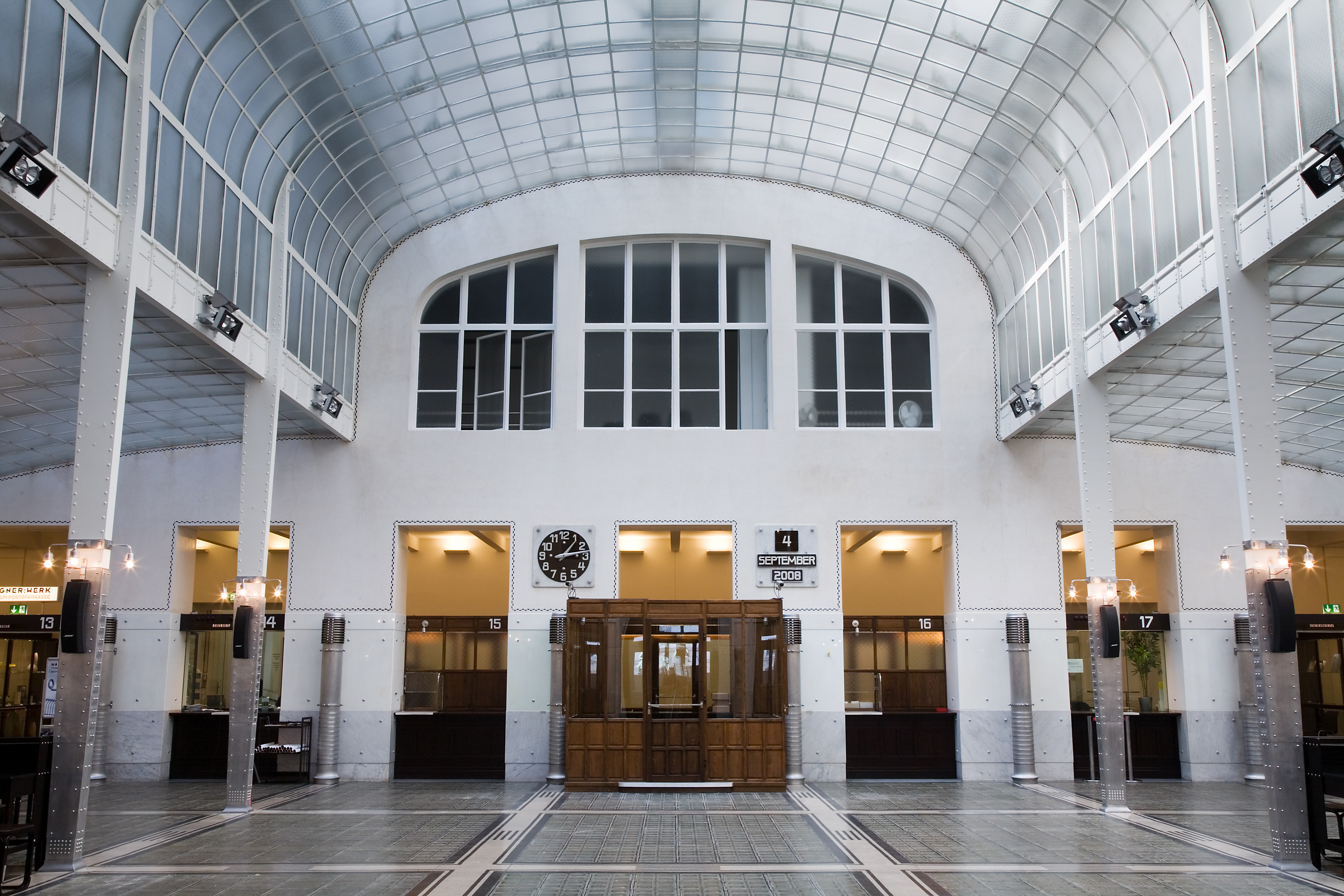
Main hall in the Österreichische Postsparkasse building in Vienna

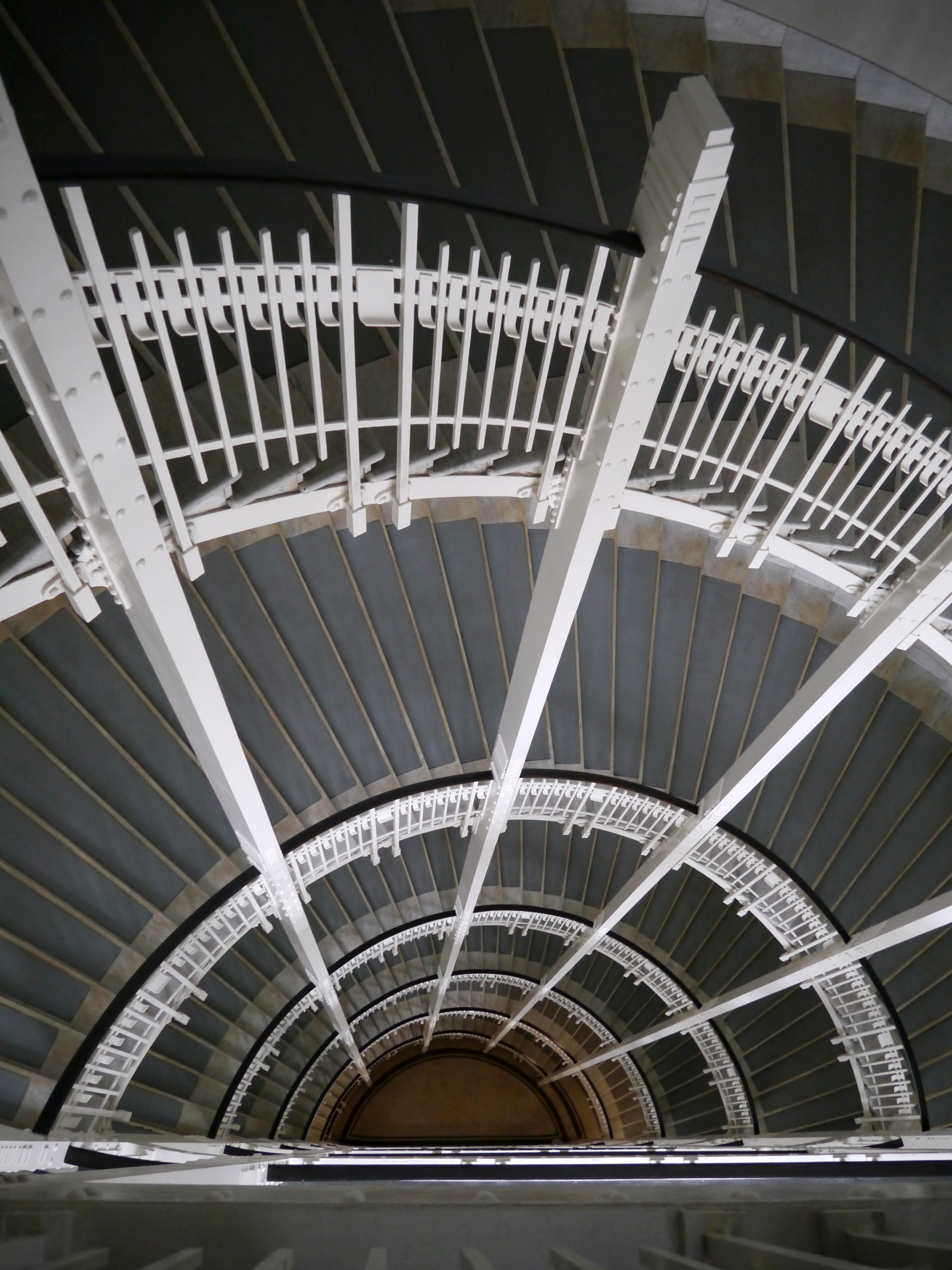
Stairwell

Through the main entrance at Georg-Coch-Platz the visitor ascends a flight of stairs to the grand Kassenhalle, where customer services are located. The main hall is thus effectively on the first floor. The hall is designed like an atrium, with a large glass skylight allowing natural light to enter the heart of the building at all times. Natural light is not used only for stylistic reasons, but also to reduce the cost of electric lighting. Even the floor of the main hall is constructed of glass tiles, allowing natural light to reach further down to the floor below, where the Post Office boxes and mail sorting rooms are located. Wagner kept decoration in the main hall minimal, using only glass and polished steel as materials. The decorative effect is created by the simple but elegant use of the material itself. The frosted glass skylight is pierced by steel columns, their slim design making them as unobstructive to the falling light as possible. The hall is one of Otto Wagner's famous works, and one of the finest examples of the Viennese Secession.

The building's office space is divided according to the axis of the outside windows, again making use of natural light as much as possible. The interior walls are non-load-bearing, and can therefore be re-arranged according to need, a feature that has become standard in modern office buildings.

== Current state ==
Spared any damage during World War II, the building is still in its original state and since 2005 includes a museum devoted to its creator, Otto Wagner.

== Literature ==
- Otto Wagner. Die österreichische Postsparkasse. Falter Verlag, Wien. 1996. ISBN 3-85439-180-3
- Carl E. Schorske. Fin-de-Siècle Vienna: Politics and Culture. Vintage, London. 1980. ISBN 0-394-74478-0
- Willis, H. Parker (1897). "The Austrian Postal Savings-Bank". Journal of Political Economy. 5 (4): 505–506.
